= Red Spears' uprising in Shandong =

Red Spears' uprising in Shandong may refer to several rebellions by the Red Spear Society throughout the history of the Republic of China (1912–1949). Some of the most notable ones were:

- Red Spears rebelled at the Shandong-Hebei-Henan border in 1924, and continued to resist both warlord forces as well as the Nationalist government in this region until the 1930s
- A major rebellion against Zhang Zongchang in western Shandong in 1926
- The Red Spears' uprising in Shandong (1928–1929) against Liu Zhennian, the ruler of eastern Shandong at the time

== Bibliography ==
- Bianco, Lucien (2015). Peasants without the Party: Grassroots Movements in Twentieth Century China. Abingdon-on-Thames, New York City: Routledge. ISBN 978-1563248405.
- Thaxton, Ralph A. (1997). Salt of the Earth: The Political Origins of Peasant Protest and Communist Revolution in China. Oakland, California: University of California Press. ISBN 978-0520203181.
