= Red Spear Society =

Rural self-defense movement during the Warlord Era

- Traditional Chinese: 紅槍會
- Simplified Chinese: 红枪会
Transcriptions
Standard Mandarin
- Hanyu Pinyin: Hóngqiānghuì
- Wade–Giles: Hung^{2}-ch`iang^{1}-hui^{4}
- IPA: [xʊ̌ŋ.tɕʰjáŋ.xwêɪ]
Yue: Cantonese
- Yale Romanization: Hùhng-cheūng-wuí
- Jyutping: Hung4 coeng1 wui2
- IPA: [hʊŋ˩ tsʰœŋ˥ wuj˧˥]

The Red Spear Society began as a rural self-defense movement in Henan, Hebei and Shandong in northern China during the Warlord Era in the 1920s. These were local groups of small-holders and tenant farmers organized to defend villages against roaming bandits, warlords, tax collectors or later Chinese communists or Japanese. For most of the Republic of China period in China the Red Spear Society posed a challenge to government control in North China. They were similar in nature to the Big Swords Society.

Because of a large immigration to Northeast China to escape the chaos in North China they were also active in Manchuria forming part of the Anti-Japanese volunteer armies resisting the Japanese establishment of Manchukuo in 1932.

In Manchuria members of the brotherhood were described as "primitive-minded people" who placed their faith in rustic magics and belief in the righteous character's Heavenly reward. Red Spear bodies formed in the countryside around Harbin were in many cases led by Buddhist monks as they went into battle, they and their weapons decorated with magic inscriptions similar to the earlier Boxer rebels. The color red was used as it was believed to offer them protection against disaster.

Some Society members were won over and absorbed by the Chinese Red Army during the Second Sino-Japanese War or by the People's Liberation Army in the Chinese Civil War. In 1953, the Chinese Communist Party government launched a suppression campaign against Hui-Dao-Men ("Societies-Ways-Brotherhoods"), eradicating them from mainland China. Some of their offshoots have reappeared, reintroduced by Chinese adherents who live overseas.

Red Spear Society, sometimes also called the Red Learning Society, was a rural self-defense organization in the villages of North China during the Mainland period of the Republic of China. It took its name from the red-tasseled spears that its members used as weapons. The Red Spear Society was a successor to the Boxer Movement and the White Lotus Society. It arose in the early years of the Republic when landlords and villagers organized to resist bandits, soldiers, and warlords, and it spread throughout the villages of North China. At its height in the mid-1920s its membership reached as many as three million.

The Red Spear Society took as its purpose “protecting one’s family and home, and mutual aid in watching over one another.” It defended the interests of rural landlords and peasants and had no intention of overthrowing the government. Its main targets were the plundering of bandits and the heavy taxation and arbitrary levies of soldiers and warlords. It once joined forces to inflict heavy defeats on the Henan warlords Yue Weijun and Wu Peifu as well as the Fengtian Army, and it resisted the tax- and grain-collection policies of the Nationalist Government. In the 1930s it temporarily disappeared after being reorganized into official militias, but it revived after the outbreak of the Second Sino-Japanese War and assisted regular troops and guerrilla forces in resisting the invasion of the Japanese army.

Members of the Red Spear Society claimed to possess the magical power of being invulnerable to swords and spears. On the battlefield they fought with great courage. Members had to strictly obey the guidance of their teachers and senior disciples, kowtow and swear oaths, and undergo rigorous training that included enduring bricks, knives, and guns. They received talismans and spells together with holy water from their teachers, swallowed the talismans and recited the spells, and learned the arts of spirit possession and descent of the gods. During the first three months after joining they observed a vegetarian diet and abstained from sexual activity; afterward they were believed to possess the art of being invulnerable to weapons.

The Red Spear Society was generally initiated by landlords or local gentry, who invited masters to teach disciples. Villagers each paid initiation fees and contributed protection dues. The society’s hall was set up in the village temple or ancestral hall, where incense was burned and images of deities and talismans were hung. The Chinese Communist Party sought to win over the Red Spear Society, hoping to transform it into peasant associations and absorb it as a revolutionary force, but these reorganization efforts were not successful.

== Origins ==
The Red Spear Society was a successor to the Boxer Society.戴玄之 (1973). 《紅槍會》 (in Traditional Chinese). 台北: 食貨出版有限公司. ISBN 9786688760092. Like the Boxers, it was deeply influenced by popular religion; members believed that by performing certain rituals, swallowing talismans, and reciting spells they would become invulnerable to swords and spears. After the Boxers were suppressed and disintegrated in 1900, the survivors laid down their weapons and returned to their home villages. Many Boxer members in western Shandong went underground. In the early years of the Republic, the growing severity of banditry once again called forth their long-renowned arts of self-defense, and they became the teachers of the newly rising Red Spear Society. After the death of Yuan Shikai in 1916, the country fragmented. In the border region of Hebei, Henan, and Shandong, bandits rose up in swarms while the authorities were helpless, and the people suffered greatly. Former Boxer members who had lain low for sixteen years now revived like embers rekindled. They rose again, still with the purpose of “protecting family and home, defending against bandits, and mutual aid in watching over one another,” but abandoned the name of the Boxers and instead called themselves the “Red Spear Society.” Some scholars also point out that the Red Spear Society originated from the White Lotus Society, inheriting the self-defense tradition of rural militias and being related to the White Lotus sects of the Qing dynasty that claimed invulnerability to weapons—the Golden Bell Cover and Iron Shirt—as well as to the “Hard Heads” that appeared in western Henan in 1917–1918. The name “Red Spear” refers to the weapon most commonly used by the group: a wooden-shafted spear decorated with a red tassel.{ Because villagers lacked modern weapons, each person prepared a spear for defense against bandits. The spearhead was made of steel, about one chi long, fitted onto a shaft five or six chi in length; red hemp, dyed red horsehair, or thick red silk thread was tied below the head of the shaft, and it was called a red spear.{

It is impossible to determine exactly when the Red Spear Society first appeared. Some believe it first emerged in 1911 in response to the bandit Bai Lang; another view is that it arose in 1915–1916 in response to the bandit Lao Yangren. Dai Xuanzhi holds that in 1916 the Red Spear Society first arose in the birthplace of the Boxers—western Shandong around Caozhou and Dongchang—and then spread to Henan, southern Hebei, northern Jiangsu, and northern Anhui. Elizabeth J. Perry notes that the name “Red Spear Society” appeared around 1920, while 三谷孝 believes it appeared around 1921. The Red Flag Society, active in southern Shandong from 1919 to 1921, was the earliest organization of the Red Spear Society type in the Republican period; it developed in response to the threat of the local Sun family bandit gang. From 1920 onward, as the Beiyang warlords fought among themselves and bandits and disbanded soldiers filled the land, villagers formed Red Spear Societies everywhere for self-protection, most of them using the red spear as their only weapon. At that time on the North China Plain, bandits and armies ran rampant without restraint. By 1925 the number of bandits in Henan province alone exceeded 100,000, while the government lacked the capacity for control. In places beyond the reach of government power where bandits were rampant, people had no choice but to rely on popular self-defense groups and to strengthen defensive measures such as the crop-watching associations. The people, suffering from their inability to resist the enemy, were receptive to the heterodox doctrine of the Red Spear Society that by swallowing talismans and reciting spells one could become invulnerable to weapons. Villages everywhere began learning the red-spear arts, and Red Spear Societies were widely formed to defend their localities. Large and small spear societies spread throughout the villages of North China. The more severe the threat of plunder in a region, the more active the Red Spear Society became. For example, in 1923 villages in the Xuzhou area began organizing Red Spear Societies to compensate for the incompetence of the regular militias. An American consul in North China once commented: “On the whole it appears to be a healthy reaction of the rural population suffering from the depredations of bandits and government troops.”{

== Purpose ==
The purpose of the Red Spear Society was “protecting one’s family and home, and mutual aid in watching over one another.” It was a rural self-defense movement that resisted bandits, warlords, and government tax collectors. Its original aim was solely to defend against bandits. Later, because the armies not only failed to suppress bandits but were themselves undisciplined and harassed the people no differently from bandits, villagers turned their hatred toward the soldiers. Relations between the Red Spear Society and government troops became hostile; they attacked armies, resisted taxes and grain levies, and occasionally punished corrupt officials. After the Mukden Incident, the Red Spear Society in the Northeast took as its purpose “protecting the country, defending the people, and safeguarding the hometown” and “expelling the Japanese invaders and restoring China.” In the 1920s, demands for land taxes and miscellaneous levies increased without end, and rural wealthy households resisted these new extortions. The Red Spear Society challenged the authority of local governments in North China, detested government officials and their tax policies, and regarded them as a threat to rural property owners; it often took an oppositional attitude toward the measures of the newly established Nationalist Government. Although the Red Spear Society participated in tax-resistance struggles, its main targets were county governments, warlords, and tax clerks; it had no intention of overthrowing the government. The Red Spear Society claimed that its leaders were suitable candidates for emperor, but unlike the White Lotus Society it did not go further into power-seizing rebellion. Under the leadership of local notables, the Red Spear Society would resist the government but would not launch large-scale rebellions. If a regime could protect the interests of local notables, Red Spear Society resistance would greatly diminish. Although the Red Spear Society occasionally engaged in plunder, it never lost its basic purpose of defense and protecting the interests of property owners. The Red Spear Society would resist modernizing measures such as Western-style schools, but unlike the Boxers it was not anti-foreign; it even protected the charitable work of the foreign-run China International Famine Relief Commission.

The Red Spear Society generally maintained good discipline. Its ordinary rules had four articles: 1. Do not rape women; 2. Do not rob property; 3. Do not kill or set fires; 4. Do not insult or curse the gods and Buddhas. It was believed that those who violated the prohibitions would lose their magical powers and be killed by bullets. Many Red Spear Societies drew up disciplinary regulations, but such rules were difficult to put into practice. A set of formally published regulations was created in 1927 by the Henan gentryman Wang Yinchuan, printed in tens of thousands of copies and distributed, and regarded as the common rules of the Red Spear Society; all members were required to swear to observe them strictly. The regulations consisted of twenty articles. The first clearly stated that the purpose of the society was to enable the people, through an armed organization, to practice self-defense so that they could live and work in peace. The later articles emphasized filial piety toward parents and elder brothers, love of country and hometown, sharing weal and woe, and so on. This set of regulations was mostly mechanically copied from the model of military discipline, largely idealistic, detached from reality, and never actually implemented.

== History ==
=== 1921–1925 ===
From the 1920s onward, the membership of the Red Spear Society grew larger, its factions more numerous, and its spread wider, being most prevalent in the three provinces of Henan, Shandong, and Hebei.{ Until 1923, the Red Spear Society did not directly oppose the authorities, but focused on dealing with the threat of bandits. Only when the authorities interfered with defensive activities did the Red Spear Society turn its spear against the government. Wherever the government made efforts to suppress bandits, the Red Spear Society was willing to cooperate. For example, in Jiangsu Suining County, most Red Spear Society members were part of the regular defensive forces, because the local government only required farming households to contribute manpower to the militia without paying various miscellaneous levies, and the militia leaders were elected by the peasants themselves rather than appointed by the government. Bandits were the main factor driving the organization of the Red Spear Society, while the predatory nature of the armies was also a primary cause of popular self-defense. When warlord soldiers ravaged the North China Plain to make up for shortfalls in provisions and pay, peasants began turning to defense against and targeting these invaders. The activity areas of the Red Spear Society also expanded from bandit-plagued regions to the central areas of military occupation. In 1923, Wu Peifu sought to utilize the power of the Red Spear Society, separately appointing leaders such as Yin Zixin, Lou Baixun, and Gao Xianzhou as commander-in-chief of the Henan Guard Army, brigade commanders, and so on, with titles numbering in the thousands. In the same year, the Red Spear Society clashed with troops in Henan Lushi County. At that time, Shaanxi troops occupied the county, not only imposing heavy taxes of all kinds but also conscripting large numbers of civilian laborers. The peasants were filled with indignation; the Red Spear Society and other local self-defense organizations formed a joint force of 100,000 that surrounded the county seat, vowing to expel the Shaanxi troops. After negotiations with county officials, an agreement was reached: most of the Shaanxi troops withdrew, leaving only one division, and forced levies or arbitrary conscription were prohibited. However, the remaining division colluded with bandits instead of suppressing them, so the Red Spear Society and others continued demanding their expulsion and again launched a large-scale siege of the city.

In 1925, the focus of Red Spear Society activities shifted to the anti-tax struggle. At that time, warlords controlled vast territories, imposed heavy and arbitrary taxes, and issued paper currency indiscriminately; peasants in the occupied areas began uniting in resistance and cooperative defense. The Red Spear Society evolved from organizations based solely on individual villages into alliances covering extensive regions. Henan was the center of these allied forces, with headquarters usually established along the railway lines—the very routes along which warlord armies expanded. The most famous battles occurred during the oppressive rule of Henan military governor Yue Weijun and his successor Wu Peifu. Yue Weijun was a subordinate of Feng Yuxiang and continuously extracted resources from the peasants, especially those along the railway lines. The Red Spear Society established its headquarters in Xingyang County at the junction of the Beijing–Hankou Railway and the Longhai Railway. In 1925, about 500,000 Red Spear Society members emerged in the Xingyang area, stockpiling grain and casting weapons. Because the county magistrate arrested the father of a Red Spear Society leader from neighboring Xingze County, in early 1926 about 13,000 Red Spear Society members attacked the Xingyang county government, looted the arsenal, broke open the prison, released the leader’s father and other prisoners, and burned the magistrate’s home. Government troops eventually suppressed this rebellion. In Qi County, 120 kilometers east of Xingyang, the Red Spear Society’s resistance was even more intense; leader Lou Baixun commanded about 300,000 Red Spear Society members from three or four neighboring counties. Warlord Wu Peifu regarded contacting the Qi County Red Spear Society as the key to occupying Henan and offered Lou Baixun a high military rank along with a three-year tax exemption for the members, thereby obtaining the Red Spear Society’s help in defeating Yue Weijun’s army and seizing Henan. But the Red Spear Society’s good fortune did not last; after taking power, Wu Peifu quickly turned against them, shot four Red Spear Society leaders, ordered the society disarmed, and restored heavy taxes. Lou Baixun called on the members to refuse to surrender their weapons and continue the joint anti-tax struggle.

=== 1926–1928 ===
In May 1926, Red Spear Societies in various places began to resist Wu Peifu. In March and April of that year, a demonstration by several thousand peasants in Qi County succeeded, resulting in the reorganization of the tax bureau personnel, and the Red Spear Society regained control of local administration. Wu Peifu mobilized a large army to destroy Bailouzhai, the village where Lou Baixun lived. Lou Baixun escaped beforehand, but the remaining five thousand residents were all killed, and Bailouzhai was occupied by Wu’s troops. Lou Baixun resolved to repay in kind, gathering more than ten thousand Red Spear Society members from neighboring villages to attack Bailouzhai, but due to insufficient strength they were forced to withdraw after one week. Lou Baixun escaped again, and the surviving Red Spear Society members vented their anger on neighboring Sui County, surrounding the county seat with guns, cannons, and scaling ladders, and rejecting mediation and peace proposals from a foreign missionary. At this point troops occupying Qi County came to relieve the siege. Lou Baixun’s remaining forces joined with more than a thousand bandits from Anhui Bozhou and went to attack the city of Huaiyang County; when this proved unsuccessful, they turned to harassing and plundering nearby villages. Eventually the local militia and regular troops combined forces and successfully drove out these unwelcome Red Spear Society members and bandits. The case of Lou Baixun shows that if the Red Spear Society lost its village strongholds, it could also become plunderers like bandits.

The strength of the Red Spear Society reached its peak during the Northern Expedition, and the Northern Expedition led to a surge in Red Spear Society rebellions. In the summer of 1926, the Kuomintang launched the Northern Expedition. In northern Anhui the Red Spear Society and bandits joined forces against the Northern Expeditionary Army; the Red Spear Society organized around fifty thousand followers, attacked the city of Nanyang County in Henan, and sabotaged the Beijing–Hankou Railway to prevent the Nationalist army from advancing north. In 1927 the Red Spear Society in Henan province alone numbered 1.5 million, and adding those in Hebei, Shandong, and Anhui the total exceeded 3 million. By this time, in addition to red-tasseled spears, they possessed quite a number of modern firearms, most obtained from various armies; their power was sufficient not only to defend against bandits but also to influence the political situation, and they controlled 90 percent of the peasant armed forces in Henan. In the spring of that year the Red Spear Society attacked the warlord Wei Yisan in southern Henan, attacked the bandit Zhang Zhigong in Luoyang, assisted in driving out the Fengtian Army in northern Henan, and helped inflict a major defeat on the Zhili–Shandong Allied Army in Anhui Bengbu. When the Northern Expeditionary Army reached Henan, the Red Spear Society rose again against Wu Peifu’s rule and finally defeated the warlord. Red Spear Society leader Lou Baixun wiped out his earlier humiliation by occupying Kaifeng, establishing an autonomous government, and appointing himself commander-in-chief of the autonomous army. In March of the same year several Red Spear Society groups in Henan Queshan County cooperated with troops to occupy the county seat and established a seven-member committee that monopolized county administration for three months. In June of the same year the Red Spear Society also separately plundered Henan Hua County and Hebei Yongnian County.

Occasional mutual attacks also occurred among different Red Spear Society groups. In early 1926 in Xingyang County, more than ten thousand members of the “Little Red School” clashed with several tens of thousands of their rivals the “Big Red School” and their allies, three thousand members of the Yellow Spear Society. After five hours of fierce fighting the Little Red School was victorious, the Yellow Spear Society collapsed, and the leader of the Big Red School was forced to pay 50,000 yuan in cash while his followers were absorbed and reorganized by the Little Red School. The Red Spear Society also occasionally conflicted with other secret societies. In 1926–1927 the Red Spear Society cooperated with the Heavenly Gate Society to stop the Fengtian Army, but unlike the Red Spear Society the Heavenly Gate Society was hostile to landlords and killed a number of landlords and local gentry, causing the two groups to become enemies. In 1928 the leader of the White Spear Society in Hebei Yongnian County was killed by the Heavenly Gate Society; in retaliation the White Spear Society murdered twenty or thirty Heavenly Gate Society members. The Heavenly Gate Society did not remain passive and burned the house of the White Spear Society leader, also burning his son to death. The two sides continued mutual retaliation. In Quzhou County the Red Spear Society also fought the Heavenly Gate Society, killing family members of its followers. In Henan Xinyang County, local desperadoes formed the “Guangdanhui” to engage in plundering and engaged in mutual killings with the Red Spear Society in the area. In 1928, after the Red Spear Society crushed bandits in Anhui Xuyi and Dingyuan County, the bandits fled to village strongholds near Xuzhou. Sometimes bandits would pose as Red Spear Society members, adopting certain rituals and using the name of the Red Spear Society to plunder and kidnap for ransom.

=== 1929–1937 ===
The Red Spear Society sometimes reluctantly cooperated with the Nationalist Government and sometimes openly resisted it. In the late 1920s the Kuomintang initially imposed high taxes and attempted to eradicate backward cultural practices, which aroused strong dissatisfaction among the Red Spear Society. Later the government was forced to abandon its extraction of resources from the countryside and reached a compromise with local defenders. The Red Spear Society was incorporated into the official defense system, and provincial governments ordered each county to establish Lianzhuanghui (Joint Village Associations).{ After villagers formed Red Spear Societies they often continued to call them Lianzhuanghui in order to comply with official regulations. For example, the so-called Lianzhuanghui in Jiangsu Suining County were composed almost entirely of Red Spear Society members and thus appeared legitimate. Where Red Spear Societies linked villages across townships, these large-scale alliances frequently also bore the name of Lianzhuanghui. Even after the Red Spear Society was incorporated into regular militia forces, they often continued to resist taxation. In Luoyang, for instance, although the Red Spear Society had been reorganized into the militia, they still refused to pay taxes, resulting in five county magistrates being dismissed within four months.{ The Red Spear Society at one point gradually moved toward open rebellion, turning the spearhead of resistance against government officials and reaching the point of challenging government orders, but their fundamental aim was to maintain rural power relations and protect local interests. During the ten years of Nanjing Nationalist Government rule, the Kuomintang was willing to compromise with rural gentry and local notables, adopting a policy of accommodation, reconciling and cooperating with local elites, and reducing taxes. Only after defeating the warlord Feng Yuxiang in 1930 and strengthening its power in the countryside was it able to dissolve the Red Spear Society or reorganize it into official militias. In 1930 and 1931 the Nationalist Government ordered that all former self-defense groups must either disband or be converted into militias, and the Red Spear Society then dramatically disappeared. By the early 1930s few defensive groups that retained the Red Spear Society name remained; the vast majority had been incorporated into the government-created, officially recognized militia system, and most Red Spear Societies erased their religious coloration. During the period of cooperation between the Nationalists and local elites, few Red Spear Society activities occurred. In 1935 a rare Red Spear Society uprising broke out in Jiangsu Pei County. Local officials attempted to carry out land registration to increase tax revenue; the landlords reorganized the Red Spear Society, attacked the police station, and smashed government offices.

The New York Times reported on the emergence of the Red Spears society in 1927 and reported that they fought against abusive warlords and bandits for peasants.

On 15 September, 1932, the day Japan recognised its puppet state Manchukuo, the Red Spears Society and Big Sword Society raided the coal mines at Fushun in the Fushun Attack Incident (撫順襲撃事件) where 5 Japanese were killed with their ears and noses hacked off and eyes gouged out and burned many Japanese buildings and equipment at the mine.

The Red Spear Society killed Japanese Captain Koga at Jinxi in Liaoning on 9 January 1933.

The Big Sword Society and Red Spear Society raided the Laohutai (老虎台) and Dongxiang (東郷) coal mines and massacred Japanese invasive settlers in the Pingdingshan incident (平項山事件) or Yangbaopu incident (楊柏堡事件).

In the Japanese Yasaka settler village over 30 Japanese settlers were killed by Chinese secret society raiders. At Qingzui mountain they killed 10 Japanese logging trees, raided the village and burned its headquarters after an initial raid on 12 March 1934 where the Chinese almost massacred the whole village until Japanese bombers came and they retreated.

== 1937-1945 ==
After the outbreak of the Second Sino-Japanese War, the Red Spear Society re-emerged. When the Japanese invaded North China and the Kuomintang withdrew from rural areas, local residents were forced to mount a spontaneous resistance, reorganizing the Red Spear Society and stepping forward once again to protect their communities. Initially aimed only at defending against bandits, their efforts later stemmed from patriotism. Coupled with the chaotic military discipline of the Japanese army at the time—where incidents of rape frequently occurred—the Red Spear Society and similar groups rose up to fight back, confronting the Japanese forces one after another. By the summer of 1938, the Red Spear Society could be found in virtually every village across Huaibei. In July 1938, 16 Red Spear Society units ambushed and attacked Japanese troops travelling from Guoyang County, Jiangsu, to Su County, killing more than 80 soldiers. An editorial in the Wanbao newspaper praised them: 'If they can operate under the leadership of the government, they will be able to perform even better than regular troops in combat against enemy forces.' In 1942, the Red Spear Society in Huaibei alone was said to have a membership of 500,000. Over 80 Japanese soldiers were killed by 16 Red Spears fighters while trying to enter Suzhou, Anhui from Guoyang County on 12 July, 1938, and someone said "If only they could be brought under government direction, they would be far more effective than the regular troops in fighting the enemy." In 1943, a Red Spear Society rebellion occurred in Yongqing County, Hebei, fiercely resisting the Japanese county garrison. From the spring of 1938 until the end of the War of Resistance in 1945, the Red Spear Society achieved repeated victories in fighting against bandits and the Japanese army. The Japanese army was occasionally able to suppress the Red Spear Society, employing a combination of suppression and appeasement as political tactics against them. In August 1938, the Japanese bribed 12 Red Spear Society leaders into signing an agreement to relinquish leadership over 1,500 members. Starting in 1942, the Japanese began systematically co-opting the Red Spear Society, attempting to replace it with the Japanese-sponsored 'Xinminhui' (New People's Society), though without success. The Red Spear Society effectively assisted Kuomintang troops in resisting the Japanese army. However, the Red Spear Society did not draw particularly close to the Nationalist Government, and friction still occasionally occurred between the two sides.

"Overthrow Manchoukuo", "Crush Japanese Imperialism" and "Protect the Nation, the People, and Our Homes" were among the slogans used in northeast China by Big Sword Society and Red Spears Society after 1931 when Japan invaded the region. Hundreds of Japanese were injured and massacred on the Tangyinxun (T’ang-yin-hsun) highway by the Red spears on March 1938. There were other ambushes like that from 1939-1943 by Red Spears in north China against Japanese causing major casualties to Japanese. Japanese were afraid of being beheaded and scalped due to religious beliefs about the afterlife and Japanese were terrified and refused to enter rural areas of Henan, Hebei and Shandong outside of roads, railways and cities after 1942 since the Red spears would scalp and behead Japanese.

The Red Spears used sword, spears and guns against the Japanese. A Red Spears religious ritual during battle was seen in 1938 in north Anhui by an NRA soldier. The Red Spear Society was involved in the Shandong anti-Japanese base area. Japan was forced to adopt a failed appeasement policy to Chinese secret societies like Tianmenhui during the war.

Japan also tried to do a failed appeasement policy to the Red Spears as they fought the Japanese. The Communist Party categorised the Red Spears into a counter revolutionary section and a revolutionary section as it sought to compartmentalise and recruit the "revolutionary" section during the war.

The North China Area Army under Takeo Imai issued a document on 3 September 1938 calling for unsuccessful efforts to get the Red Spear Society and Wu Peifu to defect to Japan. Takeo Imai wrote about the situation in his memoir.

The Japanese army issued a document on 18 June 1938 warning that the Japanese army committing rape caused Chinese secret societies like Big Sword Society and Red Spear Society to violently rally all Chinese in Southern Hebei, Henan and Shandong to kill Japanese and fight to the death, warning of the massive backlash it caused. It also cited a previous document called "Regarding the Customs of the Red Spear Society" it issued on 6 October 1937 about this. It warned the violent backlash by the Chinese secret societies was too much to handle and undermining the Japanese army's control and said Japan needed to implement a comfort women system to stop the rapes immediately and the document also admitted that the Japanese army knew rape was a war crime.

The Communist, Republican and Qing governments all were against secret societies.

=== 1946–1950 ===
The Red Spear Society continued until the Nationalist government relocated to Taiwan. As late as 1948 the Red Spear Society was still resisting Kuomintang rule and taxation, frequently active in northern and eastern Henan under the name of the White Spear Society. In the summer of 1950 conflict broke out between the Red Spear Society and the Chinese Communist Party. Because the government of Anhui Mengcheng County had imprisoned some peasants who refused to hand over surplus grain, several hundred secret members of the Red Spear Society burned down the district government office, killed the district head, and took control of the county seat. Afterwards more than a thousand Red Spear Society members hid in the sorghum fields beside the road and ambushed public security troops sent from Fuyang County to suppress them. The government then mobilized a larger force and recovered the county seat one month after the rebellion. Small groups of Red Spear Society reinforcements that had come from southern Shandong and eastern Henan were dispersed; local Red Spear Society members in Mengcheng attempted to resist the government troops but were unsuccessful, and their leader committed suicide with a red-tasseled spear.

The Red Spears Society are mentioned in western conspiracy books about Illuminati.

== See also ==
- Pingdingshan massacre
- Red Spears' uprising in Shandong (1928–1929)
- Secret society
- Warlord Rebellion in northeastern Shandong
