= Boxer =

Boxer most commonly refers to:

- Boxer (boxing), a competitor in the sport of boxing
- Boxer (dog breed), a breed of dog

Boxer or boxers may also refer to:

== Animal kingdom ==
- Boxer crab
- Boxer shrimp, a small group of decapod crustaceans
- Boxer snipe eel, Nemichthys curvirostris

== Film and television ==
- Boxer TV Access, a Swedish digital TV provider
- Boxer (1984 film), a 1984 Hindi-language film
- Boxer (2015 film), a 2015 Kannada-language film
- Boxer (2018 film) a 2018 Bengali-language film
- The Boxer (1997 film), a 1997 film starring Daniel Day-Lewis
- The Boxer (1958 film), a 1958 Mexican sports drama film
- The Boxer (2012 film), a 2012 short film starring Paul Barber
- The Boxer, aka Ripped Off, a 1972 Italian film starring Robert Blake and Ernest Borgnine
- The Boxers, a Hong Kong film of 1973

== Military ==
- Boxer (armoured fighting vehicle), a European, multi-role, armoured vehicle
- Boxer Rebellion, a 1900 armed conflict in China
  - Boxer movement, participants in the Boxer Rebellion
  - Boxer Protocol
- HMS Boxer, nine ships of the Royal Navy, 1797–2004
- USS Boxer, six US Navy ships
- Operation Boxer, a 1969 series of Israeli air attacks on Egyptian targets near the Suez Canal

== Music ==
- Boxer (band), a rock band formed in 1975
- Boxer (The National album), 2007
- Boxer (Johannes Oerding album), 2011
- "Boxers" (song), a 1995 song by Morrissey
- "The Boxer", a 1968 song by Simon & Garfunkel
- The Boxer (album), by Kele Okereke, 2010
- "The Boxer" (The Chemical Brothers song), 2005
- "Boxer", a 2004 song by Sara Groves from the album The Other Side of Something
- "The Boxer", a 2009 song by Editors from the album In This Light and on This Evening
- "The Boxer", a 2001 song by Carbon Leaf from the album Echo Echo

== People ==
- Boxer (surname)
- BoxeR (Lim Yo-hwan, born 1980), professional StarCraft player

== Transport and engineering ==
- Boxer engine, a type of internal combustion engine
- Peugeot Boxer, a van
- Ferrari Berlinetta Boxer, a sports car

== Other ==
- Boxer shorts or Boxer briefs, two styles of male undergarment based on shorts
- Boxer (grape), another name for the German wine grape Bukettraube
- Boxer (magazine), a magazine printed in Turkey
- Boxer (Animal Farm), a character in George Orwell's Animal Farm
- Balrog (Street Fighter), a Street Fighter character often called Boxer
- Boxers (graphic novel), by Gene Luen Yang, 2013
- The Boxer (manhwa), a South Korean manhwa series
- The Boxers (sculpture), a 1987 work by Keith Haring in Berlin, Germany
- Boxer at Rest, a Hellenistic Greek sculpture created between 330 and 50 BCE
- Boxer Codex, a manuscript written circa 1595 containing illustrations depicting the inhabitants of the Philippines at the time of their contact with Spaniards
- Boxer disease or Dementia pugilistica, chronic brain injury caused by blows to the head
- Boxer primer, a type of centerfire ammunition primer

== See also ==
- Boxing (disambiguation)
