= Fist Fight (disambiguation) =

Fist Fight is a 2017 American film.

Fist Fight or fist fight may also refer to:

- Boxing, a combat sport and martial art
  - Bare-knuckle boxing, boxing without the use of boxing gloves
- Fist Fight (TV series), a Hong Kong television series
- "Fist Fight", a song by For the Fallen Dreams from the 2011 album Back Burner

== See also ==
- Fist Fighters, characters in the animated television series Wander Over Yonder
- Boxing (disambiguation)
- Pugilism (disambiguation)
