= Konstantin Petrovich Nechaev =

Russian Imperial Army officer and White émigré (1883–1946)

Konstantin Nechaev
- Константин Петрович Нечаев
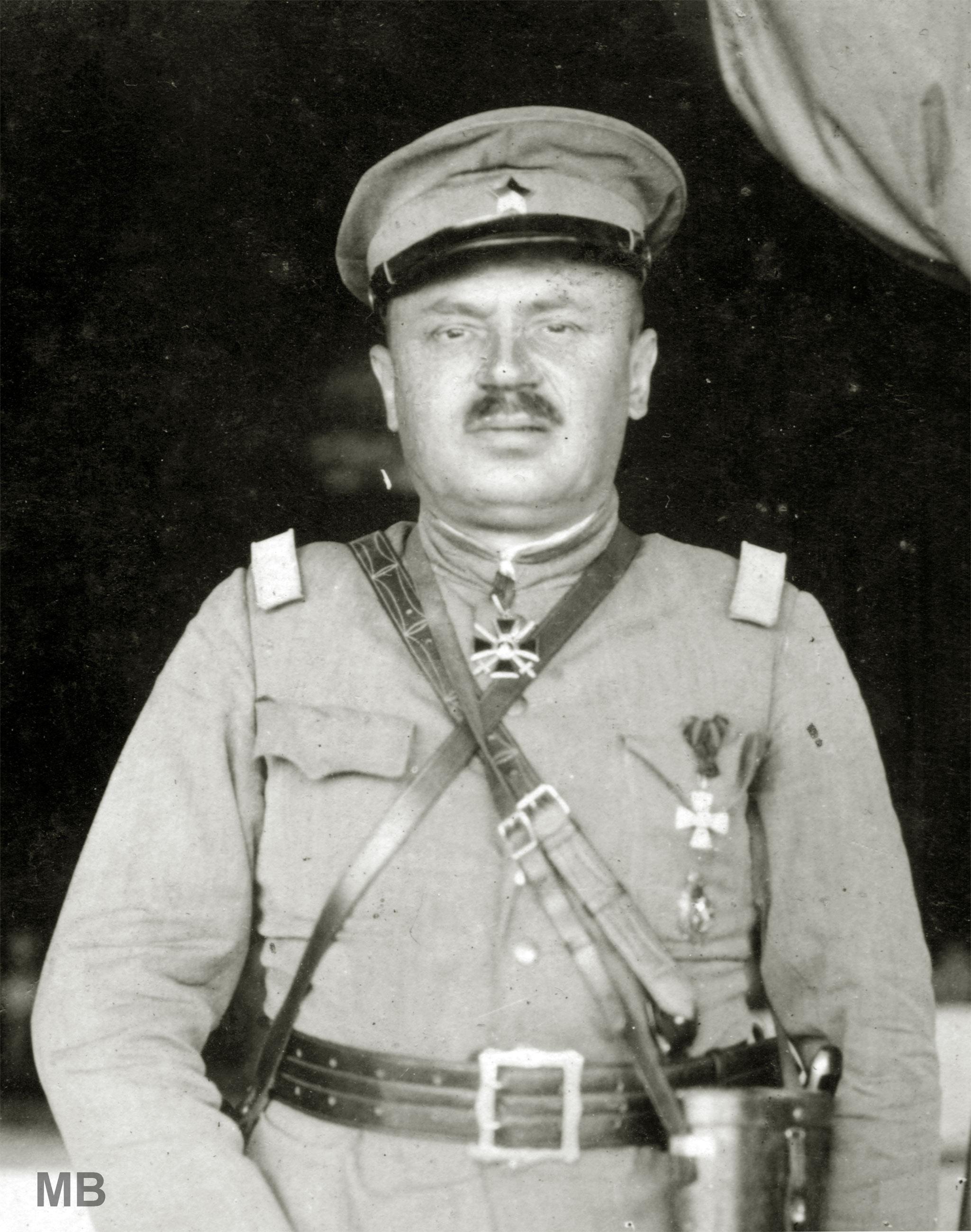
- Nechaev c. 1926
- Born: 31 May 1883; Łódź, Russian Poland, Russian Empire
- Died: 5 February 1946 (aged 62) (Note: A Soviet source from 1965 falsely stated that Nechaev was killed in action fighting the NRA in 1927.); Chita, Russian SFSR, Soviet Union
- Cause of death: Execution by hanging
- Military career
- Allegiance: Russia; White movement Republic of China
- Branch: Imperial Russian Army; White Army; Fengtian clique's Shandong Army; Northeastern Army
- Service years: 1904–1921, 1924–1929
- Rank: Lieutenant general
- Units: 5th Cavalry Division; People's Army of Komuch; Kappelevtsy; White movement in Transbaikal; Fengtian foreign legion
- Commands: Volga Cavalry Brigade; 65th Infantry Division
- Conflicts: World War I Russian Civil War; Warlord Era; Northern Expedition; Warlord Rebellion in northeastern Shandong (possibly); Sino-Soviet conflict (1929)
- Awards: Order of St. George, 4th class
- Other work: Head of White émigré "Russian National Community" and "Bureau of Russian Emigrants in Manchuria"

Konstantin Petrovich Nechaev (Note: His surname has been alternatively transliterated as Nechayev, Nechanev, Nechiev, Nechayeff, Netchaieff, or Nichaeff. He was also known as Nieh-chia-fu by the Chinese.) (Russian: Константин Петрович Нечаев, Polish: Konstantin Pietrowicz Nieczajew; 31 May 1883 – 5 February 1946) was an Imperial Russian Army officer and White movement leader, who commanded a large Russian mercenary army in China from 1924 to 1929. Fighting for the Fengtian clique warlords Zhang Zuolin and Zhang Zongchang, Nechaev took part in several wars of the Chinese Warlord Era until his mercenary force was destroyed in the Northern Expedition. Thereafter, he mostly retired from military service and became a White émigré community leader in Manchuria. Captured by SMERSH during the Soviet invasion of Manchuria, Nechaev was executed by Soviet authorities in 1946.

== Early life and World War I ==
Konstantin Nechaev was born in Łódź, Russian Poland, on 31 May 1883, and later joined the Russian Imperial Army. He graduated from the Moscow cadet corps in 1902 and Tver Cavalry Junker School in 1904. He was commissioned as a cavalry officer in the 5th Lithuania Ulan Regiment, 1st Brigade of the 5th Cavalry Division. In 1907 Nechayev was transferred to the 5th Kargopol Dragoon Regiment in the same brigade. As of January 1909 he was a poruchik in that unit. Nechaev fought with the 5th Kargopol Dragoon Regiment in World War I, and rose in the ranks during the conflict. By 1916 he was listed as a staff rittmeister (Russian: штабс-ротмистр), a senior officer rank in the Russian cavalry. Promoted to colonel in 1917, he was also awarded the Order of St. George, 4th class, among other decorations, in course of the war.

== Russian Civil War and relocation to Manchuria ==
As Russia collapsed into internal conflict following the October Revolution, the 5th Kargopol Dragoon Regiment moved to Samara in January 1918. In August, Nechaev joined the anti-Bolshevik People's Army of Komuch as commander of the 1st Kazan Cavalry Volunteer Regiment, and became leader of the Kazan Dragoon Regiment in September. Serving as part of Vladimir Kappel's White army (nicknamed kappelevtsy), he was eventually appointed head of the Volga Cavalry Brigade in January 1919, and led this unit during several battles of the Eastern Front of the Russian Civil War. He fought at Ufa, Zlatoust, Chelyabinsk, Tobolsk, and Petropavlovsk. The war increasingly turned against the anti-Communist White movement, however, and Kappel's army was forced to retreat into Transbaikal during the Great Siberian Ice March. Though Nechaev survived the retreat, the White army suffered heavy casualties, among them Kappel who died of frostbite and pneumonia.

Nechaev subsequently joined Ataman Grigory Mikhaylovich Semyonov's White army in Transbaikal. Commanding one division and a cavalry brigade in Semyonov's army, Nechaev served as major general and was promoted to lieutenant general in April 1920. By July 1921, Nechaev and 300 of his followers were possibly fighting in Mongolia alongside the army of Roman von Ungern-Sternberg. He retired from the army in 1921, and went into exile in China, settling down in the Manchurian city of Harbin. There, he joined a White Russian monarchist alliance. Meanwhile, the last White regime in Russia, the Provisional Priamurye Government, collapsed in 1922, and the Russian Far East was occupied by the Red Army. Thousands of White Russian soldiers subsequently fled from Vladivostok to China rather than surrender to the Communists. The White ex-soldiers often kept their military equipment, and even took their armoured trains with them to China.

At the time, the Republic of China was engulfed by civil war and factional violence. Its central government in Beijing had become largely powerless, while warlords controlled much of the country and fought each other for supremacy. One of the most powerful Chinese warlords was Zhang Zuolin, leader of the Fengtian clique and de facto ruler of Manchuria, where many of the White Russian ex-soldiers had settled down. Zhang considered these Russians to be veterans who were experienced in modern warfare, and consequently decided to recruit them into his armed forces. He ordered one of his Russian assistants, Colonel Chekhov, to mobilize a foreign legion in Mukden in 1924. In turn, Chekov contacted Nechaev and asked him to raise a unit in Harbin.

== Mercenary service in China ==
=== Operations of the foreign legion 1924–1926 ===
Nechaev accepted, and recruited about 150 White Russians as mercenaries for Zhang's army, organizing them into two companies and leading them to Shanhaiguan District in August 1924. Mercenary service was attractive for White émigrés due to the fact that many of them had problems finding stable employment, and the warlords at least offered a regular income. Nechaev was popular among his troops, and his unit was quickly expanded, counting about 700 White Russians by the start of the Second Zhili–Fengtian War. In this conflict against Wu Peifu's Zhili clique, the Russians fought as part of the Fengtian foreign legion which also included 300 Japanese mercenaries and two Chinese companies. Nechaev commanded both the White Russians as well as the Chinese, while the Japanese operated under their own leaders. The foreign legion also included several armoured trains that the White Russians had brought with them from Russia. Nechaev and his troops fought as part of General Jin's First Army during the Second Zhili–Fengtian War. In course of these operations, Nechaev and several other White Russian mercenaries were featured in the propaganda film Modern Warfare in China 1924–1925 which was produced by the Soviet Union. As the Soviet government was opportunistically supporting the anti-Left Fengtian clique at the time, the White Russian general and his fellow anti-communist soldiers were portrayed favorably and sympathetically by the film's director, a Red Army colonel named Grinevskii. The "honeymoon between Zhang and the Soviets (...) was brief in the extreme", however, and had already ended by mid-1925. The Soviet government instead increased its support for forces opposed to Zhang, such as warlord Feng Yuxiang and the Kuomintang in southern China.

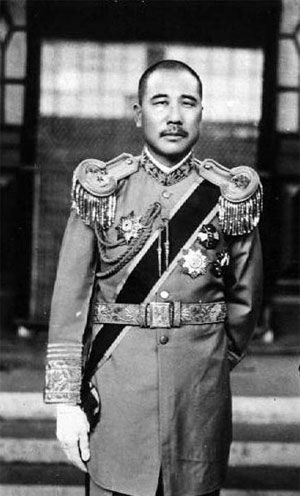
Zhang Zongchang, the warlord who served as Nechaev's direct superior for much of his mercenary career

Following the Fengtian clique's victory over the Zhili forces in November 1924, Nechaev led his mercenary force to Jinan, where he was placed under the command of Zhang Zongchang, the ruler of Shandong and a subordinate of Zhang Zuolin. Zhang Zongchang served as Nechaev's direct superior for the following years, and allowed the Russian lieutenant general to operate largely autonomous. Nechaev selected several veteran White Russian officers for his staff, and some Chinese officers as interpreters. Nechaev and his troops next took part in an expedition to conquer Shanghai from warlord Qi Xieyuan for the Fengtian clique. By this time, the foreign legion already counted 800 officers, and 2,000 regular soldiers who had previously fought in the armies of Semyonov and Alexander Kolchak, and four armoured trains. The Russians fought with distinction at Wuxi and in the conquest of Shanghai in January 1925, and then again when Sun Chuanfang, Qi Xieyuan's superior, attempted to retake Shanghai soon after. As his forces were overextended, however, Zhang Zuolin had to withdraw from Shanghai in February. Following the retreat, Nechaev suffered a major defeat, when he and one armoured train under his command were trapped near Suizhou. Their Chinese adversaries had pulled up the rail, and took this opportunity to massacre almost all mercenaries on board the train. Nechaev managed to survive the incident, but lost a part of his leg during the bitter fighting. Overall, the Russians earned a reputation as extremely capable fighting force, becoming "Zhang Zongchang's crack troops", but were also feared due to their high indiscipline and extreme brutality against civilians and prisoners of war. In November 1925, Leon Trotsky mentioned Nechaev in a speech to the Kislovodsk Soviet, claiming that he and his troops were paid by Great Britain to support Chinese monarchism.

Despite his severe wound, Nechaev returned to duty in 1926, and came to directly command the 65th Infantry Division, consisting of one Chinese and one Russian brigade. The latter was about 3,765 men strong, and was nicknamed the "Nechaev Brigade" or "Nechaev Detachment". He also remained the de facto commander of all Russian troops in the Fengtian foreign legion, who counted about 5,270 overall by this point. In early 1926 during the Anti-Fengtian War, Nechaev commanded one of his armoured trains in a battle against another armoured train in service of Feng Yuxiang. He managed to defeat Feng's train, which had been built by Soviet advisors. Due to the increasing Soviet support for several enemies of the Fengtian clique in the late 1920s, Nechaev and the White Russians under his leadership increasingly perceived their mercenary service as "continuation of the holy war against Bolshevism".

=== Northern Expedition and end of the foreign legion ===
Later in 1926, Nechaev led three of his armoured trains on a rampage through the Chinese countryside, "machine-gunning civilians and stealing everything moveable". In an attempt to stop the White Russians, locals pulled up the railways, but this only resulted in Nechaev's forces sacking the nearest town. Soon after, the 65th Infantry Division suffered heavy casualties in another armed conflict with Sun Chuanfang, so that "only several hundred" Russians were left in the unit by 1927, when war erupted between the Fengtian clique and the National Revolutionary Army (NRA) of the Kuomintang. Reduced in manpower, Nechaev and his forces mostly contributed to the Fengtian clique's resistance against the NRA's Northern Expedition by using their remaining armoured trains. In March 1927, the Chinese Communist Party (CCP) launched an armed uprising in Shanghai against the local warlord garrison of Zhang Zongchang and Sun Chuanfang, who had allied himself with the Fengtian clique to resist the NRA. Nechaev's troops were among the 3,000 defenders of Shanghai's Zhabei district, and were only ousted from the city after heavy fighting with the CCP insurgents and NRA reinforcements.

The war increasingly turned against the warlords and the White Russians as well as their Chinese allies were steadily driven north by the NRA. Following Zhang Zuolin's death in June 1928, his son Zhang Xueliang, the "Young Marshal", took over leadership of the Fengtian clique. He wanted to make peace with the NRA, and eventually fell out with Zhang Zongchang over this issue. Nechaev's men still had at least three armoured trains under their control at the time, and initially assisted Zhang Zongchang in invading Manchuria to topple Xueliang. After crossing the Luan River, however, Zhang Zongchang was trapped by the now-allied troops of the NRA and the "Young Marshal"; realizing that the position of their superior was lost, the White Russians defected and turned the guns of their trains on their former allies. Zhang Zongchang was defeated, and the White Russian mercenaries were mostly demobilized thereafter.

== Later years in Manchuria and execution ==
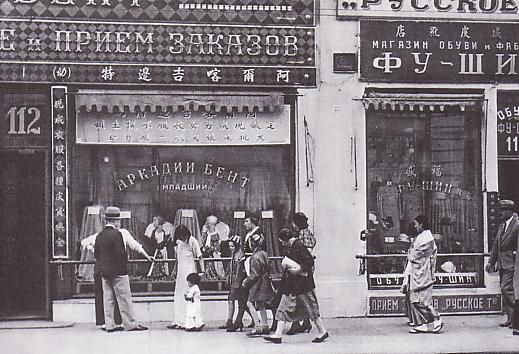
In his later years, Nechaev served as community leader for the White émigré population of Manchukuo (Harbin Russian stores pictured).

Following the Fengtian foreign legion's end, Nechaev returned to Manchuria to retire, living in Dalian. Nevertheless, there were rumours in early 1929 that Nechaev had assisted Zhang Zongchang during a rebellion to retake Shandong. Though these rumours were not confirmed, historian Philip S. Jowett considered it plausible that Nechaev had helped his old superior. In any case, the uprising failed. In late 1929, conflict erupted between the Chinese Nationalist government and the Soviet Union. The Chinese promptly rearmed the White Russians living in Manchuria to assist them against the Red Army; Soviet authorities believed that Nechaev was among the commanders of the White Russian troops fighting with the Chinese Northeastern Army. One account of the conflict stated that the White Russian detachment under Nechaev's command continued to raid Soviet territory even after hostilities had officially ceased, and also falsely claimed that he was killed in clashes with Soviet border guards in January 1930.

Following the Sino-Soviet conflict, the Soviet authorities demanded that all White Russians had to be dismissed from both the Northeastern Army and the Chinese Eastern Railway, while their leaders, among them Nechaev, were to be expelled from Manchuria. Nechaev consequently fully retired from military service, but remained in Manchuria, where he became head of two White émigré community organizations: The "Russian National Community" in 1930, and later the "Bureau of Russian Emigrants in Manchuria". He continued to live in Manchuria after the Japanese invasion of 1931, and the establishment of Manchukuo. The Soviet Union invaded Manchukuo in 1945, and arrested numerous White Russians living there. Nechaev was among those captured by SMERSH and sent to the Russian Soviet Federative Socialist Republic. Tried by before the 6th Guards Tank Army's military tribunal, he was sentenced to death in November 1945, and subsequently executed by hanging in Chita in 1946. He was rehabilitated by the Transbaikal Military District in April 1992.
