= Warlord Rebellion in northeastern Shandong =

1929 uprising in the Republic of China

- Part of the Nanjing decade
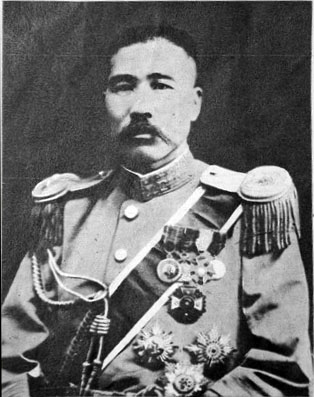
- Zhang Zongchang, instigator and leader of the rebellion
Date	January–May 1929
Location	Northeastern Shandong, Republic of China
Result	Government victory; warlord forces dispersed or destroyed

Belligerents
Republic of China Self-defense groups: Red Spear Society; White Spear Society	Warlord alliance Supported by: Japan (suspected)

Commanders and leaders
Liu Zhennian	Zhang Zongchang; Chu Yupu (POW); Huang Feng-chi; Sun Dianying; Li Hsi Tung

Units involved
National Revolutionary Army (NRA): Third Division (Liu's private army)	Warlord armies: Ex-Shandong and Zhili Army soldiers; Russian mercenaries (rumoured); NRA mutineers, defectors and bandits

Strength
c. 20,000 (January) c. 7,000 (late February)	c. 3,000 (January); 27,000+ (late February); 1,000–4,500 (May)

Casualties and losses
1,500+ killed, thousands deserted or defected	Thousands killed
- Thousands of civilians killed

The Warlord Rebellion in northeastern Shandong was an uprising of several allied Chinese warlord armies under the leadership of Zhang Zongchang in 1929. The rebels wanted to regain their former territories in Shandong from Liu Zhennian, the man who had defected from Zhang to the Nationalist government in Nanjing during the Northern Expedition. After some initial successes, the rebels were defeated due to the indiscipline of their forces. In the end, the uprising failed to topple Liu Zhennian's rule over eastern Shandong, but resulted in high civilian casualties and widespread destruction at the hands of both sides in the conflict.

== Background ==
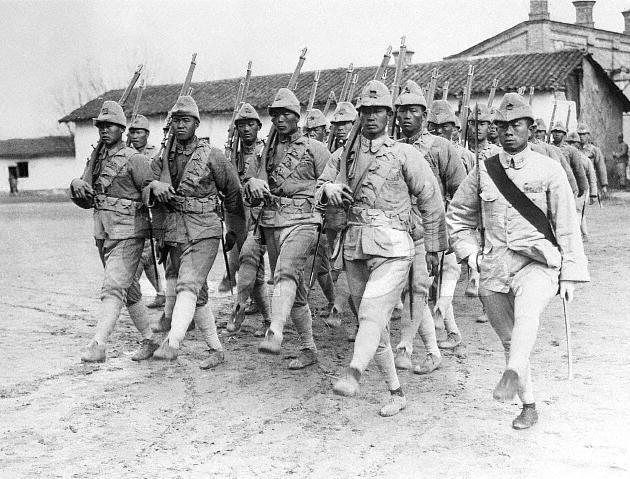
Soldiers under Zhang Zongchang's command in 1924. Although his men respected and feared Zhang, their quality as soldiers suffered from lack of training and weaponry, as well as indiscipline.

After the death of Yuan Shikai in 1916, China disintegrated as various military commanders seized power throughout the country. Organized into cliques, they controlled the Beiyang government and constantly fought against each other for supremacy in what came to be known as the Warlord Era. One of the most notorious warlords from this period was Zhang Zongchang, who was the de facto ruler of Shandong at the time and known for his brutality. Although he was hated and feared by the civilian population due to his authoritarian methods, the so-called "Dogmeat General" commanded a relatively loyal army and managed to keep Shandong under his control for much of the late 1920s; in this he was aided by subordinates such as Chu Yupu and Liu Zhennian. Zhang's rule came to an end, however, when Chiang Kai-shek's Nationalist government defeated him during the Northern Expedition in 1928. Like many other warlords, Zhang was not willing to accept his reduced status and exile in Dalian. In order to regain his former power base, he began to plot an uprising with his long-time follower Chu Yupu and another warlord, Huang Feng-chi. Zhang also allegedly tried to enlist the help of the White Russian commanders Grigory Semyonov and General Konstantin Petrovich Nechaev. Historian Philip S. Jowett considered it possible that Nechaev, and a few other Russian mercenaries joined Zhang for his attempted comeback.

In his plans to recapture Shandong, Zhang Zongchang had a number of important assets: firstly, tens of thousands of his former soldiers still remained in Shandong. Most of them had not been able to join the National Revolutionary Army (NRA) after Zhang's defeat, and remained unemployed. In a precarious economic situation and mostly still loyal to their old commander, they joined his forces for a second time. These Shandong and Zhili Army ex-soldiers were not necessarily reliable nor combat-effective, however. In the face of the Nationalist forces during the Northern Expedition, Zhang's followers had "melted away without putting up much of a fight", and were even more lacking in training and weaponry now that they had been demobilized. While Zhang's forces were not in the best shape, they had the advantage of not having to face regular NRA troops in eastern Shandong, as the area was under the control of Zhang's former associate Liu Zhennian, nicknamed "The Killer". Liu had defected to the Nationalists during the Northern Expedition, and was awarded to rule eastern Shandong like an "unreformed warlord" without intervention since October 1928. Although de jure part of the NRA, Liu's forces were typical of the average warlord, and suffered from little training in comparison to regular armies. Liu was not particularly loyal to the Nationalist government in Nanjing, and he had no support from the local population which he had terrorized, having driven them into rebellion in some areas. The counties of Laiyang and Zhaoyuan were held by Red Spear Society peasant insurgents by early 1929. Lastly, Zhang possibly had covert financial support from the Empire of Japan, which increased his confidence in recapturing Shandong.

== Rebellion ==
=== Start of the conflict ===
Map of Shandong showing important locations of the rebellion.

Security conditions in eastern Shandong were already deteriorating before the arrival of Zhang, as Liu's garrison at Longkou and Huangxian mutinied in late January 1929. The local commanders, namely Liu Kai-tai, Li Hsi-tung, Sze Tien-pin, and Kao Peng-chi had reportedly planned to overthrow Liu Zhennian, prompting him to dismiss them, whereupon they revolted and renounced their allegiance to the Nanjing government. Their 3,000 forces, consisting of ex-Zhili and Shandong troops went on to completely loot Longkou, Huangxian, and Dengzhou. Foreigners who had lived in these towns fled onto two Japanese warships that harbored at the coast by chance. The violence was only quelled when an additional Imperial Japanese Navy detachment arrived to protect Japanese citizens in the area, soon followed by 20,000 troops loyal to Liu. Instead of resisting, the mutineers fled into areas held by the Red Spear insurgents. Allying themselves with the peasant rebels, the mutineers were reportedly preparing an attack on Longkou by early February. The morale of Liu's remaining forces in the area was extremely low.

In course of February, the rebels gained the upper hand and Liu was pushed back to the surroundings of Zhifu, his de facto capital and the most important city of northeastern Shandong. It is likely that the whole mutiny had been organized or at least influenced by Zhang, and when he, Chu and Huang landed with a small retinue at Longkou on 19 February, the mutineers promptly joined them. The warlords then set up their headquarters at Dengzhou, and marched on Zhifu. Fighting started near Fushan, 15 miles west of Zhifu, in late February. By that time, Zhang's army counted 5,000 soldiers, but he was soon reinforced by Huang who managed to gather an army of 26,000 men. Their opponent, Liu, had much fewer NRA soldiers at his disposal and would receive only "half-hearted" support from the central government during the rebellion: 200,000 rounds of ammunition and 50,000 yuans as war chest. His military position was further impaired by the fact that part of Shandong was occupied by the Imperial Japanese Army that refused to allow NRA reinforcements through. In this way, the Japanese deliberately or unintentionally aided Zhang's uprising.

=== First battle at Zhifu and stalemate ===
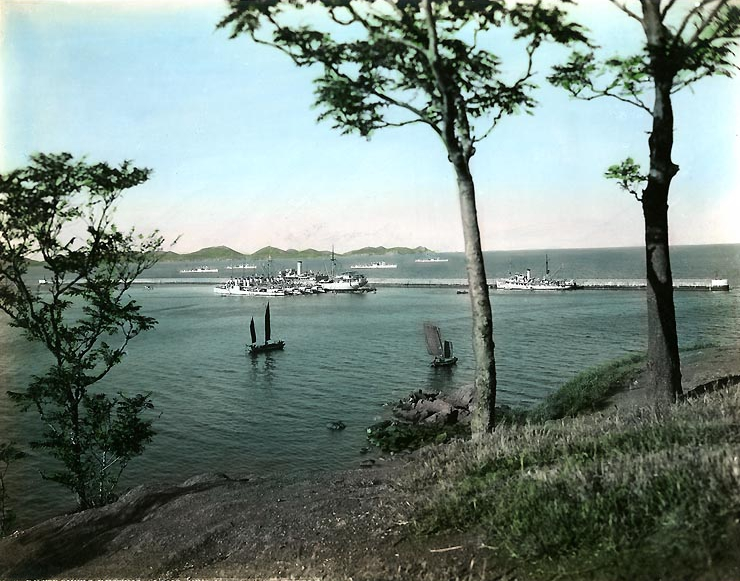
United States Navy warships off Zhifu in the 1930s. Several foreign warships were stationed at the town during the warlord rebellion to ensure the security of the foreigners active in eastern Shandong.

After some skirmishes, Zhang arrived at Zhifu with a large force of about 24,000 troops, while Liu had only been able to muster 7,000 men for the town's defense. The two sides clashed on 21 February, and the rebels were defeated despite their superior numbers, probably because they were badly armed and trained in comparison to the NRA soldiers. Furthermore, Zhang Zongchang, who might have rallied his men, was nowhere to be found during the engagement. The warlord army lost 500 men (200 dead, 300 captured) and, more importantly, 2,000–3,000 rifles as well as 15 machine guns. Zhang and his allies remained undaunted by this first setback, and retreated to Dengzhou. What followed were weeks of "desultory fighting" during which government as well as rebel troops terrorized the local population, while the warlord alliance entered negotiations with Liu in hopes of convincing him to surrender. On 25 February, there were reports that Liu's army had suffered from further defections, as 15,000 active troops near Weihaiwei had allegedly declared for Zhang. By the end of the month, Zhang claimed to control all of eastern Shandong with the exception of Zhifu and its surroundings.

Around this time, Zhang publicly announced that a coalition of warlords, including himself, Chu Yupu, Yan Xishan, Wu Peifu, Bai Chongxi, Qi Xieyuan, and a number of Manchurian military commanders would soon launch a massive campaign against the KMT. No actual alliance was formed, however, and the "whole affair died down again, as suddenly as it had started". Zhang did however manage to contact one NRA regiment consisting of former Shandong Army members in Beijing, and convinced them to revolt on 2 March 1929. Their uprising in Beijing was quickly crushed, and the Nanjing government consequently took "precautions" to prevent further ex-Shandong soldiers in the NRA from rebelling.

Meanwhile, warlord soldiers razed six towns and 50 villages, partially in retaliation for the murder of a rebel officer and an assassination attempt on Zhang, but also out of frustration about the disappointing course of the rebellion as well as simple greed and vandalism. Captured women and girls were sold as slaves on Huangxian's market for 10–20 Mexican dollars (the Mexican silver dollar was the main currency used in China at the time). One group of rebels under General Li Hsi Tung marched westward and plundered Laizhou, before returning to the frontlines near Zhifu. In comparison, Liu's forces behaved little better. The Nationalist-aligned warlord ignored any orders from Chiang Kai-shek, and his men posed as "protectors" at the same time as they robbed and abused the local peasants. Many citizens of Zhifu had so little confidence in the government forces' capabilities to end the rebellion that they fled to Dalian. There was also growing international concern about the security of foreigners in eastern Shandong. As result, several foreign warships, including the USS Trenton, HMS Cornflower, and Japanese cruiser Kiso, had arrived at Zhifu to prevent anti-foreign pogroms that could erupt due to the chaotic situation.

This chaos allowed the Red Spear Society which already occupied parts of the hinterland to expand its influence, as many locals turned to the peasant rebels to protect them. Other villages in Shandong formed their own self-defense groups, but these did not necessarily cooperate. In Tung-nan County, at least three irregular armed groups were active at the time of the warlord incursion, namely the small "Southern Army", the 2,000-men strong force of Wang Zicheng, and a White Spear Society branch. Although the latter had been explicitly mobilized to protect locals from Zhang Zongchang's forces, it instead had to defend itself from attacks by the other two bands. After defeating them, the White Spears became rather popular and powerful in Shandong's hinterland. Nevertheless, none of the secret societies could openly challenge the rampaging soldiers, as the peasant militias were too poorly armed.

=== Height and defeat of the rebels ===
After capturing Zhifu, Zhang's soldiers hoisted the old republican flag over the city. According to historian Philip S. Jowett, this flag was often used as "symbol of the good old days of warlord China".

In early March, the warlord alliance and Liu agreed to a five-day ceasefire during which the rebels attempted to bribe Liu to defect back to them. They offered him 100,000 yuan, but Liu "thought his loyalty was worth at least 500,000 yuan". Zhang and his allies did not meet this price, however, and Liu remained on the government side. As no agreement was forthcoming, both Zhang and Liu gathered more troops, and with the truce over, the rebels again marched on Zhifu. They besieged the city, and were soon reinforced by opportunistic bandits and another warlord, Sun Dianying, who brought 7,000 fresh soldiers with him. Eventually, the city's defenders were betrayed by their own comrades: One of Liu's regiments under Colonel Liang defected to the rebels, allowing them to capture the city on 27 March. Nevertheless, the NRA troops managed to retreat in good order and with most of their ammunition eastward. Zhang used his victory and conquest of more territory to impose heavy taxes on the local population. Initially, the warlord forces behaviour was relatively disciplined, but on 6 April "they ran amok" in Zhifu, starting a six-day long crime spree of killing, looting and raping. Eventually, the officers managed to regain control over their men and put a stop to the "worst outrages", though at this point the city was largely destroyed. Meanwhile, the Japanese and Chinese governments signed an agreement on 28 March that resulted in the withdrawal of the Japanese military from Shandong. Fearing that Zhang might occupy the areas vacated by the Japanese, however, Chinese Minister of Foreign Affairs Wang Zhengting requested the Imperial Japanese Army to delay their withdrawal until the Nanjing government was in a position to secure Shandong.

Liu and some of his forces had managed to retreat from Zhifu to Muping, where the warlord army again put them under siege. Liu launched a first sally against the besiegers on 1 April, and reportedly managed to kill 2,000 enemy troops. Nevertheless, Zhang prepared to break the town's defenses, namely its medieval but strong walls, through an escalade. To relieve his besieging army, he forcibly conscripted civilians as gravediggers and coolies. As the siege progressed, Liu was eager to surrender, and was supported in this regard by Muping's chamber of commerce which hoped it could avoid the city's destruction through a peaceful solution. Confident of imminent victory, Zhang refused Liu's offer on 4 April. This time, however, the indiscipline and lust for plunder of his troops crippled Zhang's attempt to finally destroy Liu. Losing interest in fighting and preferring to loot the undefended countryside, many warlord soldiers deserted their posts, reducing the strength of Zhang's army. A final attempt to capture Muping was completely defeated on 22 April, and Zhang's army was routed. While Zhang was still surrounded by a number of loyal troops, his situation quickly deteriorated and Liu retook Zhifu in a counter-offensive on 23 April. Thereafter, any remaining unity among the warlords' army had collapsed; the rebels fled into the countryside, where they became little more than a number of "disorganised rabbles". The leaders of the insurgency simply attempted to escape the wrath of the government troops and civilian population.

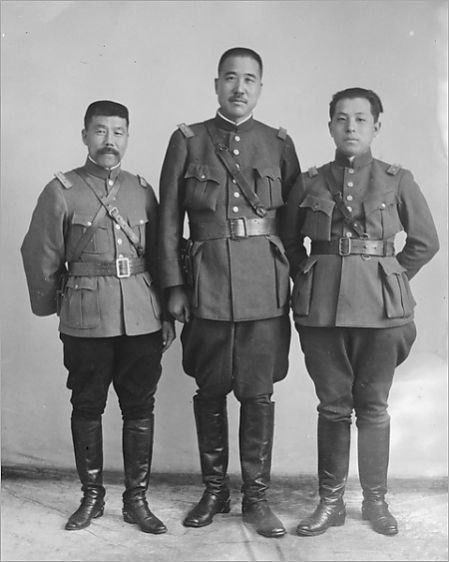
Chu Yupu (left) with Zhang Zongchang (middle) and the de facto ruler of Manchuria, Zhang Xueliang (right)

Zhang reportedly made "arrangements" with the Chinese government, and fled to Dalian on 23 April. The Japanese authorities of the Kwantung Leased Territory did not allow Zhang to enter Dalian, however, prompting him to travel to Moji-ku in Japan instead. On the other side, Chu Yupu and his remaining 1,000–4,500 loyal troops fled to the town of Fushan, whose 20,000 inhabitants they took hostage. The following 13-day siege by Nationalist forces was marked by atrocities at the hands of Chu's soldiers. Besides mass rapes and robberies, the defenders also tied 400 women and children to posts on the town walls in order to use them as human shields. Soldiers from both sides who were wounded in front of the city were left to die, as neither side allowed Red Cross workers to bring them to safety. According to some accounts, Liu and Chu eventually allowed women and children to leave the city on the insistence of Christian missionaries. Jowett considered these accounts "doubtful", however, since "such compassion would be out of character" for either commander. Following negotiations organized by the United States consul of Zhifu, Chu surrendered Fushan to the NRA. Thereafter, many women and girls committed mass suicide by jumping into the town's wells because they did not want to bear the perceived "shame" of being a rape victim. Besides the civilian casualties of the siege, around 1,500 NRA soldiers and 2,000 rebels died in combat at Fushan; many surviving warlord soldiers were killed out of revenge after the town's capture. Fushan was also completely looted, first by the rebel forces and then by the NRA. Chu Yupu, however, was spared by the Nationalists and allowed to go into exile in Korea with $400,000 in silver currency and bars. Jowett assumes that he bribed his opponents for safe passage.

== Aftermath ==
With the warlord rebellion defeated, peace only returned temporarily to northeastern Shandong. Soon after the conflict, Liu Zhennian and another Nationalist general/warlord, Jen Ying-chi, fought a brutal two-day war over who had the greater authority in Shandong, which Liu won. As the warlord rebellion had worsened the famine and instability affecting Shandong, it also stimulated the mass emigration of people from Shandong into the safer and more prosperous Manchuria. Meanwhile, the Red Spears' uprising further escalated; by August 1929, the peasant rebels had taken control over much of northern Shandong's hinterland as well as Dengzhou. Having ignored the issue until then, Liu finally moved against the Red Spears in September and brutally crushed the insurgency in two months. Liu remained in power until he was ousted by Han Fuju in course of a bitter war in 1932. Unlike any of the previous warlord rulers of eastern Shandong, Han actually proved to be relatively capable and popular as civilian administrator.

Chu Yupu, on the other side, returned to Shandong soon after his exile to Korea, and was murdered. Accounts differ on how he died: According to some accounts, Liu Zhennian had him killed; others report that he was captured by vengeful peasants. These either buried him alive, or buried him up to his chin so that "black ants and the searing sun gave him the slow death he deserved". The head of the rebellion, Zhang Zongchang, continued to live a few more years in exile. He died in 1932, shot dead by the relative of an officer he had once executed.
