= Vegetarian (disambiguation) =

A vegetarian is a person who abstains from the consumption of meat.

Vegetarian may also refer to:

- Vegetarian cuisine
- Vegetarian diet (disambiguation)
- The Vegetarian, a South Korean novella
- Vegetarian (film), a 2010 South Korean film
- Operation Vegetarian, a 1942 British military plan

== See also ==
- Herbivore
- Veganism
