= Beijing Revolt =

Chinese army mutiny in 1929

- Part of the Nanjing decade and the spillover of the Warlord Rebellion in northeastern Shandong
| Date | 2 March 1929 |
| Location | Beiping (Beijing), Republic of China |
| Result | Government victory |

Belligerents
| Republic of China | Mutineers loyal to Zhang Zongchang |

Units involved
| National Revolutionary Army (NRA): Shanxi Army (forces loyal to Yan Xishan) | One NRA regiment of ex-Shandong Army troops |

Strength
| Unknown | 1,000 |

Casualties and losses
| Unknown | 2 killed, 35 wounded, all survivors captured |

The Beijing Revolt or Peking Revolt was an armed mutiny against the Chinese Nationalist government in Beijing (then also known as Peking or Beiping) on 2 March 1929. After the Northern Expedition's official end in 1928, many defeated warlord troops had been integrated into the National Revolutionary Army (NRA). However, one regiment that had previously served under warlord Zhang Zongchang remained loyal to its old commander and rebelled on his orders. Though the mutineers captured the Yonghe Temple and threw Beijing into chaos, their revolt was quickly suppressed.

== Background ==
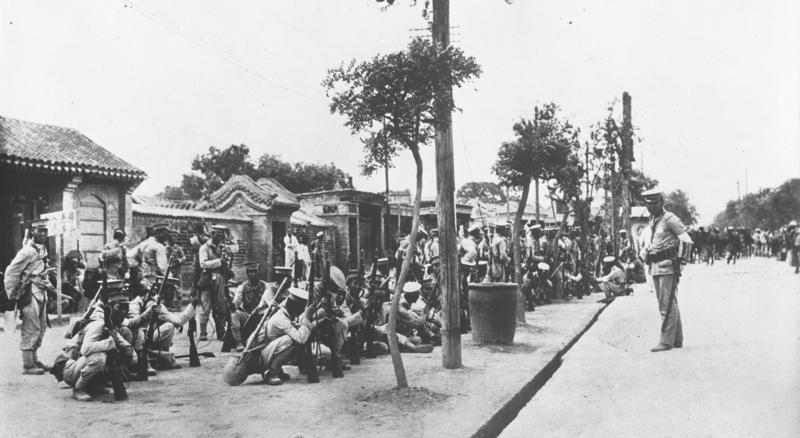
NRA soldiers in Beijing in 1931

Following a long period of internal chaos and civil war known as the Warlord Era, China was forcibly reunified in the Kuomintang-led Northern Expedition (1926–1928). A new Nationalist government was established in Nanjing, and the warlord armies that had been defeated during the expedition were either disbanded or absorbed into the National Revolutionary Army (NRA). This reunification was only superficially successful, however, as much of the country remained under the control of warlords who had joined the NRA during the Northern Expedition instead of resisting. Beijing and its surroundings were among the areas that were not truly controlled by the Nationalist government; instead, they were ruled by Shanxi warlord Yan Xishan. Furthermore, the warlords that had actually been ousted by the NRA continued to plot their return to power.

One of these was Zhang Zongchang, who launched a rebellion in his old fief of Shandong in January 1929. Though he primarily wanted to regain his former territories, Zhang also attempted to rally other warlords to launch a wider anti-Kuomintang movement in northern China. In this he was probably supported by Japan which provided him with ample funds to raise armies and bribe NRA troops to defect. In February 1929, Zhang claimed that a coalition of warlords, including himself, Chu Yupu, Yan Xishan, Wu Peifu, Bai Chongxi, Qi Xieyuan, and a number Manchurian military commanders were preparing for a massive campaign against the Nationalist government. No actual alliance was formed, however, and the "whole affair died down again, as suddenly as it had started". On the other side, many ordinary soldiers who had formerly been employed by Zhang found his offers highly attractive. Many members of Zhang's Shandong Army had been demobilized after the Northern Expedition and had fallen into poverty. Others had been able to join the NRA, but were not paid well, and thus were ready to defect to their old commander in return for financial rewards. One dissatisfied NRA regiment whose troops were of "northern origin" and had formerly been part of the Shandong Army, was stationed at the Yonghe Temple in Beijing. At some point, Zhang reportedly contacted this unit, and ordered them to prepare a revolt, which they did. It was later believed that this was part of his plot to regain power in northern China.

== Revolt ==
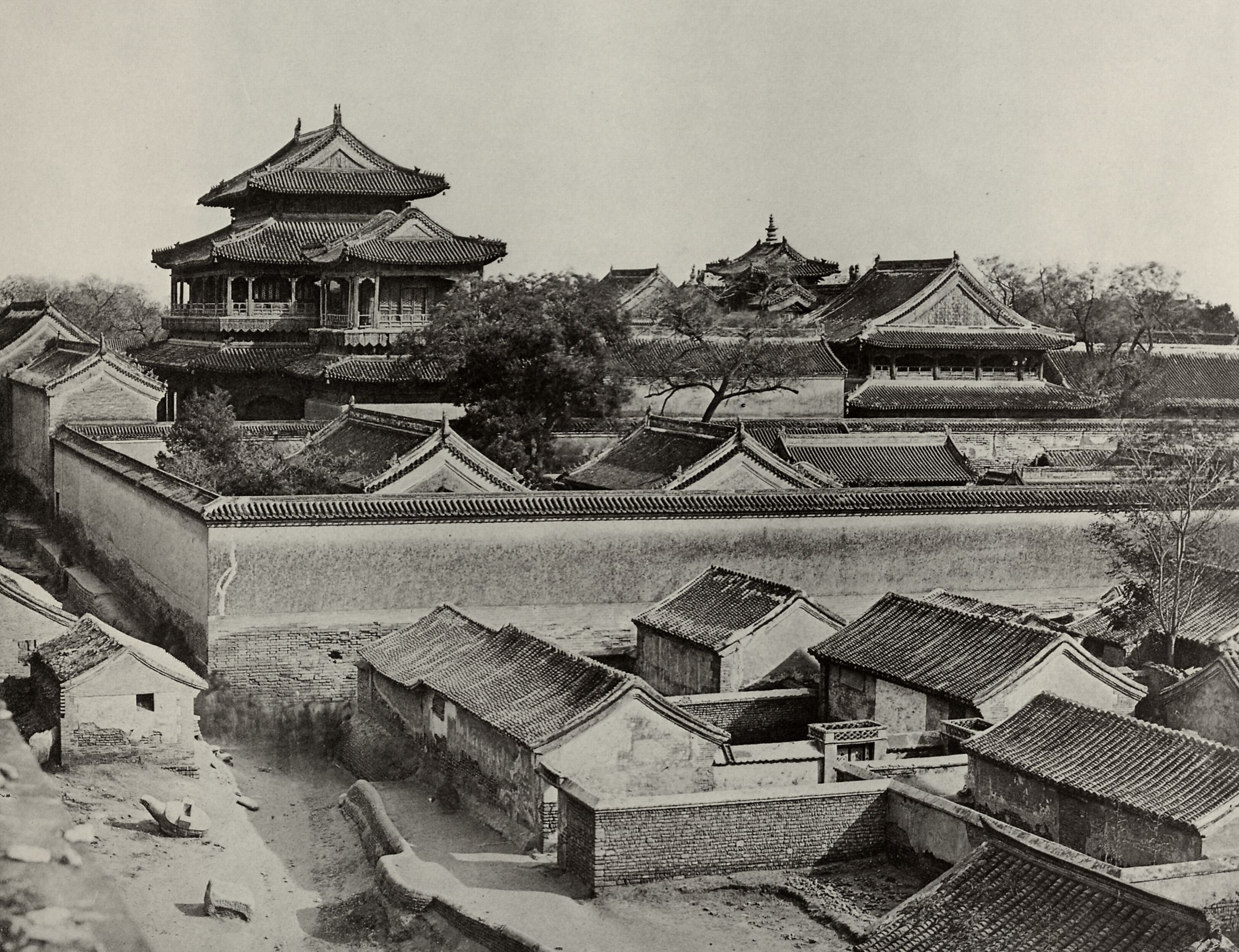
The Yonghe Temple (photo from 1860) which the mutineers used as base during the revolt

The revolt was launched on 2 March 1929, when 20 armed men in plain-clothes captured and disarmed the Shanxi Army guards of the Yonghe Temple. The men then fired in the air. This was the sign for the Zhang-loyal regiment to mutiny. The rebel soldiers quickly manned the temple's walls, barricaded themselves, and then also took control of the nearby city fortifications. From this cover they started to shoot at the civilians on the streets, causing great panic among the locals. Business and traffic in western Beijing were brought to a standstill. The government authorities reacted quickly upon being informed of the revolt, and sent loyal troops to quell the uprising.

These loyalists surrounded and isolated the mutineers at the Yonghe Temple, and forced them to surrender after a short fight. Though the number of casualties among the civilians and loyalists remained unclear, two mutineers were killed and 35 wounded. The NRA cordoned the area around the temple, and managed to capture all surviving rebels. Having disarmed it, the mutinous regiment was imprisoned at the former Winter Palace.

== Aftermath ==
The revolt received international attention, with newspapers in Australia, the Straits Settlements, and United States reporting on it, and commending the local authorities for having acted so quickly and decisively in quelling the uprising. The Chinese government declared martial law in Beijing after the revolt, and took "precautions" to keep control of the other ex-Shandong Army troops in the NRA.

Zhang Zongchang's rebellion in Shandong continued until May 1929, but was defeated by loyalist NRA forces. Thereafter, Zhang's career was finished as a military leader and political strongman. After a few years in exile, he returned to Shandong in 1932 and was promptly murdered.
