= HMS Boxer =

Several ships of the British Royal Navy have been named HMS Boxer, named after the competitor in a boxing match.

- HMS Boxer (1797) was an Acute-class gun-brig launched in 1797 and sold in 1809.
- HMS Boxer (1812) was a Bold-class gun-brig launched in 1812 that the United States Navy captured in 1813 during the War of 1812.
- There was a Boxer that on 8 April 1814 participated in boat service that resulted in the destruction of 27 vessels and a quantity of stores up the Connecticut River and for which the Royal Navy issued a clasp to the Naval General Service Medal. However, this was a typo, as the vessel present was the Borer.
- HMS Boxer (1837) was a paddle steamer formerly called Ivanhoe bought by the Royal Navy in 1837 and sold in 1841.
- HMS Boxer (1846) was to have been a Teazer-class gunvessel. Construction was started in 1846 but she was cancelled before being completed.
- HMS Boxer (1855) was a Dapper-class gunboat which was launched in 1855 and broken up at Malta in 1865.
- HMS Boxer (1868) was a Beacon-class gunvessel launched in 1868 and sold for scrap in 1887.
- HMS Boxer (1894) was an Ardent-class destroyer launched in 1894 and sunk in a collision with SS St Patrick on 8 February 1918.
- HMS Boxer (F121) was an LST that served during the Allied invasion of Italy in World War II. The vessel was later used as a fighter direction ship and after the war, a radar training vessel.
- HMS Boxer (F92) was a Type 22 frigate, launched in 1981, paid off in 1999 and sunk as a target in August 2004.

== Battle honours ==
Ships named Boxer have earned the following battle honours:

- Crimea, 1855
- Sicily, 1943
- Salerno, 1944
- Anzio, 1944

== See also ==
- USS Boxer
