= Sui County =

Sui County may refer to the following locations in China:

- Sui County, Henan (睢县), of Shangqiu Prefecture, Henan
- Sui County, Hubei (随县), of Suizhou Prefecture, Hubei
- Suizhou, formerly named Sui County (随县), prefecture-level city of Hubei
