= Qi County =

Qi County, or Qixian, may refer to three counties in the People's Republic of China:

- Qi County, Kaifeng (杞县), Henan
- Qi County, Hebi (淇县), Henan
- Qi County, Shanxi (祁县)

== See also ==
- Qi (disambiguation)
