= Boxer (surname) =

Boxer is a surname. Notable people with the surname include:

- Alan Boxer (1916–1998), Air Vice-Marshal of the Royal Air Force
- Amanda Boxer (born 1948), British actress
- Barbara Boxer (born 1940), American senator
- C. R. Boxer (1904–2000), British historian
- Christina Boxer (born 1957), English middle-distance runner
- Edward Boxer (1784–1855), British naval officer
- Edward Mounier Boxer (1822–1898), British inventor and army officer
- Herb Boxer (born 1947), former American ice-hockey player
- John Boxer (Australian actor) (born 1959)
- John Boxer (British actor) (1909–1982)
- Linda M. Boxer, American hematologist and academic administrator
- Mark Boxer (1931–1988), British magazine editor
- Matthew Boxer, New Jersey State Comptroller
- Stephen Boxer (born 1948), British actor
- Steven G. Boxer, American chemist
