= Suining (disambiguation) =

Suining (遂宁市) is a prefecture-level city in Sichuan, China.

Suining may also refer to:

- Suining County, Jiangsu (睢宁县), county under the jurisdiction of Xuzhou, Jiangsu
- Suining County, Hunan (绥宁县), county under the jurisdiction of Shaoyang, Hunan
- Suining, Jiaozhi (绥宁), a former district of Songping in Chinese Vietnam
