= Boxing (disambiguation) =

Boxing is a combat sport, also known as "western boxing".

Boxing may also refer to:

== Combat sports ==
- Amateur boxing
- Lethwei or Burmese boxing, a Burmese martial art
- Muay Thai or Thai boxing, a Thai martial art
- Kickboxing, a family of combat sport styles that allows various strikes while forbidding ground grappling
- Savate or French boxing, a French martial art
- Sanda or Chinese boxing, a Chinese martial art
- Musti-yuddha or Indian boxing, an Indian martial art
- Chess boxing, a hybrid sport mixing elements from chess and boxing

== Video games ==
- Boxing (1980 video game), an Atari 2600 video game
- Boxing (1981 video game), an Intellivision video game
- Boxing (1990 video game), a Game Boy video game

== Music ==
- "Boxing", 1995 song from the Ben Folds Five (album)
- "Boxing", 2023 song by Mount Kimbie from the album The Sunset Violent

== Other ==
- Boxing (computer programming), a process of placing a primitive type within an object so the primitive can be used as an object
- Boxing County, in Shandong, China
- Boxing Day, a holiday
- Boxing the compass, the act of naming all thirty-two points of the compass
- Boxing, the act of packing an item into a box

== See also ==
- Boxer (disambiguation)
- Pugilism (disambiguation)
