= The Boxers (sculpture) =

Sculpture by Keith Haring in Berlin, Germany

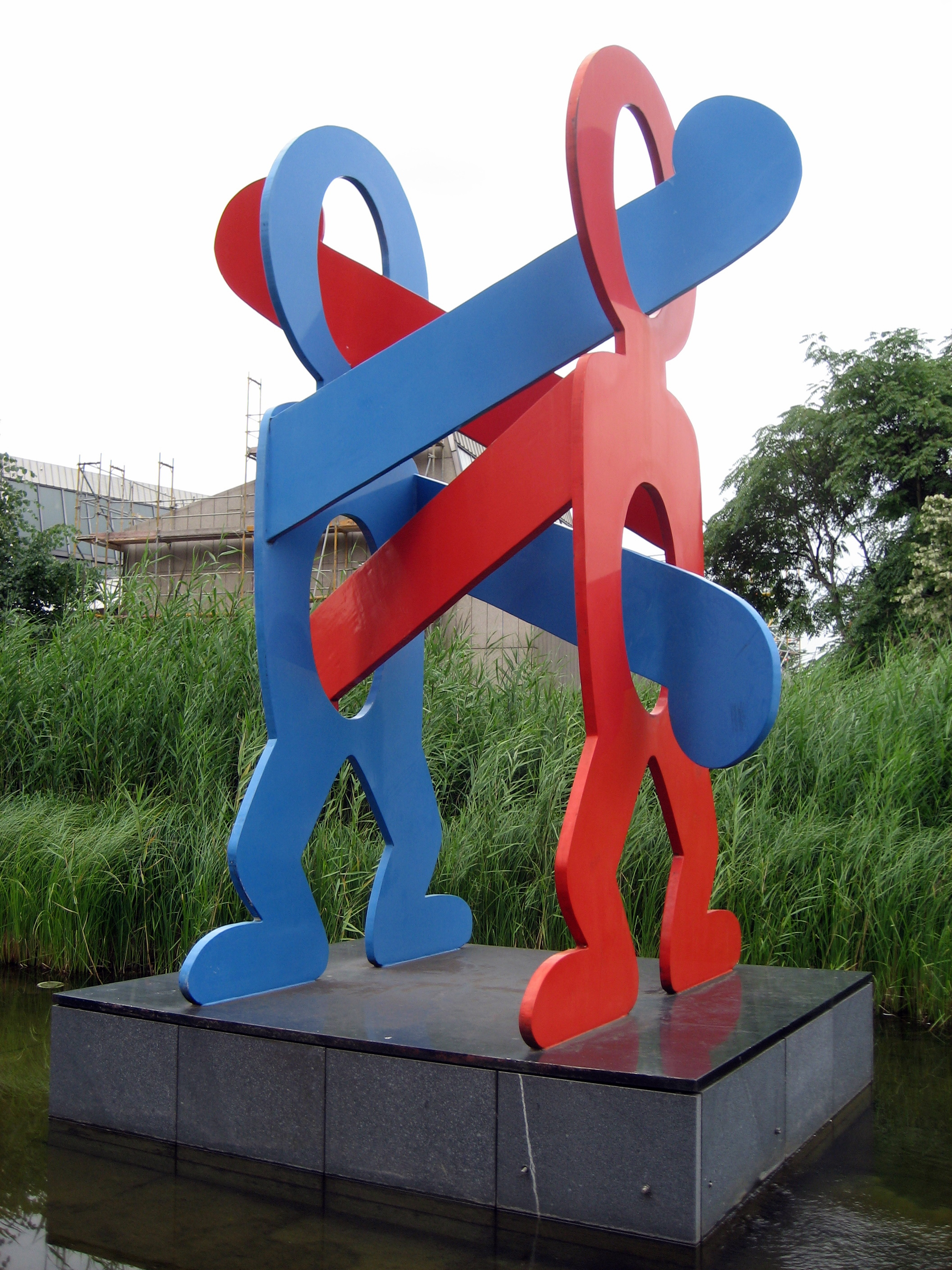
- The sculpture in 2008
- Artist: Keith Haring
- Year: 1987
- Location: Berlin, Germany
- 52.508767°N 13.371814°E

The Boxers is an outdoor 1987 steel and lacquer sculpture by Keith Haring, installed in Berlin, Germany. The sculpture shows simplified humanoid figures, one red and one blue, with holes in the head and stomach. The arms are set up to be through the holes, giving the impression that the holes were punched out by the other figure.

== See also ==
- 1987 in art
