= Pugilism =

Pugilism or Pugilist may refer to:

- Boxing, a combat sport and martial art
  - Ancient Greek boxing
  - Bare-knuckle boxing, boxing without the use of boxing gloves
  - Russian boxing, Russian bare-knuckle boxing
- The Pugilist, a 2021 album by the BBB Featuring Bernie Dresel

== See also ==
- Boxing (disambiguation)
