= USS Boxer =

USS Boxer may refer to:

- USS Boxer (1815), was a 14-gun brig constructed by C. and D. Churchill of Middletown, Connecticut, and commissioned in 1815 under Lt. John Porter.
- USS Boxer (1831), was a 10-gun schooner commissioned in 1832.
- USS Boxer (1865), was originally the blockade runner Tristram Shandy, captured during the Civil War on 15 May 1864.
- USS Boxer (1905), was a training brigantine commissioned on 11 May 1905.
- USS Boxer (CV-21), was an aircraft carrier launched on 14 December 1944 and commissioned on 16 April 1945.
- USS Boxer (LHD-4), is an amphibious assault ship commissioned on 11 February 1995 and currently on active duty.
