= Vegetarian diet =

Vegetarian diet may refer to:

- Vegetarianism
- Vegetarian cuisine
- Plant-based diet (i.e., not necessarily stemming from vegetarian beliefs)
- Veganism
