= Liu Zhennian =

Chinese military commander (1898–1935)

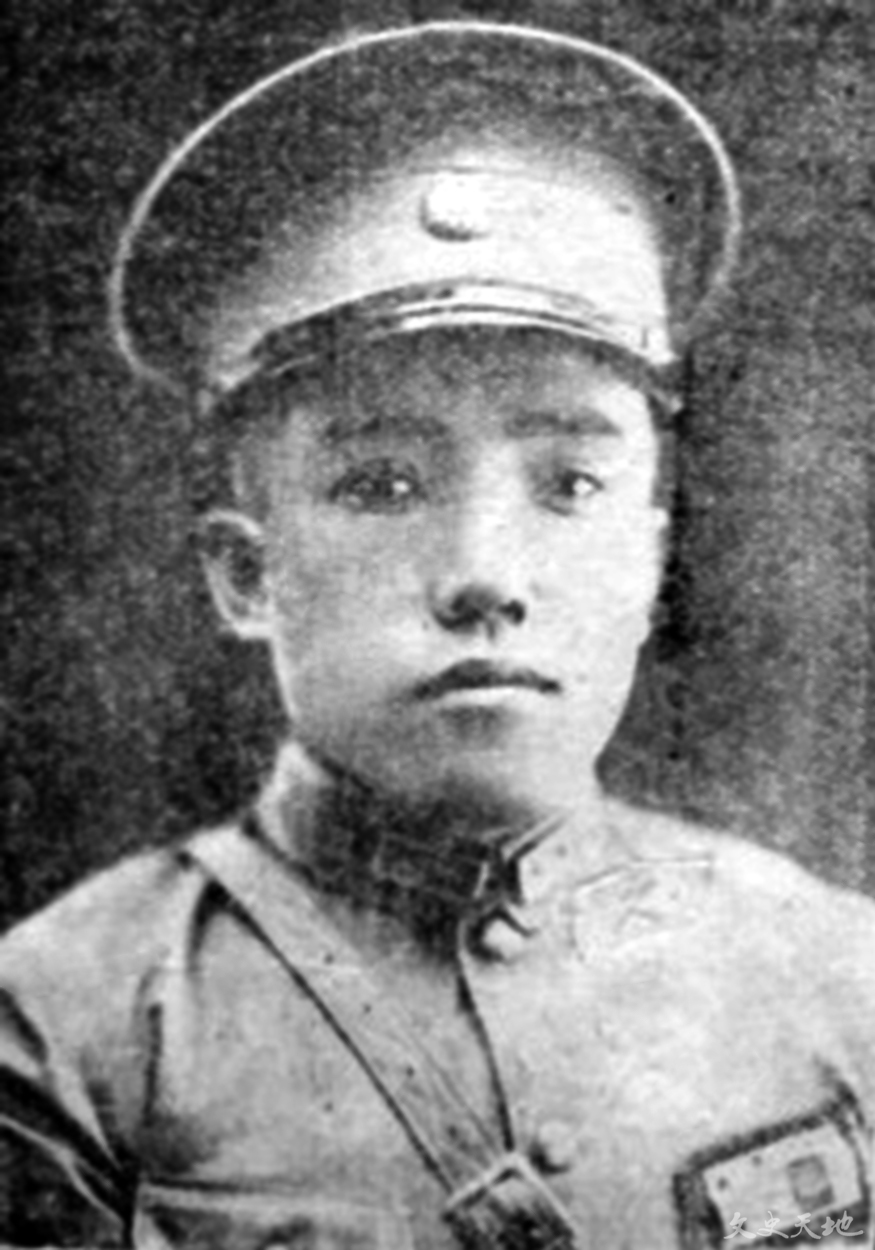
Liu Zhennian

Liu Zhennian (Chinese: 刘珍年; pinyin: Líu Zhēnnián; 1898 in Nangong, Hebei, China – 13 May 1935) was a Chinese military commander during the Warlord Era and Nanjing decade in the history of the Republic of China.

Liu graduated from the Baoding Military Academy and served as a regimental and brigade commander under the warlords Li Jinglin, Chu Yupu, and Zhang Zongchang. After the defeat of Zhang Zongchang, Liu switched sides and his forces were absorbed by the Kuomintang. He captured and killed his former patron Chu Yupu on 4 September 1929. Subsequently, Liu was appointed commander of the 21st Division in 1930.

Having eastern Shandong as his defense area, he became known as the "King of Shandong East" and was unpopular for levying heavy taxes. In autumn 1932, he was attacked and evicted from Shandong by its governor Han Fuju because Liu had refused to obey his orders. After his defeat, Nanjing transferred him and his 21st Division south to Wenzhou, Zhejiang Province at the end of 1932. There his troops, removed from their familiar surroundings, suffered from sickness and became mutinous. Despite his appeal to Chiang Kai-shek in January 1933, his Division was sent to participate in the Fourth Encirclement Campaign against Jiangxi Soviet in Jiangxi Province. He soon resigned from the army, but was arrested in May by Lu Diping for disobeying Chiang's order to attack the Chinese Red Army and was executed as a consequence in 1935.
