= Zhang Zongchang =

20th-century Chinese warlord

Zhang Zongchang 張宗昌
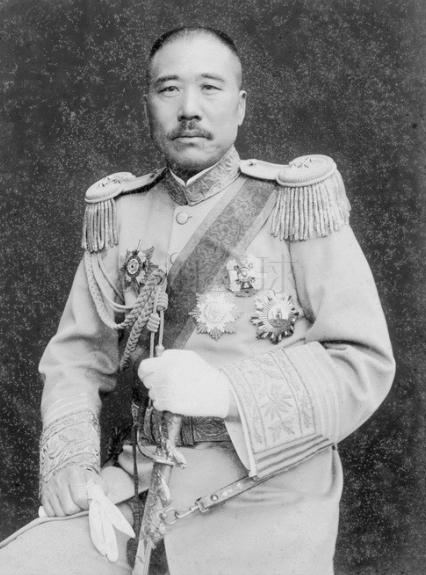
- Zhang in the 1920s
- Born: 1881; Ye County, Lai Prefecture, Shandong, Qing China
- Died: 3 September 1932 (aged 50–51); Jinan, Shandong, Republic of China
- Military career
- Allegiance: Russian Empire; Qing dynasty; (Republic of China (1912–1949)) Fengtian clique; (Republic of China (1912–1949)) National Pacification Army
- Rank: General
- Nicknames: "Dogmeat General"; "72-Cannon Chang"; "The Three Don't-Knows"; "General Eighty-Six"
- Commands: Green Standard Army; Shandong Army; Shandong–Zhili Army
- Conflicts: Russo-Japanese War; Xinhai Revolution; Second Revolution; Warlord Era; Second Zhili–Fengtian War; Northern Expedition; Warlord Rebellion in northeastern Shandong

Zhang Zongchang
- Traditional Chinese: 張宗昌
- Simplified Chinese: 张宗昌
Transcriptions
Standard Mandarin
- Hanyu Pinyin: Zhāng Zōngchāng
- Wade–Giles: Chang^{1} Tsung^{1}-chʻang^{1}
- IPA: [ʈʂáŋ.tsʊ́ŋ.ʈʂʰáŋ]

Courtesy name
- Chinese: 效坤
Transcriptions
Standard Mandarin
- Hanyu Pinyin: Xiàokūn
- Wade–Giles: Hsiao^{4}-kʻun^{1}
- IPA: [ɕjâʊ.kʰwə́n]

Zhang Zongchang (Chinese: 張宗昌; pinyin: Zhāng Zōngchāng; also romanized as Chang Tsung-chang; 1881 – 3 September 1932), courtesy name Xiaokun, was a Chinese warlord who ruled Shandong from 1925 to 1928. A member of the Fengtian clique, Zhang was notorious for his brutal and ruthless behavior, eccentric personality, and extravagant lifestyle, which earned him nicknames such as the "Dogmeat General". In 1927, Time dubbed him China's "basest warlord".

Zhang's troops were defeated by the National Revolutionary Army during the Northern Expedition in 1928, and he fled to Japan before returning to Shandong in 1932, where he was assassinated by a young officer.

== Biography ==
=== Early life and career ===
Zhang was born in 1881 in Ye County (掖縣, now Laizhou city) in Shandong. His family was poor. Zhang's father worked as a head shaver and trumpeter, and was an alcoholic. His mother was an exorcist and "practicing witch". His parents eventually separated. Zhang stayed with his mother who had taken a new lover. In his teens, Zhang's family moved to Manchuria (which was known as Chuang Guandong at that time), where Zhang became involved in petty crime in Harbin. He successively worked as a pickpocket, bouncer, and prospector. At some point, he worked in Siberia, learning Russian. Zhang eventually became a bandit in the Chinese countryside, though he served as auxiliary for the Imperial Russian Army during the Russo-Japanese War in 1904–1905. Following the conflict, he returned to crime and rose to lead his own bandit gang.

His activities during the Xinhai Revolution of 1911 are unclear, though he reportedly led a group of "revolutionary desperados" at the time. At first, he ended up in Jiangsu, where he joined a Green Standard Army regiment. He impressed his commanding officer Cheng Dechuan so much that he appointed Zhang his successor. Afterwards, Zhang and his regiment operated under Division Commander Leng Yuqin, battling bandit groups. When the Second Revolution broke out in 1913, Leng sided with the revolutionaries and was killed, resulting in Zhang becoming the division's commander. However, the division's connection with the revolutionaries caused General Feng Guozhang to disband the entire unit, reducing Zhang to a merely symbolic role. He responded by murdering the revolutionary Chen Qimei in Shanghai in 1916, proving himself loyal and reliable to Feng. When the latter became Vice President of the Republic of China, he appointed Zhang the commander of his personal guard.

Zhang returned to Manchuria in 1922, and joined the Fengtian clique of warlord Zhang Zuolin. He made a good impression, with one story being that he rose in popularity one year at Zhang Zuolin's birthday party: in contrast to other guests who showered the warlord with expensive gifts, Zhang Zongchang sent him two empty coolie baskets and failed to turn up himself. Zhang Zuolin was baffled until the purpose of the gift was ascertained: Zhang Zongchang's empty basket implied he was a man willing to shoulder whatever heavy responsibilities the warlord entrusted him with. He was subsequently rewarded with a command position in his army, though only after proving himself in battle did Zhang Zongchang visit his superior in person.

Zhang Zongchang proved to be one of the more capable warlord generals, making effective use of armored trains. Aided by his knowledge of the Russian language, he recruited thousands of White Russian refugees from the Russian Civil War; he organized the men into specialized units, including a unit of Cossack bodyguards, and crews for his armored trains. He was also one of the first Chinese generals to incorporate women into the military on a large scale, including using a regiment of nurses consisting entirely of White Russian women. They trained their Chinese counterparts, resulting in greater efficiency in taking care of Zhang's wounded troops, a significant boost for morale and combat capability. He also organized his own small air force, including at least one Caudron C.59 bomber.

=== Rise to prominence and rule of Shandong ===
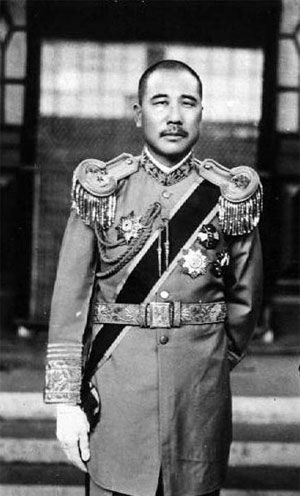
Zhang in the 1920s

In 1924, he took part in the Second Zhili–Fengtian War, capturing the crucial Lengkouguan Pass after the Zhili clique's defenses were thrown into chaos due to Feng Yuxiang's betrayal. This boosted Zhang's reputation within the Fengtian clique. He later helped partition Shanghai between the opposing forces. In April 1925 he conquered Shanghai proper and then seized Nanjing, both for the glory of Zhang Zuolin's Fengtian clique. From then on, Zhang was very active in Shanghai for both work and pleasure. He often caroused in the city with Zhang Zuolin's son, Gen. Zhang Xueliang. Shanghai was a key site in the smuggling of opium and the Fengtian economy found itself increasingly reliant on the drug trade, with which Zhang became closely connected. Later in 1925, Zhang and his forces were ousted from Shanghai. He was subsequently appointed military governor of Shandong, which he ruled as warlord until May 1928.

Zhang's rule of Shandong was notoriously poor, dominated by graft and mismanagement. He implemented excessive taxes, printed so much provincial currency that it became worthless, and starved public institutions of funds. By 1927, the provincial educational system had collapsed and the local economy was in tatters. Any opposition was brutally suppressed; when a newspaper criticized his regime, Zhang promptly ordered its editor shot. Peasants banded together as part of the Red Spear Society, revolting against Zhang's reign in the countryside. Although poorly armed, these insurgents proved to be a major threat to smaller units belonging to Zhang's army. At the same time, Zhang set up his headquarters in Jinan like a "medieval court" with lavish entertainment and grand feasts. He also acted as benefactor for artists, writers, entertainers, arms dealers, drug kingpins, diplomats, and Western journalists.

When the National Revolutionary Army (NRA) loyal to the Kuomintang (KMT) launched the Northern Expedition, Zhang remained firmly loyal to the Fengtian clique, briefly retaking Shanghai before his army was driven north. As his position in Shandong was threatened to be overrun, Zhang requested a resident German technician named Franz Oster to build more aircraft for his air force to counter the advancing KMT. Oster constructed a plane, but when it was shipped to Zhang's headquarters, it was found to be so badly designed that it could not even get off the ground. In 1928, NRA troops led by Bai Chongxi defeated and destroyed Zhang Zongchang's army, capturing 20,000 of his 50,000 troops and almost capturing Zhang himself, who escaped beyond the Great Wall to Manchuria. Regardless, he and the remnants of his army were able to escape northward with much loot from Shandong. The province was left in chaos following his flight. Even after the loss of Shandong and the murder of Fengtian leader Zhang Zuolin, Zhang Zongchang wanted to resist the NRA. When the succeeding Fengtian commander Zhang Xueliang (son of the former murdered leader Zhang Zuolin) intended to make peace with the KMT, Zhang and his follower Chu Yupu revolted and attempted to overthrow him. However, the combined NRA-Zhang Xueliang forces crushed Zhang Zongchang's army. In the end, even his Russian mercenaries betrayed him.

=== Exile activities ===
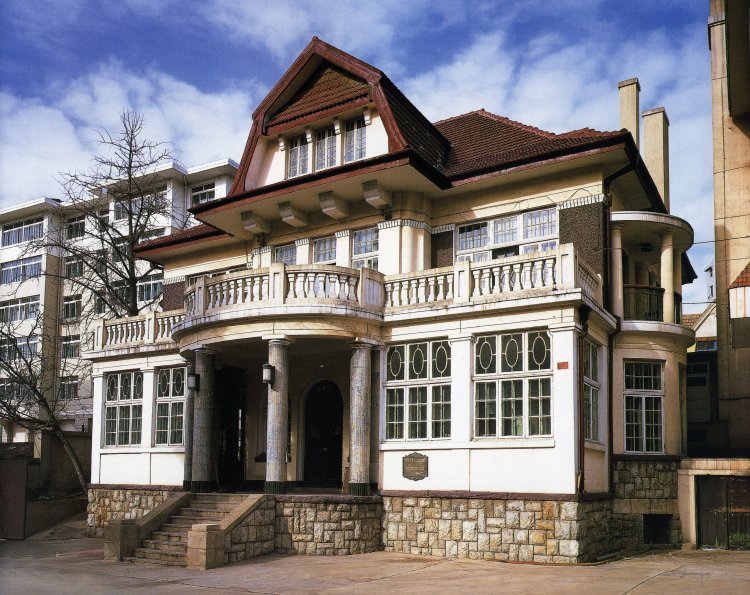
Zhang's apartment when he was in exile in Dalian (then Kwantung Leased Territory)

As his army disintegrated, Zhang fled to Japanese protection in Dalian, though remained unwilling to accept his reduced status. From Dalian, he hatched several plots to regain his former territories. Possibly enjoying covert support by Japan, Zhang, his long-time follower Chu Yupu and another warlord, Huang Feng-chi, returned to Shandong in 1929 and launched a major rebellion against Liu Zhennian, the Nationalist-aligned de facto ruler of eastern Shandong at the time. Gathering tens of thousands of demobilized soldiers who were still loyal to them, the three warlords fought for several months against Liu's followers, thereby causing great destruction and many casualties among the civilian population. Zhang also instigated a parallel revolt in Beijing that was quickly suppressed. In the end, the Shandong rebellion was defeated, but Zhang managed to escape back to Dalian. This time, the Japanese authorities of the Kwantung Leased Territory did not allow Zhang to reenter Dalian. As a result, he travelled to Moji in Japan instead.

Later that year, he was living quietly in Beppu, Japan, with his mother, though he was thrown into the spotlight again when he "accidentally" shot Prince Xiankai (憲開), a cousin of the deposed emperor Puyi. According to Zhang the gun he was holding while standing at his hotel window happened to go off and shot the young prince in the back, killing him instantly, though it was more likely he killed the playboy prince for dallying with one of Zhang's many concubines. He was charged, found guilty by a Japanese court and given the choice between 15 days' imprisonment or a $150 (US) fine. He chose the fine.

=== Assassination ===
After the Mukden Incident, the Japanese government arranged Zhang's return to China in agreement that he would use his connections to recruit remnants of the Beiyang Army for them. Instead, upon arrival, Zhang declared his intention to assist the Chinese resistance against the Japanese invasion of Manchuria, meeting with the new military governor of Shandong, Han Fuju. On 3 September 1932, Zhang visited some old comrades in Jinan, including a banquet hosted by Shi Yousan at Han's residence, where he gifted his pistol to Shi after he repeatedly complimented it. When he returned to the city's railway station to travel to Beijing at around 6 p.m., Zhang was fatally shot by Zheng Jicheng. Zheng Jicheng was the nephew of Zheng Jinsheng, an officer of warlord Feng Yuxiang's "Five Tiger Generals", whom Zhang had captured and executed on 6 November 1928, during a losing battle on a stretch of the Longhai railway. Zhang's last words were reportedly "No good!" Zheng, after peacefully surrendering to the authorities, was kept imprisoned for seven months before being granted clemency and receiving a full pardon by the Kuomintang government in 1933.

Contemporary claims were made that the "filial murder" might have been part of a plan set up by Han to remove Zhang with assistance from Shi, who might have aimed to leave Zhang defenseless by flattering him into handing over his means of self-protection, as a potential political rival, combined with the fact that Han was a personal friend of Zheng Jinsheng during the Warlord Era. At Han's house, Zhang had actually been inadvertently seated in direct line of sight with a photo of Zheng Jinsheng and was briefly believed to have suspected ulterior motives when his expression changed drastically during the banquet, only to instead take note that exactly thirteen people were in the room. It was also suspected that Feng, who was the brother-in-law to Zheng Jinsheng, was involved in the murder.

=== Legacy ===
Zhang was buried in the Western Hills near Beijing. His funeral attracted family members, ex-retainers, paid mourners, and "the curious"; the funeral procession stretched for 2 miles (3.2 km). After his death, a shop clerk named Liang Zuoyou claimed to have found a $30 million check belonging to the Nanjing government on Zhang's body. Finance Minister T. V. Soong provided Liang with a first-class train ticket to personally return the check to the state treasury in Nanjing. However, Liang had "misread" the number, as the check was only worth $300,000. The government was ridiculed by the press for the event, while the clerk greatly profited, as he had exchanged the first-class ticket for a third-class one and pocketed the difference.

As a result of rumors of his great wealth, Zhang's tomb was repeatedly targeted and raided by grave robbers. It was also opened by Red Guards during the Cultural Revolution, but the communists found only a single tablet. In modern China, Zhang is still mainly remembered as a "wicked warlord" representing the violent excesses of his era.

== Personal life ==
=== Nicknames and titles ===
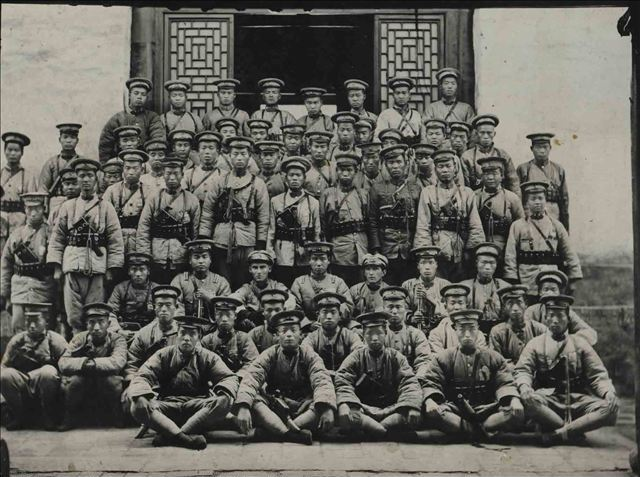
Zhang's bodyguards in Jinan

In course of his career, Zhang gained a great number of nicknames, most of them derogatory:

- "Dogmeat General" (狗肉將軍; Gǒuròu Jiāngjūn): The name was based on his preference for a Chinese brand of tonic known as "dogmeat", or from his addiction to the high stakes gambling game pai gow, popularly known as "eating dog meat."
- "Monster"
- "Lanky General"
- "Old Eighty-Six": The origin of this nickname is unclear. According to rumour it either referred to his height or to the length of his penis, which was said to measure up to a pile of 86 Mexican silver dollars when erect. (Note: With the 1920—1945 issue, this works out to 20.64 centimetres (8.13 in), with the 1910—1914 100th Anniversary issue, this works out to 22.36 centimetres (8.80 in), and with the 1898—1909 issue, this works out to 24.08 centimetres (9.48 in), albeit it is likely that the claimed measurement may have been conducted with silver dollars of varying types.) Mexican silver dollars were a common currency in China at the time.
- "Three Don't Knows" (三不知; Sānbùzhī): Based on Zhang's alleged lack of knowledge about how much money he had, how many soldiers he had, and how many women were in his harem.
- "72-Cannon Chang": This nickname might also have been connected to the alleged length of his penis.
- "Chang of Shantung" by the foreign press
- "Great General of Justice and Might": a title he awarded to himself.
- "The General with three long legs" by Shanghai's prostitutes in reference to his penis' length.

=== Character and public image ===
You tell me to do this,
He tells me to do that.
You're all bastards,
Go fuck your mother.

— "Poem about bastards" credited to Zhang Zongchang (Note: In the original, this reads: 你叫我去這樣幹，他叫我去那樣幹。真是一群大混蛋，全都混你媽的蛋。)

Zhang Zongchang was one of the most infamous and well-known Chinese warlords, and it is difficult to differentiate truth from slander and legends in regards to his life. Being of impressive height (Note: He was either 6 feet 6 inches (1.98 m) or 7 feet (2.1 m) tall.) and physically strong, he was often regarded as a brute and loathed by his victims. According to researchers Matthew R. Portwood and John P. Dunn, his opponents portrayed him as "a poster boy for evil and avarice". Historian Arthur Waldron stated that of all warlords of the time, Zhang is "perhaps the one most generally held in contempt". His opponents stated that his behaviour was "mindlessly brutal" during his military campaigns and that he had "the physique of an elephant, the brain of a pig and the temperament of a tiger". Writer Lin Yutang called Zhang "the most colorful, legendary, medieval, and unashamed ruler of modern China". Time magazine called him "notorious, cruel, rapacious". Zhang was notorious for his hobby of splitting the skulls of prisoners with his sword, and for hanging dissidents from telephone poles. Despite his negative reputation, however, Zhang was also known to be very sociable, charming and commanded the respect of his troops as well as superiors. He was described as being very brave, and as a "warmonger". Waldron argued that Zhang was one of the most talented military leaders among the Chinese warlords, something his critics refused to acknowledge.

Zhang loved to boast about the size of his penis, which became part of his legend. He was a "well-known womanizer" and polygamist. At the height of his power, he had some 30 to 50 concubines of different nationalities, who were given numbers since he could not remember their names nor speak their language. According to Time, several of his concubines had been forcibly seized from rich families in Shandong. However, some of his concubines stayed with him throughout his career, with him marrying the earliest when he was still a coolie. His concubines included Chinese, Japanese, Russians, Koreans, Mongolians and at least one American. According to research by journalist John Gunther, his harem included concubines of 26 different nationalities. Zhang reportedly ate meat of black Chow Chow dogs every day, as it was popularly believed at the time that this meat would boost a man's virility. He was free with his gifts, lavishly squandering money and concubines on superiors and friends. As a result, his commanders were very loyal to him, contributing to his military success. However, his common soldiers were often not well paid, negatively impacting their morale. He often ventured to Beijing to meet with China's high society and go gambling. He repeatedly met and played poker with Oei Hui-lan, a socialite and wife of Chinese statesman Wellington Koo. She later argued that Zhang proved to be a complex character: On one side, he was "so delightfully outrageous that he was disarming", such as when he regularly gambled away tens of thousands of dollars and behaved like a swashbuckler; yet he was also highly respectful and friendly towards those whom he respected including Oei. Zhang also funded actress Yang Naimei, helping her to set up the Naimei Film Company in Shanghai. He made a pact of brotherhood with the Japanese rōnin Date Junnosuke in 1929, which led Date to change his name to Zhang Zongyuan and change his nationality to Chinese.

Although only semi-literate, Zhang Zongchang was also known for writing poetry, though his works (such as the "Poem about bastards", the "Daming Lake poem", "Visiting Penglai Pavilion", and "Pray for Rain") are generally considered to be quite bad. However, according to Zhang's fourth daughter Zhang Chunsui, Zhang was not in the habit of writing poems. Some sources have also disputed these poems as being fabrications made by his political opponent Han Fuju to slander him. When asked about where he got his education, Zhang liked to say that he went to the 'College of the Green Forest,' a common euphemism for banditry at the time.

From afar, Mount Tai looks blackish,
Narrow on top and wide at the bottom.
If you flipped it upside down,
It would be narrow at the bottom and wide on top.

— "Visiting Mount Tai" credited to Zhang Zongchang (Note: In the original, this reads:《游泰山》：遠看泰山黑糊糊，上頭細來下頭粗。如把泰山倒過來，下頭細來上頭粗。)

Though not very pious, Zhang was strongly influenced by a Daoist diviner, Tong Huagu, who had allegedly convinced the warlord of his powers by successfully prophesying that a train would derail. It was rumoured that the diviner had ensured this outcome by bribing some peasants to sabotage the tracks. In summer 1927, a famine struck Shandong particularly hard, and Zhang Zongchang was reported to have gone into a temple of the Dragon King to pray for rain. When this failed to improve the situation, Zhang returned to the temple. In his fury, he slapped the Dragon King's statue several times, and ordered his artillery to shoot into the sky for several hours. He also intended to build a shrine devoted to himself, including a large bronze statue, at Daming Lake. The project was not finished before Zhang's flight from Shandong.

While having a reputation as one of the most brutal and ruthless warlords, he was also one of the most colourful. After defeating the army of general Wu Peifu by making his enemy's forces defect, he rewarded the defectors by allowing them to keep their original ranks. He then promoted his own officers, but since there was not enough metal to make the gold and silver stars for their rank insignia, he ordered the stars to be made from the gold and silver paper foil in cigarette packages. During the mass promotion ceremony, the officers were surprised to find their insignia already torn even before the ceremony had ended. He usually travelled with a coffin planted atop a car during his campaigns; this was a typical way at the time to signify one's willingness to die in combat. At times, Zhang would sit in the coffin during his travels and smoke a cigar; he was famous for his consumption of large Cuban cigars. Zhang publicly announced that he would come home in his coffin if he was defeated in battle. When his troops were forced back during one campaign he was true to his word—he was paraded through the streets, sitting in his coffin and waving to the cheering crowd. It was also a matter of public amusement that he kept his aged mother with him at all times. Even on campaign he often kept her close, providing her with a well-appointed railway car to accompany his army. He also raised a well-armed army of thousands of teenage soldiers for his son to command.
