= List of Whittier College alumni =

Whittier College is a private liberal arts college in Whittier, California. Following are some of its notable alumni.

== Academia ==
- Willa Baum, historian and pioneer of oral history
- Arturo C. Porzecanski, Wall Street economist and university professor

== Business ==
- Fred D. Anderson, former CFO of Apple Computer
- Peter L. Harris, former CEO of FAO Schwarz, former CEO of the San Francisco 49ers
- Steve Matthiasson, California viticulturist and winemaker
- Arturo C. Porzecanski, Wall Street economist and university professor

== Entertainment ==
- James Adomian, comedian
- Andrea Barber, actress known for Full House and Fuller House;
- Herschel Daugherty, film, television and theatre director
- Ken Davitian, actor
- Bill Handel, radio personality
- Nancy Bea Hefley, Los Angeles Dodgers organist
- Cassey Ho, video blogger
- Cheryl Boone Isaacs, president of the Academy of Motion Picture Arts and Sciences
- Chris Jacobs, actor and television host
- Roger Lodge, television host
- Lupita Nyong'o (attended), Academy Award-winning actress
- Salvador Plascencia, author
- Arthur Allan Seidelman, Emmy Award-winning director
- Williametta Spencer, composer
- Geoff Stults, actor
- George Stults, actor
- June Squibb (attended), Academy Award-nominated actress
- Olive Sturgess, actress
- Linda Vallejo, artist

== Law ==
- Florence-Marie Cooper, former United States federal judge
- Robert D. Durham, justice, Oregon Supreme Court
- Nick Khan, attorney, president of WWE

== Literature and journalism ==
- Harry Adams, photojournalist and photographer who worked for the California Eagle and Los Angeles Sentinel
- Dorothy Baker, author
- Charles Bock, author
- Zilpha Keatley Snyder, Newbery Award-winning author
- Jessamyn West, author

== Medicine ==
- Albert R. Behnke, U.S. Navy physician who established the U.S. Naval Medical Research Institute
- William F. House, surgeon who developed the cochlear implant
- Connie Redbird Pinkerman-Uri, doctor and lawyer who campaigned against involuntary sterilisation of Native American women

== Politics ==
- Wayne R. Grisham, former member of the U.S. House of Representatives
- Richard Nixon, 37th president of the United States
- George E. Outland, former member of the U.S. House of Representatives
- Gregory Salcido, former mayor of Pico Rivera, California
- Tony Strickland, former California state senator

== Religion ==
- R. Kent Hughes, former pastor of College Church in Wheaton, Illinois, author
- David Moyer, bishop in the Traditional Anglican Communion

== Sports ==
- Peter Baron, team manager of Starworks Motorsport
- Ila Borders, first female pitcher to start in a professional baseball game
- Hubie Brooks (attended), former Major League Baseball player
- Jim Colborn, former Major League Baseball pitcher
- Ivan Guevara, former college basketball head coach for the Poets from 1968 to 1971 and San Jose State Spartans men's basketball from 1972 to 1979
- Elvin Hutchison, former National Football League player and official
- Gary Jones, former Major League Baseball pitcher
- Steve Jones, former Major League Baseball pitcher
- Brian Kelly, former Major League Lacrosse player
- Wally Kincaid, college baseball coach
- Timo Liekoski, Finnish soccer coach
- Tony Malinosky, former Major League Baseball player
- Chuck McMurtry, former defensive tackle in the American Football League
- Russ Purnell, former special teams coach for the NFL team Jacksonville Jaguars
- Jamie Quirk, former Major League Baseball player
- Gary Roenicke, former Major League Baseball outfielder
- Brendan Schaub (attended), mixed martial artist, stand-up comedian
- Jim Skipper, retired National Football League assistant coach
- Geoff Stults, played football for the Poets, and also professionally in the Austrian Football League; actor
- Don Sutton, Hall of Fame baseball player
