= March 18 Massacre =

1926 nationalist demonstration against the Beiyang Government

The March 18 Massacre (三·一八惨案) was a massacre that took place on 18 March 1926, amid an anti-warlord and anti-imperialist demonstration in Beijing, China. The date, March 18, was referred to by Chinese writer Lu Xun as the "darkest day since the founding of the Republic".

== Background ==
In November 1925, the Anti-Fengtian War broke out in northern China between the Soviet-backed Guominjun and the Japanese-backed Fengtian clique. By early 1926 the war was going badly for the Guominjun and, on March 8, they blockaded and mined Dagu harbor in defense of Tianjin. On March 12 a Japanese warship bombarded the Taku Forts in support of the Fengtian offensive, killing several Guominjun troops guarding the forts. In retaliation, Guominjun troops fired back and drove the warship out of the Tanggu harbor. The act was treated by Japan as a violation of the Boxer Protocol, signed in 1901 in the aftermath of the Boxer Rebellion. Four days later, ambassadors representing eight countries that were signatory nations to the Protocol sent an ultimatum to the Beiyang Government under Duan Qirui. The demand was that the Duan government should destroy all defense establishments on the Taku Forts.

== Events ==
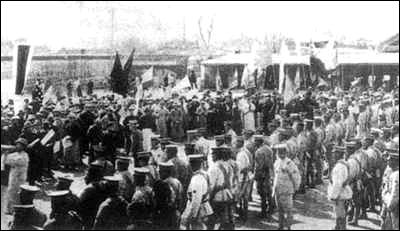
Students and soldiers outside Duan Qirui's presidential office on the Iron Lion Hutong, now Zhang Zizhong Road on March 18, 1926.

A demonstration was organized in front of the Tiananmen Gate on March 18. Li Dazhao, the leader of the demonstrators, made an emotional address. He called for an end to all unequal treaties signed between China and the foreign powers, in addition to expelling foreign ambassadors who issued the ultimatum. The Kuomintang's National Revolutionary Army, which was based in Guangzhou at the time, was urged to confront possible imperialist incursions since the Beiyang Government was unwilling to.

A subsequent march by the protesters ended on a square in front of Beiyang Government headquarters. Duan Qirui, who was worried about the situation becoming destabilized, ordered armed military police to disperse the protesters. The confrontation led to violence, in which 47 protesters were killed and more than 200 injured. Those who died included Liu Hezhen (刘和珍), a student of the Female Normal University of Peking. Li Dazhao was also wounded during the massacre.

== Aftermath ==
It was reported at the time that Duan Qirui personally went to the square where the massacre took place and knelt at the site in front of the dead bodies of the protesters.

Both the communist and nationalist organizers of the event were hunted down after the massacre. The warlord Zhang Zuolin also ordered many schools in Beiping to be searched for any books or periodicals affiliated with either the Kuomintang or the Chinese Communist Party. Enormous public pressure forced the Duan government to open an emergency meeting of the parliament. A resolution was passed calling for the punishment of those responsible for the massacre. In April 1926 the Duan government was ousted by the Guominjun.

Many memorials were built since the event. Some of them are located in prestigious universities such as Tsinghua and Peking.

== See also ==
- Northern Expedition (1926–1927)
- May 30 Movement
- History of Beijing
- Warlord era
- National Pacification Army
