= Zhili Army =

Zhili Army may refer to:

- Zhili Army (Fengtian clique)
- Zhili Army (Zhili clique)
