= Anti-Fengtian War =

1925–1926 war in northeastern China

- Part of the Warlord Era
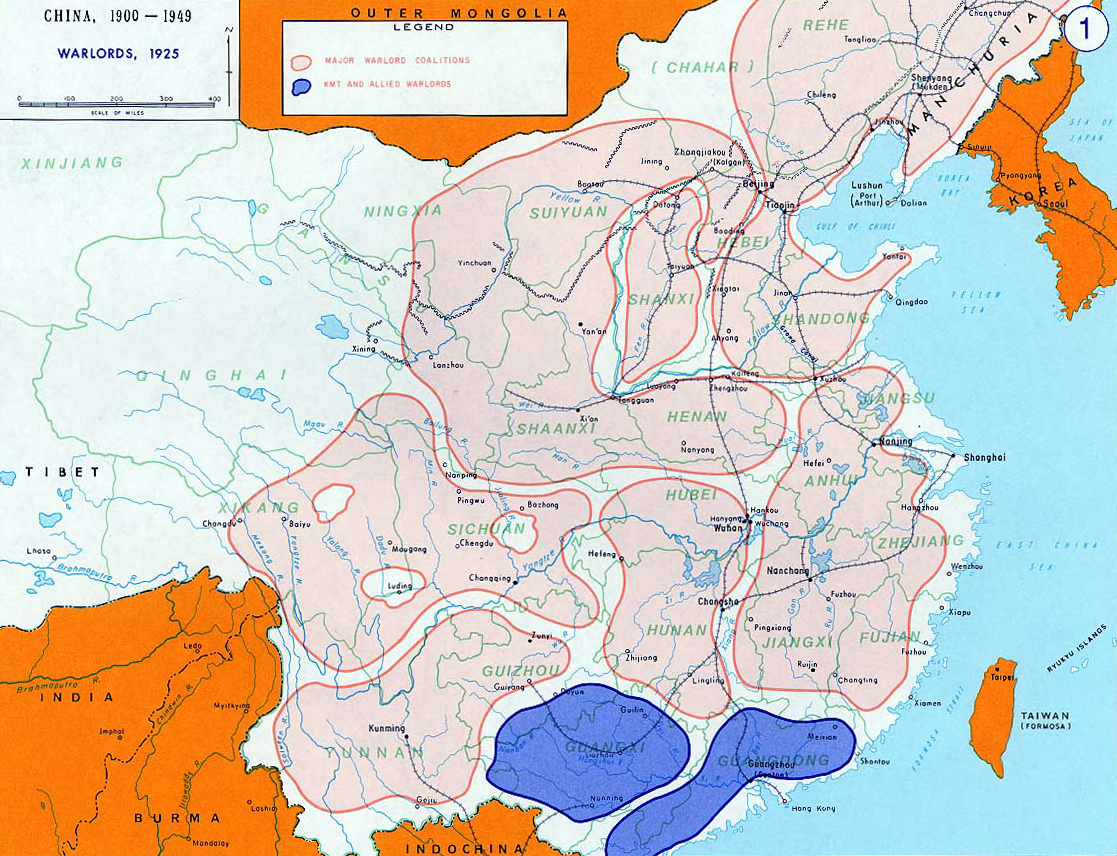
- China prior to the Anti-Fengtian War
Date	November 1925 – April 1926
Location	Northern China
Result	Fengtian and Zhili victory

Belligerents
Guominjun	Fengtian clique Zhili clique

Commanders and leaders
Feng Yuxiang	Zhang Zuolin; Wu Peifu Li Jinglin

Units involved
Guominjun armies Red Army advisors	Fengtian Armies: 2nd Army; White émigré mercenaries; Zhili forces

The Anti-Fengtian War (Chinese: 反奉战争; pinyin: Fǎnfèng zhànzhēng) was the last major civil war within the Republic of China's northern Beiyang government prior to the Northern Expedition. It lasted from November 1925 to April 1926 and was waged by the Guominjun against the Fengtian clique and their Zhili clique allies. The war ended with the defeat of the Guominjun and the end of the provisional executive government. The war is also known as either Guominjun-Fengtian War (Guófèng zhànzhēng, 国奉战争), or the Third Zhili–Fengtian War (Dì sān cì zhífèng zhànzhēng, 第三次直奉战争).

== Cause ==
The result of the Second Zhili–Fengtian War had led to the creation of a provisional executive government in Beijing in November 1924, where an informal triumvirate formed by Fengtian's Zhang Zuolin, the Guominjun's Feng Yuxiang and the Anhui clique's Duan Qirui had ruled. Duan's position as head of state was merely as a figurehead, however, as his clique had been almost destroyed. His small army of bodyguards operated solely within the capital he now figuratively ruled.

Zhang was the strongest of the three leaders and controlled the wealthy northeastern provinces. Feng's smaller army controlled the poorer northwest. As such, the power sharing arrangement between the two was destined to fail: Zhang was a monarchist backed by Japan, whereas Feng dabbled with radical politics, Christianity and revolutionary idealism all with Soviet support. Duan, lacking a power base of his own, played the two against each other in order to retain some control.

Throughout the summer of 1925, both Zhang and Feng began soliciting help from their former Zhili enemy, Wu Peifu. Seething at Feng's earlier betrayal during the Beijing Coup, Wu sealed an alliance with Zhang in November. This alliance would last until the defeat of both cliques under the Northern Expedition in 1928.

== Course ==
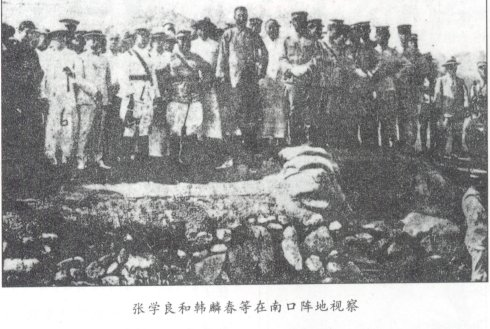
Zhang Xueliang and Han Linchun inspected in Nankou

In October 1925, Guo Songling, a division commander of the Fengtian clique, defected to Feng's Guominjun clique. From November 22 he began to lay siege to Mukden, the capital city of his former Fengtian master. Chiang Kai-shek sought to convince Sun Chuanfang to also defect, though to the Kuomintang. Sun, who was affiliated with Wu Peifu's Zhili clique, was a popular target to woo; having recently fought against Zhang's armies, he was openly unhappy about his enforced alliance with the Fengtian clique. Sun, however, refused and executed Chiang's emissaries. Chiang retaliated in turn by executing Sun's envoys.

A power struggle was also taking place among the key figures in the KMT. Wang Jingwei, Chiang Kai-shek's rival for absolute control over the Nationalist Party, proposed sending Chiang to Feng's Guominjun as an adviser. Chiang saw this as an attempt to detach him from his Whampoa power base and declined.

On December 24, in a stunning reversal of fortune, Guo's siege of Mukden was lifted and he was killed. The Guominjun began hemorrhaging soldiers, both from fighting and desertion, as it tried to hold off the combined armies of Wu Peifu, Zhang Zuolin, Li Jinglin and Zhang Zongchang. In January Feng resigned as a warlord and moved to the Soviet Union to study. Japan supported Zhang's forces, directly providing air and naval support. During an artillery attack on Guominjun forces civilians were killed, leading to protests in Beijing and the March 18 Massacre. Though Duan expressed his remorse at the brutal suppression of the protests, the Guominjun removed him from office the next month.

In December 1925, Feng Yuxiang of the Guominjun temporarily seized the city of Tianjin from Li Jinglin.

In April 1926, in order to appease the Zhili clique, the Guominjun released the deposed ex-president Cao Kun, who had been put under arrest by Feng in 1923. Wu did not respond. The Young Marshal, Zhang Xueliang, had his army occupy the capital, with Wu's troops arriving a little later. They sacked the capital, causing much chaos and leading to the collapse of much of the Beiyang government's bureaucracy. It would not fully recover until its occupation by the Nationalists in 1928.

Guominjun troops tried to flee through Shanxi, but the Shanxi clique led by Yan Xishan maintained a very strict neutrality policy and attacked any soldiers that encroached their borders. Yan, an ex-Tongmenghui member, was sympathetic with the Guominjun but did not want his province drawn into civil war. He would go on to side with Feng during the Northern Expedition and Central Plains War.

== Aftermath ==
Though jointly occupying Beijing, Zhang and Wu could not agree as to who should lead the new government. Wu wanted to restore Cao to the presidency, whereas Zhang hinted at restoring the last Manchu Emperor, Puyi. In the end they resorted to a string of short-lived and powerless interim cabinets; however, with the Zhili clique decimated, Zhang personally took charge of the government as a dictator. Militarily, the war had also caused the Zhili clique to shift their armies northward, leaving their southern flank and industrial base thinly defended against the underestimated armies of the KMT. This would prove crucial when, in July 1926, the KMT launched its Northern Expedition. The remainder of the Guominjun which held out northwest of Beijing would fold into the National Revolutionary Army as the KMT advanced.

== Bibliography ==
- Kössler, Reinhart (1988). "Revolution in a foreign land: eyewitness accounts by Soviet advisers to China, 1923 – 1927". In Frits L. van Holthoon; Marcel van der Linden (eds.). Internationalism in the Labour Movement: 1830–1940. Leiden, New York City, Copenhagen, Cologne: Brill Publishers. pp. 109–134.
- Lenkoff, Aleksandr N.; Raymond, Boris (1967). Life of a Russian emigré soldier: oral history transcript / and related material, 1966–1967. Berkeley, California: Regional Oral History Office.
- Waldron, Arthur; Cull, Nicholas (1995). "'Modern Warfare in China in 1924–1925': Soviet film propaganda to support Chinese Militarist Zhang Zuolin". Historical Journal of Film, Radio and Television. 15 (3). Abingdon-on-Thames: Routledge: 407–424. doi:10.1080/01439689500260291.
