= Chang Yinhuai =

Chinese warlord and general

- 常蔭槐

Governor of Heilongjiang
- In office 1928 – 10 January 1929

Personal details
- Born: 1876/1888 Jilin, Qing Dynasty
- Died: 10 January 1929 Shenyang, Fengtian, Republic of China

Chang Yinhuai (Chinese: 常蔭槐; 1876–1888 - 1929) was a Chinese warlord and general active during the Warlord Era working under the Fengtian clique. He was the governor of Heilongjiang, Minister of Communications, and a close friend and associate of Yang Yuting.

== Life ==
Chang Yinhuai was born in Jilin to a family originating in Shandong. For his education, he attended the Fengtian Law and Public Administration Academy, where he was educated to become an administrator. He later became a judge in a military court, where he served for a short amount of time.

For a time, Chang was appointed the chief of the Fengtian military police. In 1927, he started working with the Communications Clique as the Minister of Communications for the Beiyang government under the Fengtian clique, which meant that he had considerable power over media. Sometime during the same year, he played a major role in the construction of the Dahushan-Tongliao Railway. During the Northern Expedition, he was charged with the transport of ammunition down the Beijing-Mukden Railway. In 1928, Chang was appointed governor of Heilongjiang by Zhang Xueliang, who had recently taken over the Fengtian clique and its attached National Pacification Army.

Upon becoming governor of Heilongjiang, Chang's hatred for Zhang Xueliang became more apparent. He refused to lend money to Zhang, and even started building up his own army. On 10 January 1929, Chang and Yang went to Zhang to demand that Chang be appointed Northeast Railway Supervisor, a new role they wanted to create so they could take over the China Eastern Railway. When they left, Zhang ordered the two men's execution. Zhang himself claimed that this action was due to a conspiracy by Chang and Yang to rebel against the Fengtian clique, while Zhang's secretary traced it back to the poor attitudes Yang and Chang held toward Zhang, their superior.
