= Steve Matthiasson =

American winemaker

Steve Matthiasson is an American farmer, viticulturist, and winemaker known for his contributions to the low-to-moderate alcohol California wine movement.

Along with his wife, Jill Matthiasson, he co-founded Matthiasson Family Vineyards in Napa Valley, California in 2003. Matthiasson's expertise has made him one of Napa's top viticultural consultants since 1995. He has worked with several wineries, including Araujo, Dalla Valle, Spottswoode, David Arthur, Chappellet, and Stag's Leap Wine Cellars, and has mentored many winegrowers throughout his career.

== Early life and education ==
Matthiasson was born in Winnipeg, Canada, to two anthropology professors. He earned his Bachelors of Arts in philosophy from Whittier College in 1991, before relocating to San Francisco in the early 1990s, where he worked as a bike messenger for three years. He later pursued advanced studies at UC Davis, earning his MS in Horticulture with a focus on Pest Management of Trees and Vines in 1996. Matthiasson began his professional career in vineyard management at Four Seasons AG Consulting in Modesto, where he worked with growers to implement practices aimed at reducing pesticide use.

In 1999, Matthiasson joined the Lodi-Woodbridge Winegrape Commission, where he collaborated with Dr. Cliff Ohmart to co-author the influential Lodi Winegrower's Workbook: A Self-Assessment of Integrated Vineyard Practices. This work laid the foundation for the Wine Institute's "Code of Sustainable Winegrowing Practices Self-Assessment Workbook," which has been adopted by over 1,400 vineyards and wineries Following the completion of the workbook, Matthiasson applied his expertise as a research viticulturist at R.H. Phillips Winery in Yolo County.

In 2002, Steve and his wife, Jill Matthiasson, relocated to Napa Valley, where he still currently resides. In 2003, they founded their wine brand in Napa, acquired their first vineyard in 2006, and purchased their winery in 2017. In his spare time, he enjoys spending time with his wife and two sons, skateboarding, and listening to punk rock bands such as Minutemen, Black Flag, Minor Threat, and Dead Kennedys.

== Wines ==
Matthiasson emphasises organic and regenerative farming, along with a farm-to-table approach. He has played a significant role in fostering a more diverse and sustainable wine culture in the region. Ultimately, his emphasis on lower temperature-controlled fermentation has set new standards for the industry.

He produces a diverse range of wines that are both restrained and classically balanced, utilizing both familiar and lesser-known grape varieties. While he specializes in widely recognized varieties such as Chardonnay and Cabernet Sauvignon, Matthiasson also works with grapes that are less commonly found in Napa Valley, including Refosco dal Peduncolo Rosso, Cabernet Franc, Ribolla Gialla, Merlot, Tocai Friulano, Petit Verdot, and Schioppettino. The white wines produced by Matthiasson are influenced by the styles of northern Italy's Friuli region, while his red wines are predominantly crafted with the Bordeaux tradition.

Matthiasson's wine has been featured in The New York Times, The Wall Street Journal, the San Francisco Chronicle, Wine Enthusiast Magazine, Bon Appétit Magazine, In-Style Magazine, Decanter Magazine, Food & Wine Magazine, and The Wine Spectator.

== Achievements ==
Matthiasson has been named Winemaker of the Year by both Food and Wine Magazine and the San Francisco Chronicle, and is a co-author of the California Code of Sustainable Winegrowing. He has been nominated six times for the James Beard Award for Outstanding Wine, Spirits, or Beer Professional from 2014 to 2019.

== Other ==
Matthiasson has held various leadership roles, including serving as the past President of the Association of Applied Integrated Pest Management Ecologists and the former Chair of the Viticulture Committee for the California Enological Research Association. Additionally, he has been a Director of the Napa County Farm Bureau, a Board Member of the Applied Ecologists Foundation, and a member of the review committee for the American Vineyard Foundation.

He serves as co-chair of the 280 Project, a six-month program providing BIPOC students with opportunities to gain hands-on experience in winemaking.
