= Chu Yupu =

Chinese general (1887–1929)

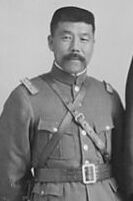
- Chu Yupu in 1927
- Born: 1887 Wenshang County, Shandong Province, Qing dynasty
- Died: 1929 (aged 41–42) Muping County, Shandong Province, Republic of China
- Allegiance: Beiyang clique; Fengtian clique
- Conflicts: Second Revolution; Second Zhili–Fengtian War; Northern Expedition

Chu Yupu (Chinese: 褚玉璞; 1887–1929) was a Chinese general who served under Yuan Shikai and later Zhang Zongchang. In 1921 he entered the service of Fengtian Province warlord Zhang Zuolin. He first fought against Sun Yat-sen's Kuomintang forces in August 1913. He later became leader of the Fengtian clique's Zhili Army and military governor of Zhili province in 1926. During the Northern Expedition he fought against the Guominjun forces of Feng Yuxiang and the National Revolutionary Army of Chiang Kai-shek. After he returned from Korea to Shandong, he was murdered. Accounts differ on how he died: According to some accounts, Liu Zhennian had him killed; others report that he was captured by vengeful peasants. They either buried him alive, or buried him up to his chin so that "black ants and the searing sun gave him the slow death he deserved".
