= Willa Baum =

American historian (1926–2006)

- Born: October 4, 1926; Chicago, Illinois, U.S.
- Died: May 18, 2006 (aged 79)
- Education: Whittier College; University of California, Berkeley
- Occupation: Oral historian

Willa Klug Baum (October 4, 1926 – May 18, 2006) was an American oral historian whose pioneering work in oral history methodology and interview techniques served as the foundation for the establishment of oral history as a discipline.

Born in Chicago, Baum attended Whittier College, studying history under Professor Paul Smith, who once called Willa his second-best student ever, after Richard Nixon. During her graduate studies in the history department at U.C. Berkeley, Baum learned of Hubert Howe Bancroft's interviews conducted in the 1860s and 1870s. Recognizing the historical value of these accounts, Baum and fellow graduate student Corinne Lathrop Gilb set up an Oral History program at U.C. Berkeley, which later became the Regional Oral History Office. Baum became the director in 1958, a position she held until her retirement in 2000.

Under Baum's directorship, ROHO amassed over 1,600 oral histories, filled with first-hand accounts of the participants in significant historical events in California and the West. These eyewitness accounts of history are on deposit at over 800 libraries worldwide, and stand as an invaluable resource to researchers worldwide.

ROHO worked quickly to recognize and document historical movements; for example, ROHO's Suffragists and Women in Politics series began in the early 1970s before most campuses had women's studies programs. Similarly, ROHO's early documentation of the disability rights movement now provides primary research materials for the new disability studies program at UC Berkeley.

Ongoing ROHO projects include oral histories of the wine industry, mining, the environmental movement, the Disability Rights Movement, the Free Speech movement, anthropology, UC history, engineering, science, biotechnology, music, architecture, and the arts. ROHO's largest projects document California government from the Earl Warren Era to the present.

Upon her retirement, Baum was bestowed the Berkeley Citation for her service to UC Berkeley, the President's Citation for her contributions to the University of California, and the Hubert Howe Bancroft Award for her leadership.
