= Arturo Porzecanski =

Uruguayan-born economist

Arturo C. Porzecanski is a Uruguayan-born economist who has spent his entire adult life in the United States.

== Early life ==
Born (November 2, 1949) and raised in Montevideo, Uruguay, of European Jewish immigrant parents, Porzecanski came to the United States in early 1968 and earned his B.A. degree in economics at Whittier College (1968-1971) and then his M.A. and Ph.D. in economics at the University of Pittsburgh (1971-1975).

== Financial industry career ==
After a summer internship as a visiting economist at the International Monetary Fund (1973), and a year-and-a-half stint as a research economist at the Center for Latin American Monetary Studies in Mexico City (1975–76), he began his Wall Street career as an international economist and country risk analyst at the Morgan Guaranty Trust Co. of New York, one of the forerunners of today's JP Morgan Chase (1977-1989). He went on to become the chief economist at Republic National Bank of New York (1989-1992); chief emerging-markets economist at Kidder, Peabody & Co. (1992-1993); chief economist for the Americas at ING Group (1994-2000); and chief economist for emerging markets at ABN AMRO (2000-2005). He was recognized in 2005 for his outstanding professional accomplishments on Wall Street and named a "Legacy Laureate" by his alma mater, the University of Pittsburgh.

== Academia, think tanks and related ==
Porzecanski opened up a second act in his professional career in mid-2005 by becoming a full-time university professor of international economics, a shift in professional direction that was part of a generational handover by Wall Street pioneers in emerging-markets research who had also taken early retirement and started out on new career paths. Having taught economics on an adjunct basis at Columbia University and New York University, he was a visiting professor of economics at Williams College in Spring 2005. He was appointed to the faculty of the School of International Service at American University as of Fall 2005, first as Scholar of International Finance and then, as of Fall 2007, as Distinguished Economist in Residence. In 2012, he was also named Director of the International Economic Relations M.A. degree program at SIS, a position held until August 2018. In mid-2021, after sixteen years, Porzecanski retired from his full-time faculty appointment.

Besides devoting himself to teaching, mentoring and policy-oriented research in his field, Porzecanski has provided expert-witness and other consulting services to law firms and institutional investors, as well as to U.S. government agencies and multilateral organizations. He has also served as a Dispute Resolution Arbitrator for the Financial Industry Regulatory Authority and was a Senior Associate at the think tank Center for Strategic and International Studies during 2007–2013. In July 2020, President Donald Trump appointed Porzecanski to the President's Advisory Commission on Hispanic Prosperity. Following his retirement from academia, he was named Research Fellow by American University's Center for Latin American and Latino Studies, and Global Fellow (2021-2025) by the think tank The Woodrow Wilson International Center for Scholars.

== Patient advocacy ==
Since late 2005, Porzecanski has struggled with an exceedingly rare illness, Systemic Capillary Leak Syndrome (SCLS), which left him partially disabled and brought him near death several times. He became an international advocate for those affected by the disease, setting up a website for patients, caregivers and physicians around the world to share information and provide support, and serving as its resident expert. He also persuaded the National Institutes of Health to carry out basic biomedical research on this syndrome. In early 2009, Porzecanski was profiled in the Health section of The Washington Post for this initiative and his determination to cope with this life- and limb-threatening illness. In 2016, the National Institutes of Health publicly acknowledged Porzecanski's "indispensable" role in spreading awareness of SCLS and in enabling NIH scientific research on the deadly disease. In 2018, Porzecanski won a lawsuit against the Secretary of the U.S. Health and Human Services Department in U.S. federal court, which overturned a Medicare denial of treatment with intravenous immunoglobulin (IVIG), a therapy which has become the standard of care for SCLS patients. His leadership role as a patient advocate was recognized by Whittier College with an Outstanding Alumni Award for Community Impact.

== Scholarship ==
Porzecanski has published widely in the fields of international finance and Latin American economics, with scholarly chapters in several edited volumes in economics and law and articles in peer-reviewed journals such as Business Economics, Chicago Journal of International Law, Development, Ethics & International Affairs, Fordham International Law Journal, International Finance, Journal of Banking and Finance, Journal of Developing Areas, Journal of Money, Credit and Banking, Law and Contemporary Problems, National Tax Journal and, World Economics. His only scholarly, sole-authored book, "Uruguay's Tupamaros: The Urban Guerrilla", a contribution to political science, was published in the United States while he was a 23-year-old graduate student in economics. He was a member of the Board of Directors of the Tinker Foundation during 2007-2024, and has been a life member of the Council on Foreign Relations since 1991.

== Bibliography ==
- "Personal website". Arturo C. Porzecanski.
- "Publications". ResearchGate
- "Citations". Google Scholar.
- "Publications". IDEAS.
- "Professional profile". LinkedIn.
