= Regional Oral History Office =

The Oral History Center is part of The Bancroft Library at the University of California, Berkeley. The office was founded in 1954. OHC conducts, analyzes, teaches about, and preserves oral history interviews on a wide range of topics related to the history of California and the United States. OHC staff also conduct research on a wide range of historical topics, utilizing oral history as a central primary source to their scholarship.

== History ==
OHC's original name was the Regional Cultural History Office. It was the second oral history office founded in the country, following only Columbia University. The first interview conducted at the office, before it was officially recognized as a unit on campus, was with Alice B. Toklas, the long-time partner of Gertrude Stein.

Since its founding in 1954, the OHC has conducted thousands of interviews in a wide variety of subject areas ranging from law and jurisprudence to food and wine. ROHO features especially strong collections on the development of the arts and letters, science and technology, and labor, social, political, and community history in California. The OHC has also conducted numerous interviews on the history of the University of California. Interviews with scientists include Nobel Prize winners such as Arthur Kornberg, Paul Berg, Donald A. Glaser, and Charles Townes. Other notable interviews with scientists include Herbert Boyer and Stanley N. Cohen. The OHC has also conducted significant oral histories with well-known artists and authors, such as Dorothea Lange, Ansel Adams, and Carl Rakosi.

The OHC houses collections of oral histories related to women's suffrage and the home front during World War II.

The interviews conducted by staff are deposited in over 700 manuscript libraries worldwide. Many of the interviews are accessible online. The Bancroft Library also houses the original tapes for all of the interviews conducted by the center. Once completed, the oral histories are referenced by both scholars and students around the world.

The group's first director was Corinne Gilb, who led the program from 1954 to 1958. Between 1958 and 2000, Willa Baum directed the center, then called the Regional Oral History Office. Under her tenure, the group amassed over 1,600 oral histories on a wide variety of subjects. Richard Cándida Smith, who was also a professor in the Department of History at the University of California, Berkeley, directed the office until spring of 2012. During Cándida Smith's tenure, the number of oral history transcripts made available online expanded dramatically.

Whether institutional or community oral history, the center's emphasis is on placing information and viewpoints in the historical record that might otherwise be lost. The OHC has conducted 5,000 oral histories, which totals tens of thousands of interview hours. Nearly every interview that has been transcribed is available for the public to read on the OHC website.
