= Zhili Army (Fengtian clique) =

Chinese warlord military unit (1924–28)

- Leaders: Li Jinglin (until 1925); Chu Yupu (from 1925)
- Dates active: 1924–1928
- Allegiance: Fengtian clique (Beiyang government)
- Group: Fengtian 1st Division
- Headquarters: Tianjin
- Active regions: Northern Republic of China
- Size: 26,000 (1924)
- Part of: Shandong–Zhili Army (from 1925); National Pacification Army (from 1926)
- Wars: the Warlord Era

The Fengtian clique's Zhili Army was a Chinese Warlord Era fighting force that controlled the Republic of China's Zhili province from 1924 until 1928, with the exception of a few months in 1925/26. Not related to the Zhili clique, it instead originated as Fengtian Second Army and operated as part of the Fengtian clique's armed forces. It was led by two successive Fengtian warlords, Li Jinglin and Chu Yupu, who always followed the orders of Zhang Zuolin, the Fengtian clique's overall leader. Although the Zhili Army's quality declined after 1925, it distinguished itself in numerous battles until it was disbanded in 1928 after being defeated by the National Revolutionary Army in the Northern Expedition.

== History ==
=== Conquest of Zhili province ===
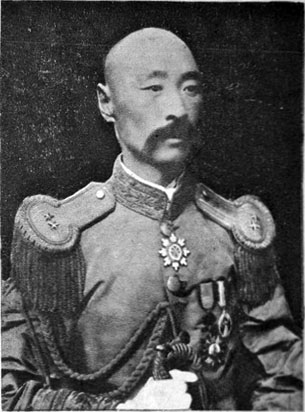
Li Jinglin in 1924, as commander of the Fengtian Second Army

The Fengtian Second Army was formed under Li Jinglin for the second war between the Fengtian and Zhili cliques in 1924. At this conflict's start, the army numbered 26,000 men and was organized into four mixed brigades and one division. The latter was Li's personal unit, the Fengtian 1st Division, and it would continue to form the core of the army throughout its existence. Upon the start of hostilities, the Fengtian clique went on the offensive in two theaters. Li's army was assigned to the northern one, which was located northeast of Beijing and marked by mountainous terrain without a clear front. Facing mostly sub-par Zhili forces, the Second Army rapidly advanced and managed to capture all important strategic cities of Rehe Province between 15 September and 9 October, namely Kailu, Chaoyang, Fuxin, Jianping, and Chifeng. These victories contributed to the decision of Zhili commander Feng Yuxiang to mostly stay out of the fighting and eventually to betray the Zhili clique. In turn, Li also decided not to move against Fang's non-aggressive troops, and instead to move south. There, his troops joined Zhang Zongchang's forces for an attack on Lengkou in late September.

The daring offensive of Zhang and Li's combined forces against the extremely significant Lengkou pass was "probably the single most important engagement" of the war. Had Feng Yuxiang and his allies decided to launch a counter-attack during this offensive, they could have encircled and destroyed Li and Zhang's armies. Instead, they stayed put and left the Zhili forces at Lengkou to face the Fengtian offensive on their own. As result, the Lengkou garrison retreated and allowed the Fengtian armies to capture the pass without a fight. This was a decisive victory, as Li and Zhang's armies were now able to strike at the Zhili clique's flank. Nevertheless, they initially decided to wait, as the possibility remained that the Zhili forces to their rear might still try to encircle them.

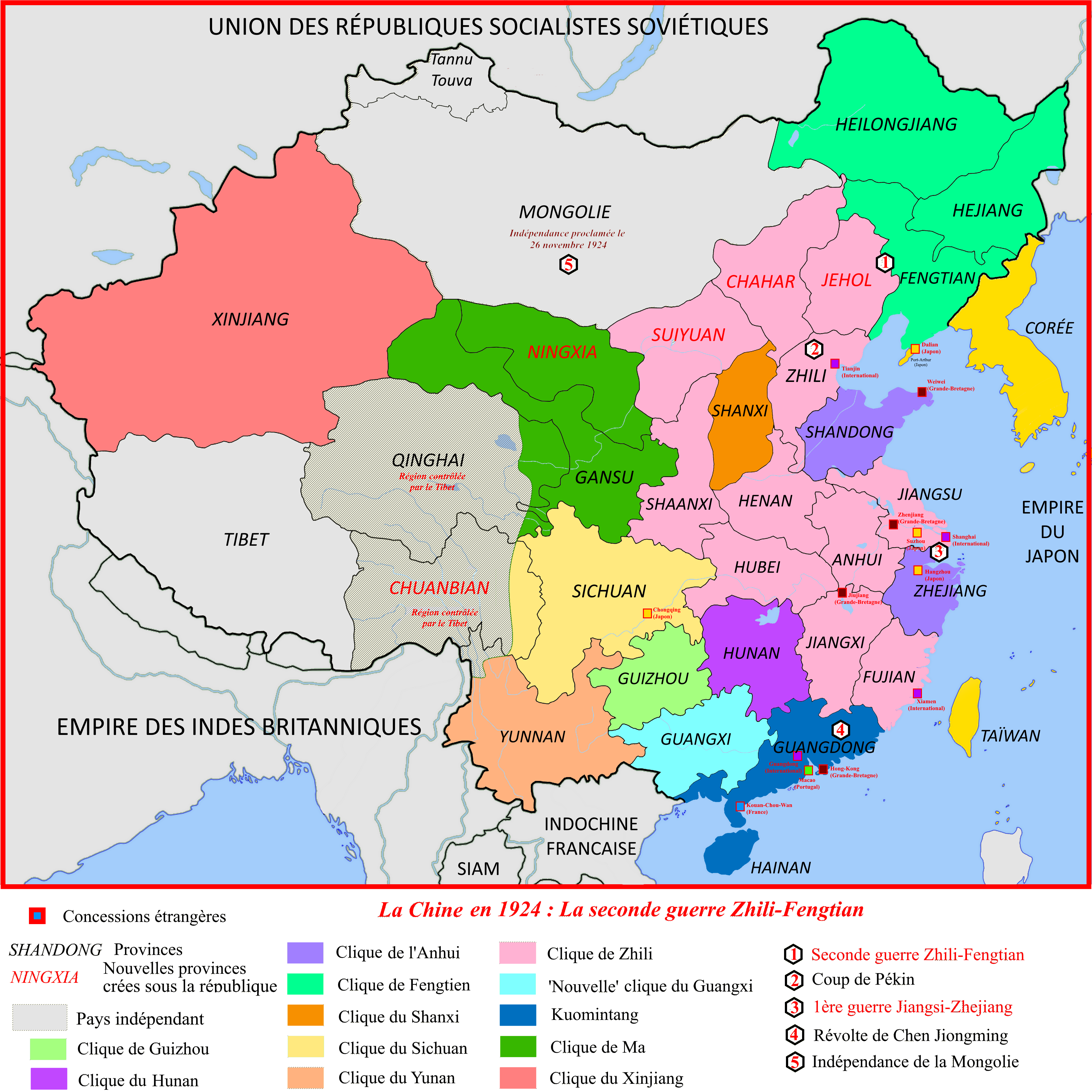
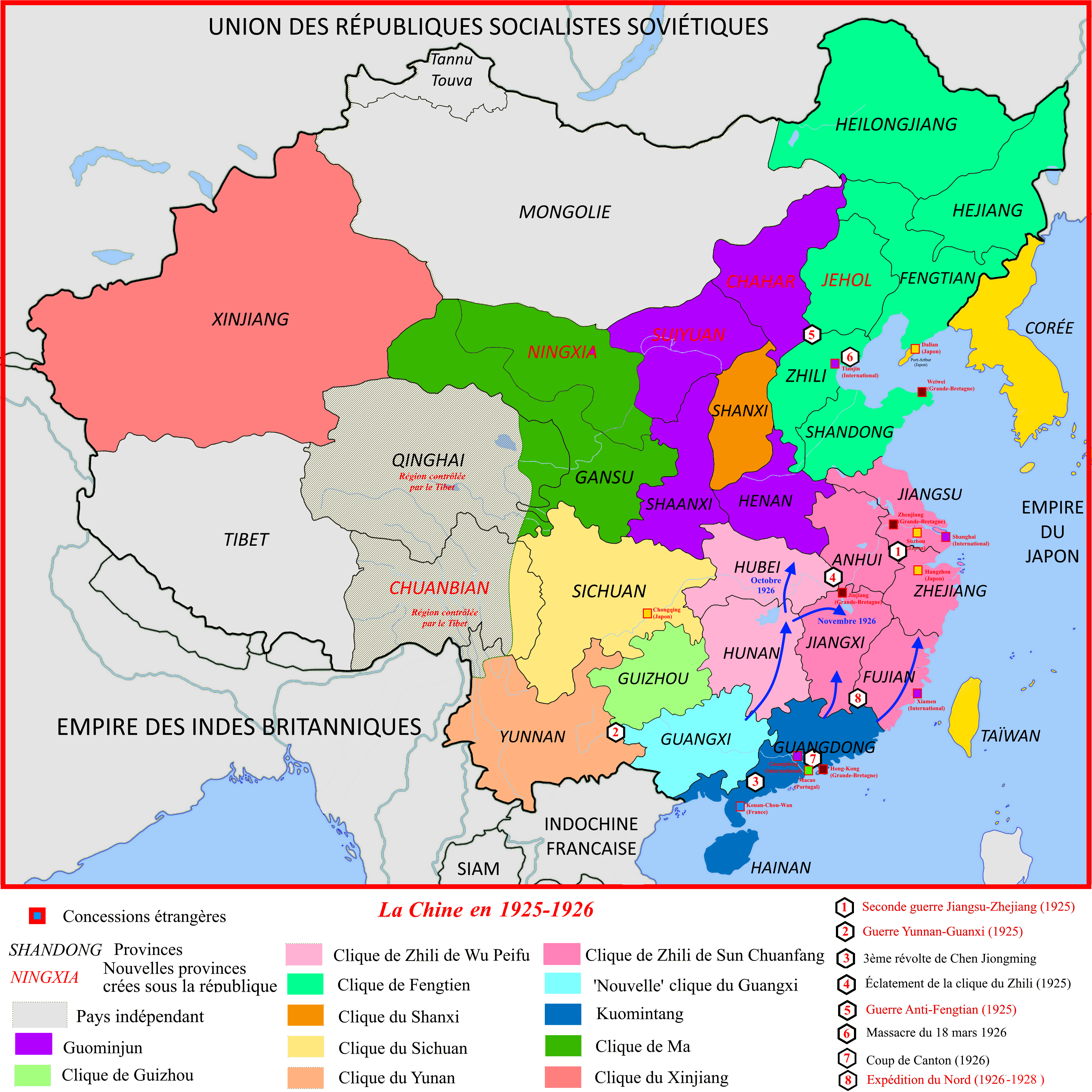
The Republic of China before (left) and after (right) the Second Zhili–Fengtian War:
Fengtian clique control
Zhili clique control
Guominjun control

This came not to pass, however, as Feng Yuxiang launched the Beijing Coup against the Zhili clique's official leader and President of the Republic of China, Cao Kun, on 23 October. Zhang and Li's armies exploited this by launching a massive offensive along the Luan River. On 27/28 October, they broke the disorganized Zhili forces protecting Luanzhou, and thereby divided the Zhili military into two isolated pockets, one at Tianjin and the other at Qinhuangdao and Shanhaiguan. The Fengtian Second Army under Li then proceeded to widen this breach by destroying Dong Zhengguo's troops at Tangshan. These massive defeats effectively caused the Zhili clique's military to collapse, and over the following days a disorganized retreat began which quickly turned into a rout. As both Feng's newly christened Guominjun as well as the Fengtian armies continued their attacks, at least 120,000 Zhili soldiers surrendered.

On 5 November, the Fengtian Second Army arrived at Tianjin. At this point, the town had been abandoned by the Zhili clique and occupied by Guominjun troops under Wang Chengbin. Although Wang had declared himself governor of Zhili province, he had only one Guominjun division as well as 1200 Zhili clique deserters under his command; Li promptly tried to remove him from office by force. Wang fled into Tianjin's Japanese concession, while his troops surrendered to the Fengtian Second Army. Former Zhili clique soldiers in Tianjin were then integrated into Zhang Zongchang and Li's armies, with both receiving four mixed brigades.

=== Li's rule over Zhili and the Anti-Fengtian War ===
On 11 December 1924, Li Jinglin was officially appointed civil and military governor of Zhili province and set up a "repressive and predatory" regime. His rule was supported by the Fengtian Second Army, which he significantly expanded as his private army with new recruits from Zhili province. Eventually, Zhili natives became the majority in the army, which now came to be known as "Zhili Army". Among the new recruits was also the renown Wudang quan martial arts master Fu Zhensong. A close associate of Li Jinglin (who was a renowned martial artist in his own right) since 1921, he was appointed in 1925 to lead a battalion of six hundred men in the Zhili Army. Fu eventually left the military in 1927. Despite this influx of new troops, the old Manchurian Fengtian 1st Division remained the core of Li's army. Over time, the Zhili Army's soldiers and artillery came to be considered among the best of the Fengtian clique.

Li's largely unchallenged rule over Zhili province lasted until the Anti-Fengtian War in late 1925, during which an 80,000-man strong army of Feng Yuxiang's Guominjun attacked Zhili. At the time, Zhang Zuolin was facing a rebellion of one of his generals, Guo Songling, so that the Fengtian clique's leader commanded Li to hold up the Guominjun for as long as possible. Fighting between the invaders and the Zhili Army consequently started on 9 December at Tianjin. Although outnumbered 3 to 1 and facing an extremely cold winter, Li's army refused to yield. The battle for the city consequently became extremely bitter and "gruesome", as neither side gave quarter. Amid this struggle, the Zhili Army also came into conflict with the United States' 15th Infantry Regiment which tried to keep the Peking-Mukden Railway open. In one instance on 11 December, a train protected by U.S. soldiers was fired on by Li's artillery on the way to Tianjin; although nobody was hurt, the train was forced to return to Beijing. Li eventually decided to give up Tianjin on 23 December. Having inflicted heavy casualties on the Guominjun, the Zhili Army managed to retreat largely intact in good order to Shandong, which was held by Li's old ally Zhang Zongchang. Li then merged his army with Zhang's and prepared to counterattack. By this time, however, Li had fallen under suspicion of being disloyal to Zhang Zuolin and having collaborated with Guo. He was consequently removed from command, and the leadership over his troops was given to one of Zhang Zongchang's subordinates, Chu Yupu. Under Chu, the Zhili Army together with other Fengtian forces launched a counter-attack against the Guominjun and retook Zhili including Tianjin in course of heavy fighting during March 1926.

=== Operations under Chu Yupu ===
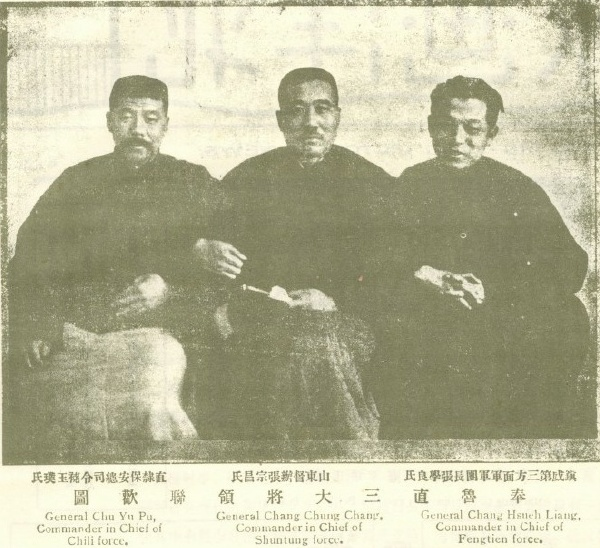
Chu Yupu (left), second and final commander of the Zhili Army, with his superiors Zhang Zongchang (center) and Zhang Xueliang (right)

With both the Zhili Army as well as the Zhili province under his command, Chu Yupu was appointed governor of the latter on 7 April 1926. Nevertheless, his actual power was limited, as his forces effectively operated as part of Zhang Zongchang's military and followed all commands of Zhang Zuolin – the Zhili Army undertook no independent operations between 1925 and 1928. The united troops of Chu Yupu and Zhang Zongchang were constantly moved from one war zone to the next, and without the necessary time and resources to reorganize the Zhili-Shandong troops, their quality degraded. Though professional elements remained, the Zhili Army was forced to replace casualties and expand its manpower with mostly unreliable recruits such as surrendered enemies, provincial militiamen and bandits. After a few years, the Zhili-Shandong Army was considered to have "some of the worst troops in China"; furthermore, organization worsened to such an extent that its commanders, including Chu and Zhang, eventually had no idea how many soldiers they even commanded. By May 1927, estimates of the combined Zhili-Shandong Army ranged around 135,000.

The last war in which the Zhili Army was involved was the Northern Expedition, a campaign launched by the National Revolutionary Army (NRA) in 1926 from southern China to reunify the country. This operation was opposed by a warlord alliance, known as the National Pacification Army which was led by Zhang Zuolin and whose core was formed by the Fengtian clique. As part of the National Pacification Army and under the overall command of Zhang Zongchang, the Zhili and Shandong Armies were sent into Jiangsu in December 1926. Although ordered to remain north of Yangtze, Zhang and Chu's troops crossed the river in February 1927. This was because the local National Pacification Army-affiliated warlord Sun Chuanfang was threatened to be overwhelmed by the NRA, and asked Zhang Zongchang to aid him in defending Nanjing and Shanghai. Hastily deployed and stretched out, however, the Zhili-Shandong forces proved unable to hold either city. Their defences already collapsed in March, forcing them to retreat across the Yangtze. There, however, Zhang and Chu's men managed to stabilize the frontline and even repelled a first NRA offensive across the river at Bengbu. Though historian Kwong Chi Man concluded that the Shandong–Zhili Army's operation south of the Yangtze was a "costly operational disaster", he also noted that it saved Sun's army from destruction.

Map of the Northern Expedition

The Zhili Army under Chu was next sent against Lanfeng, where it overran the NRA on 17 October and thus made it possible for the warlord alliance to strike against Henan. This opportunity was not exploited, however, as the National Pacification Army central command instead ordered an offensive against Shanxi. The Zhili Army consequently advanced into Henan alone. Its invasion was stopped at Kaifeng by Feng Yuxiang who had joined the Nationalists. The fighting at Kaifeng soon turned against the Zhili Army which was without support, exhausted, and even betrayed by Shanxi troops who switched sides during the battle. A counter-offensive by Feng overwhelmed Chu's army in early November, forcing it to retreat east of Shangqiu, where the front stabilized. This defeat was not decisive, but then Zhang Zongchang decided to launch a second offensive against Kaifeng with both Shandong as well as Zhili troops. Zhang wanted to defeat Feng before he was able to join up with the NRA units that attacked Xuzhou from Nanjing, but this preventive strike resulted in disaster. A counter-attack by Feng on 24 November completely destroyed the Shandong–Zhili Army's right wing in course of especially fierce fighting during which even several senior commanders were killed. Zhang Zongchang's forces fled with Feng's army in pursuit until Xuzhou, where the troops of Yu Xuezhong and Sun Chuanfang came to the Shandong–Zhili Army's aid and repelled Feng in early December. As Xuzhou was about to be surrounded by the NRA, however, the National Pacification Army was forced to abandon the city immediately after this battle. The two offensives against Kaifeng thus resulted in the Shandong–Zhili Army's complete defeat, high casualties (including four of six armoured trains), and shattered the army's morale. The Shandong–Zhili soldiers had managed to pin down Feng Yuxiang for a relatively long time; Kwong Chi Man speculates that they might have succeeded in defeating Feng and capturing Henan if they had been supported by other Fengtian forces. Meanwhile, the Zhili Army's grip on Zhili province itself weakened, as the local peasants rebelled against the Fengtian clique. Led by several secret societies, such as the Red Spear Society, the Society of the Heavenly Gate, and the Yellow Sand Society, they managed to capture twenty counties in southern Zhili.

To still turn the war in their favor, the National Pacification Army's leaders decided to launch a new major counter-offensive in April 1928. The remnants of the Zhili Army under Chu Yupu also took part in this operation, and began to attack the NRA positions east of Daming on 6 April. Unable to dislodge their opponents, the Zhili Army was forced to withdraw to Dezhou on 20–25 April. Attacks by National Pacification Army forces at other parts of the front also failed, and further to the east the Shandong Army under Zhang Zongchang completely collapsed when the NRA counterattacked. The following mass retreat of the National Pacification Army led to the fall of Shandong to the Nationalists and the effective end of the war. Though the Shandong–Zhili Army mostly disintegrated, Chu Yupu and Zhang Zongchang managed to keep around 70,000 men under their command, with whom they moved north. Refusing to surrender, they wanted to continue their resistance. On 4 June 1928, however, Zhang Zuolin was assassinated by the Japanese as he fled toward Manchuria, and the leadership of the Fengtian Armies passed to his son, the "Young Marshal" Zhang Xueliang. He wanted to make peace with the Nationalists, and consequently fell out with Chu Yupu and Zhang Zongchang. Military conflict broke out, and the remnants of the Shandong–Zhili Army were destroyed by the combined forces of the Nationalists and the "Young Marshal".

=== Disbandment and rebellion in Shandong ===
With the end of the Northern Expedition, the remnants of the defeated warlord armies were mostly disbanded, including Chu Yupu's Zhili Army; some of his troops were integrated into the NRA and fought in the Central Plains War. Tens of thousands former Shandong–Zhili Army soldiers remained unemployed, however, and tried to survive in precarious conditions in Shandong. As result, these ex-soldiers were willing to join a rebellion instigated by Zhang Zongchang and Chu Yupu against Liu Zhennian, ruler of northeastern Shandong, in 1929. Though the uprising enjoyed some initial successes, it eventually failed and the rebels dispersed to flee the NRA. The last remnants of Chu Yupu's followers, numbering 4,500, sook shelter in the town of Fushan, whose 20,000 inhabitants they took hostage. Besieged by government forces, Chu's men committed numerous atrocities, including mass rapes and using civilians as human shields. After 13 days, the town surrendered, and many of the surviving warlord soldiers were put to death by vengeful NRA troops and local civilians. Having probably bribed his opponents, Chu Yupu was allowed to go into exile. He was murdered, however, when he tried to return to Shandong soon after the failed rebellion.
