= Spottswoode Winery =

California winery

Coordinates: 38°30′0.8″N 122°28′43.7″W

Spottswoode Estate Vineyard & Winery is a winery on the western edge of St. Helena, California, in the St. Helena AVA of the Napa Valley, in the United States. The estate was established in 1882. The winery is a producer of Cabernet Sauvignon and Sauvignon Blanc. As of 2021, about 40 acres are under cultivation, which typically produces around 5,000 cases of wine per year.

== History ==
The estate was established in the Napa Valley in 1882 by George Schonewald, when he bought 31 acres and intended it to be a country retreat during the summer months. He named the estate Lyndenhurst. In 1884, Schonewald sold several acres to Frank Kraft, who began cultivating the vineyard and built the winery, and formed Kraft Wines. The original winery is still in use today and is used as a storage cellar. In 1906, Joseph Bliss purchased the estate and changed the name to Stonehurst. Two years later he sold it to Dr. George Allen who later sold it to the Spotts family, who gave the estate its current name.

In 1972, Mary Weber Novak purchased Spottswoode with her husband, Dr. Jack Novak. Though Jack died in 1977, Mary took over the estate and produced its first vintage in 1982, in time for the centenary of the estate. In 1985, it became the first vineyard in the Napa Valley to be farmed organically, shortly after Tony Soter became wine consultant, and it was certified organic in 1992. Sauvignon Blanc has been produced at Spottswoode since 1984. In 1986, the estate and the Napa Valley was badly affected by flooding. In 2010, the estate was producing 7000 cases a year, of which about 75% were Cabernets, and it became a seller of homemade olive oil. Mary Weber Novak died in September 2016 and the owner as of 2021 is her daughter, Beth Novak. Beth has been the CEO of the company since 2007 and her sister Lindy is the Marketing Ambassador.

== Production and wines ==
The winery is a producer of Cabernet Sauvignon and Sauvignon Blanc. The vineyard at Spottswoode contains sandy, clay, gravel and loam soils. Wine is made using a combination of cement vats and stainless steel tanks and malolactic fermentation is conducted in the barrel. Cabernet Sauvignon is typically aged for about 22 months in 65% new French oak barrels. The Sauvignon Blanc is aged in a "combination of vessels, steel drums, concrete, egg shaped vats and French oak barrels". As of 2021, about 40 acres are under cultivation, which typically produces around 5,000 cases of wine per year. The estate, which has B Corp certification, is committed to climate change and employs numerous methods of production to deal with it in the future, including the use of long mesh canopies along the grape vines, designed to reduce the intensity of the sun.

Lux magazine describes Spottswoode wines as "wine aristocracy". The 2001 variety of Cabernet Sauvignon was grown and made by Rosemary Cakebread and was acclaimed, with Forbes describing it as "explosively delicious, with great tension and acidity, aromas of eucalyptus and balsamic alongside chocolate-mint leaf, leather, and aged cigar tobacco, and savory flavors of slate-like and almost volcanic minerality as well as flamed orange peel, golden chanterelles, cured black olives, cherry pit, dried currants, and sandalwood, with incense lingering on the long, lifted finish". The Spottswoode Estate Cabernet Sauvignon 2017 is described by Forbes as being "balanced and concentrated with currants, blueberries, black raspberries and gobs of mixed cherries, sandalwood, incense (especially on the finish), cedar, orange oil, and dark chocolate". Spottswoode's Sauvignon Blanc is noted for its citrus notes of lime, lemon, grapefruit, and mandarin.
