= Northern Expedition =

1926–1928 Kuomintang military campaign

- Part of the Warlord Era
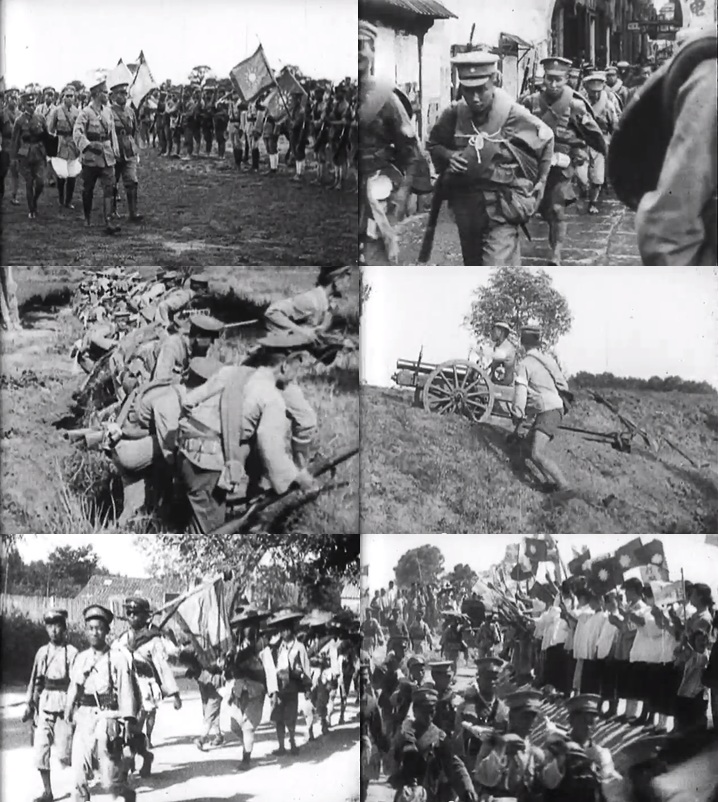
- Clockwise from top-left: Chiang inspecting soldiers of the National Revolutionary Army; NRA troops marching north; an NRA artillery unit in combat; civilians showing support for the NRA; peasants volunteering to join the expedition; NRA soldiers preparing to launch an attack.
Date	9 July 1926 – 29 December 1928 (2 years and 173 days)
Location	Southern to northern China
Result	Nationalist government victory: All Chinese warlords accept Nationalist rule of China; Overthrow of the Beiyang government; End of the Warlord Era; Nanjing–Wuhan split; Beginning of the Chinese Civil War

Belligerents
(Republic of China (1912–1949)) Nationalist government; United Front (until April 1927); National Revolutionary Army; Kuomintang; Chinese Communist Party (until 1927); Allied warlord armies (Guominjun, Guangxi, Shanxi army, others); Soviet Union; Comintern	(Republic of China (1912–1949)) Beiyang government; National Pacification Army; Fengtian clique; Zhili clique; Japan

Commanders and leaders
(Republic of China (1912–1949)) Chiang Kai-shek (Republic of China (1912–1949)) Feng Yuxiang (Republic of China (1912–1949)) Li Zongren (Republic of China (1912–1949)) Bai Chongxi (Republic of China (1912–1949)) He Yingqin (Republic of China (1912–1949)) Yan Xishan (Republic of China (1912–1949)) Zhang Fakui (Republic of China (1912–1949)) Li Jishen (Republic of China (1912–1949)) Tan Yankai (Republic of China (1912–1949)) Cheng Qian (Republic of China (1912–1949)) Deng Yanda; Zhou Enlai; Ye Ting (Soviet Union) Mikhail Borodin (Soviet Union) Vasily Blyukher	(Republic of China (1912–1949)) Zhang Zuolin X (Republic of China (1912–1949)) Zhang Xueliang (Republic of China (1912–1949)) Zhang Zongchang (Republic of China (1912–1949)) Yang Yuting (Republic of China (1912–1949)) Wu Peifu (Republic of China (1912–1949)) Sun Chuanfang (Republic of China (1912–1949)) Chu Yupu

Strength
c. 100,000 (July 1926) c. 264,000 (Dec. 1926) c. 700,000 (spring 1927) c. 1,000,000 (1928)	c. 700,000–1,000,000 (1926) c. 190,000–250,000 (Dec. 1928)
- 366,000-953,000 deaths (including non-combatants) estimated

The Northern Expedition was a military campaign launched by the National Revolutionary Army (NRA) of the Kuomintang (KMT) against the Beiyang government and other regional warlords in 1926. The purpose of the campaign was to reunify China, which had become fragmented in the aftermath of the 1911 Revolution. The expedition was led by Generalissimo Chiang Kai-shek, and was divided into two phases. The first phase ended in a 1927 political split between two factions of the KMT: the right-leaning Nanjing faction, led by Chiang, and the left-leaning faction in Wuhan, led by Wang Jingwei. The split was partially motivated by Chiang's Shanghai Massacre of Communists within the KMT, which marked the end of the First United Front. In an effort to mend this schism, Chiang Kai-shek stepped down as the commander of the NRA in August 1927, and went into exile in Japan.

The second phase of the expedition began in January 1928, when Chiang resumed command. By April 1928, the nationalist forces had advanced to the Yellow River. With the assistance of allied warlords, including Yan Xishan and Feng Yuxiang, the nationalist forces secured a series of decisive victories against the Beiyang Army. As they approached Beijing, Zhang Zuolin, leader of the Manchuria-based Fengtian clique, was forced to flee and was later assassinated shortly thereafter by the Japanese. His son, Zhang Xueliang, took over as the leader of the Fengtian clique, and in December 1928, announced that Manchuria would accept the authority of the nationalist government in Nanjing. With the final piece of China under KMT control, the Northern Expedition concluded successfully and China was reunified, heralding the start of the Nanjing decade.

== Prelude ==
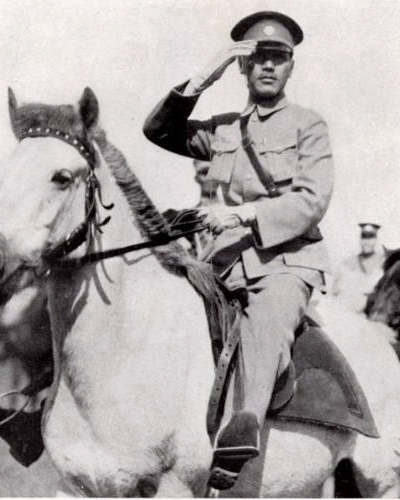
Generalissimo Chiang Kai-shek, commander-in-chief of the NRA, emerged from the Northern Expedition as the leader of the KMT and China.

In the 1920s, the Beiyang government based in Beijing was internationally recognised as the legitimate Chinese government. Much of the country, however, was not under its control, being ruled by a patchwork of warlords. The Kuomintang (KMT), based in Guangzhou (Canton), aspired to be the party of national liberation. Since the conclusion of the Constitutional Protection Movement in 1922, the KMT had been bolstering its ranks to prepare for an expedition against the northern warlords in Beijing, with the goal of reunifying China. This preparation involved improving both the political and military strength of the KMT. Before his death in March 1925, Sun Yat-sen, the founder of the Republic of China and co-founder of the KMT, was supportive of Sino-Soviet co-operation, which had involved forming the First United Front with the Chinese Communist Party (CCP). The military arm of the KMT was the National Revolutionary Army (NRA). Chiang Kai-shek, who had emerged as Sun's protégé as early as 1922, was appointed commandant of the Whampoa Military Academy in 1924, and quickly emerged as a contender for the position of Sun's successor in the aftermath of his death.

On 30 May 1925, Chinese students in Shanghai gathered at the International Settlement, and held demonstrations in opposition to foreign interference in China. Specifically, with the support of the KMT, they called for the boycott of foreign goods and an end to the Settlement, which was governed by the British and Americans. The Shanghai Municipal Police, largely operated by the British, opened fire on the crowd of demonstrators. This incident sparked outrage throughout China, culminating in the Canton–Hong Kong strike, which began on 18 June 1925, and proved a fertile recruiting ground for the CCP. Concerns about the rising power of the leftist faction and the effect of the strike on the Guangzhou government's ability to raise funds, which was largely dependent on foreign trade, led to increasing tensions within the United Front. Amidst this backdrop, Chiang, who had been vying for the position of KMT leader, began to consolidate power in preparation for an expedition against the northern warlords. On 20 March 1926, he launched a bloodless purge of hardline communists who were opposed to the proposed expedition from the Guangzhou administration and its military, known as the Canton Coup. At the same time, Chiang made conciliatory moves toward the Soviet Union, and attempted to balance the need for Soviet and CCP assistance in the fight against the warlords with his concerns about growing communist influence within the KMT. In the aftermath of the coup, Chiang negotiated a compromise whereby hardline members of the rightist faction, such as Wu Tiecheng, were removed from their posts in compensation for the purged leftists. By doing so, Chiang was able to prove his usefulness to the CCP and their Soviet sponsor, Joseph Stalin. Soviet aid to the KMT government would continue, as would co-operation with the CCP. A fragile coalition between KMT rightists, centrists led by Chiang, KMT leftists, and the CCP managed to hold together, laying the groundwork for the Northern Expedition.

Northern Expedition
- Traditional Chinese: 國民革命軍北伐
- Simplified Chinese: 国民革命军北伐
- Literal meaning: National Revolutionary Army northern expedition
Transcriptions
Standard Mandarin
- Hanyu Pinyin: Guómín gémìng jūn běifá
- Bopomofo: ㄍㄨㄛˊ ㄇㄧㄣˊ ㄍㄜˊ ㄇㄧㄥˋ ㄐㄩㄣ ㄅㄟˇ ㄈㄚˊ
- Wade–Giles: Kuomin komin chün peifa
Hakka
- Romanization: Koet-mìn kiet-min kiûn pet-phat
Yue: Cantonese
- Jyutping: Gwok^{3}man^{4} gaak^{3}ming^{6} gwan^{1} bak^{1}fat^{6}
Southern Min
- Hokkien POJ: Kok-bîn Kek-bēng-kun Pak-hoa̍t
- Tâi-lô: Kok-bîn Kik-bīng-kun Pak-hua̍t

In 1926, there were three major coalitions of warlords across China that were hostile to the KMT government in Guangzhou. The forces of Wu Peifu occupied the northern Hunan, Hubei, and Henan provinces. The coalition of Sun Chuanfang was in control of the Fujian, Zhejiang, Jiangsu, Anhui, and Jiangxi provinces. The most powerful coalition, led by Zhang Zuolin, then head of the Beiyang government and the Fengtian clique, was in control of Manchuria, Shandong, and Zhili. To face the Northern Expedition, Zhang Zuolin eventually assembled the "National Pacification Army" (Chinese: 安國軍; pinyin: Ānguójūn; Wade–Giles: Ankuochün; NPA), an alliance of the warlords of northern China.

== First phase (July 1926–April 1927) ==
=== Against Wu Peifu (July–September 1926) ===
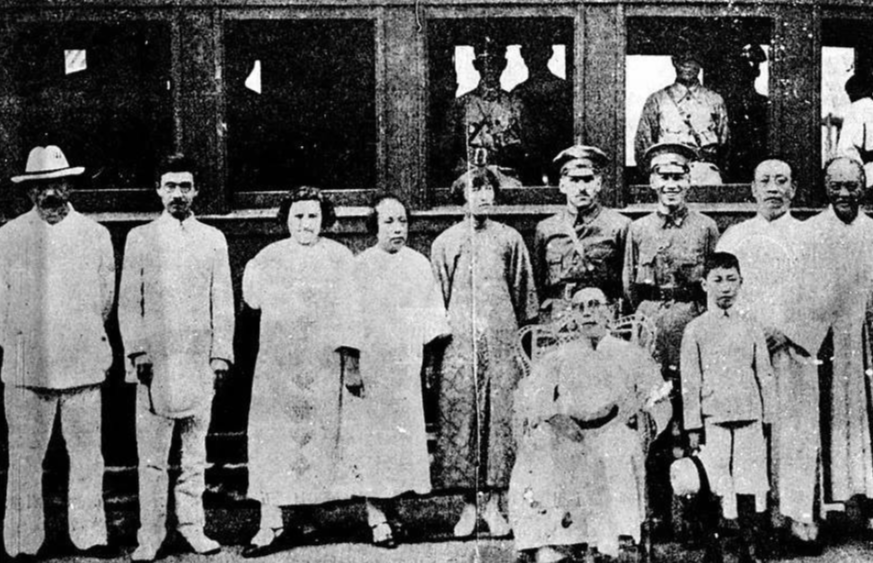
Chiang Kai-shek prepares to leave Guangzhou. Those pictured include Mikhail Borodin, on the far left, Vasily Blyukher in military uniform on the right, and Chiang himself in uniform, to the right of Blyukher.

Amidst heavy fighting along the border between KMT-held territory and that of the recently allied forces of the Fengtian and Zhili cliques, the nationalist government appointed Chiang Kai-shek commander-in-chief of the NRA on 5 June 1926. Chiang would accept this post in a ceremony on 9 July, which marked the formal start of the Northern Expedition, although military clashes had already been ongoing. The initial strategy for the KMT's northern advance against the Zhili warlords, which was largely devised by Soviet advisors Mikhail Borodin and Vasily Blyukher, was to focus on defeating Wu Peifu and appeasing Sun Chuanfang, while ignoring Zhang Zuolin of the Fengtian clique. Having switched from a defensive to offensive posture, KMT forces quickly advanced from their base in Guangdong into Wu-controlled Hunan province, capturing Changsha on 11 July. At the time, most of Wu Peifu's forces were preoccupied with fighting at Nankou Pass, near Beijing, against the Guominjun, a breakaway Zhili faction sympathetic to the KMT. Sun Chuanfang, who the KMT had avoided antagonising, did not intervene as KMT troops advanced further into Wu's territory. Whilst the Fengtian clique had offered its support to Wu, he refused their aid, fearing that the northern warlords would undermine his position if he allowed their troops into his territory. At a military conference held in Changsha on 11–12 August 1926, the KMT decided to launch a direct assault on Wu's stronghold of Wuchang, bypassing Sun's Nanchang. In this manner, they would follow the route taken by the Taiping Rebellion in the 19th century. In an address to his generals at the same conference, Chiang proclaimed:

"The importance of this fight is not only in that it will decide the fate of the warlords. But, whether or not the Chinese nation and race can restore their freedom and independence hangs in the balance. In other words, it is a struggle between the nation and the warlords, between the revolution and the anti-revolutionaries, between the Three People's Principles and imperialism. All are to be decided now in this time of battle … so as to restore independence and freedom to our Chinese race".

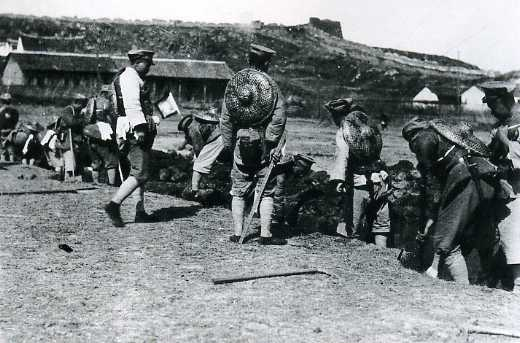
NRA troops preparing to attack Wuchang (present-day Wuhan)

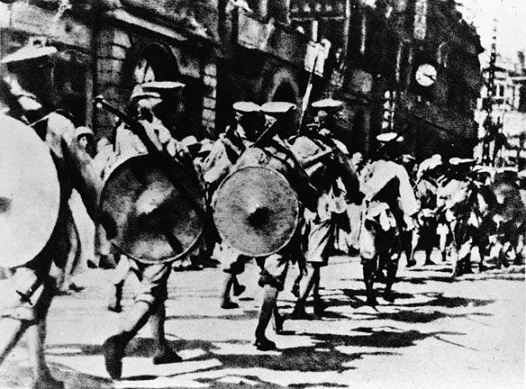
NRA forces enter the British concession at Hankou, October 1926

With the capture of the Yangtze port of Yuezhou on 22 August 1926, Hunan came under complete KMT control, paving the way for an advance to Wuchang along the route of the Beijing–Guangzhou railway. As Wu Peifu's forces retreated northward, they breached several Yangtze dikes, slowing the KMT push. By 28 August, the KMT, led by Li Zongren and his Guangxi NRA Seventh Army, had taken Xianning, about 75 kilometres (47 mi) south of Wuchang. Wu Peifu, who had returned south to mount a defence of Wuchang, gathered his forces at Heshengqiao Bridge. On 29 August, he launched a counterattack against KMT forces to the south, compromising his defensive line, and by noon the next day, his forces were in general retreat toward Wuchang. In this short period of time, Wu lost 8,000 troops. At least 5,000 of these were taken prisoner, along with their rifles, providing a boost to KMT forces. By 2 September, the NRA had nearly surrounded Wuchang. Whilst Wu and most of his army fled north to Henan province, his remaining troops in the walled city held out for over a month, until it was taken on October 10. His failure in the face of the NRA, however, left his hold on power and reputation broken. What remained of his army would disintegrate in the following months.

=== Against Sun Chuanfang (September 1926–February 1927) ===
With Wu Peifu's forces in retreat, the NRA directed itself toward Sun Chuanfang-controlled Jiangxi province, namely the city of Jiujiang and the provincial capital, Nanchang. Whilst Sun had been offered a non-aggression pact by the Guangzhou government, he was not willing to subordinate his administration to KMT rule. Consequently, whilst the siege in Wuchang was still ongoing, Chiang Kai-shek launched an attack across the Jiangxi border on 4 September 1926. By 19 September, both Jiujiang and Nanchang had come under KMT control, hastened by the defection of Lai Shih-huang, one of Sun's generals. Despite these successes, the NRA offensive was forced into retreat as Sun arrived from Nanjing with reinforcements on 21 September. Sun retook most of the territory he had lost, brutally reasserting his authority by killing hundreds of students, teachers, and suspected members of the KMT, whose severed heads he displayed on spikes in public places.

Routes of the Northern Expedition

With the Northern Expedition's advance halted, Chiang wired the government in Guangzhou, demanding an end to the still ongoing Canton–Hong Kong strike, which continued to hamper his supply chain. Negotiations with the British began on 23 September 1926, with the strike finally called off on 10 October. This eased access to supplies for the NRA, and freed up manpower, in the form of the strikers, for the continued push north. On the same day, Wu Peifu's remaining forces at Wuchang surrendered, completing the NRA's conquest of Hubei province. As bloody fighting continued in Jiangxi, the civil governor of Zhejiang province, Xia Chao, one of Sun's subordinates, defected to the KMT government in Guangzhou. Zhejiang inhabitants had become increasingly dissatisfied with the rule of Sun, who was foreign to the province, and on 16 October 1926, Xia declared the independence of Zhejiang. Chiang Kai-shek, a native of Zhejiang, was able to convince Xia to side with the KMT. Following his defection, Xia launched an attack on Sun-controlled Shanghai, but was almost immediately forced to withdraw back to Zhejiang; Sun had detected Xia's plans days earlier. Sun's forces subsequently marched on Zhejiang, crushing the rebellion by 23 October. Xia was executed, along with hundreds of his troops, while thousands of civilians were massacred at Xia's former headquarters.

Alongside the Zhejiang rebellion, the NRA had continued their offensive in Jiangxi. Adding to the pressure on Sun, the Shantou-based NRA First Army, led by He Yingqin, marched across the Guangdong border, and began a new offensive into Fujian province. NRA troops were welcomed by many locals, including the Hakka, who resented foreign control, and gradually began to infiltrate the Fujian countryside. He's forces moved up the coast, pushing toward the provincial capital, Fuzhou. By the end of October, Sun's forces were again in retreat across Jiangxi and Fujian. In early November, KMT troops moved to capture the Yangtze ports of Jiujiang and Hukou, and by 9 November 1926, retook control of Nanchang. Sun's forces abandoned substantial materiel as they retreated, bolstering the poorly armed NRA, which suffered 20,000 casualties in the final push on Nanchang alone. Concurrently, Sun himself had left for Tianjin with the aim of seeking aid from the powerful Fengtian clique. Shandong warlord Zhang Zongchang and Manchurian warlord Zhang Zuolin offered assistance, agreeing that it was necessary to contain the NRA, though they demanded payment in return for their help. As the NRA offensive carved its way through Fujian, 60,000 troops from Shandong arrived in Sun-controlled Anhui province on 24 November. These were organised into the "National Pacification Army" (NPA) on 1 December 1926. Zhang Zuolin took the position of commander-in-chief, with Zhang Zongchang and Sun Chuanfang as deputy commanders.

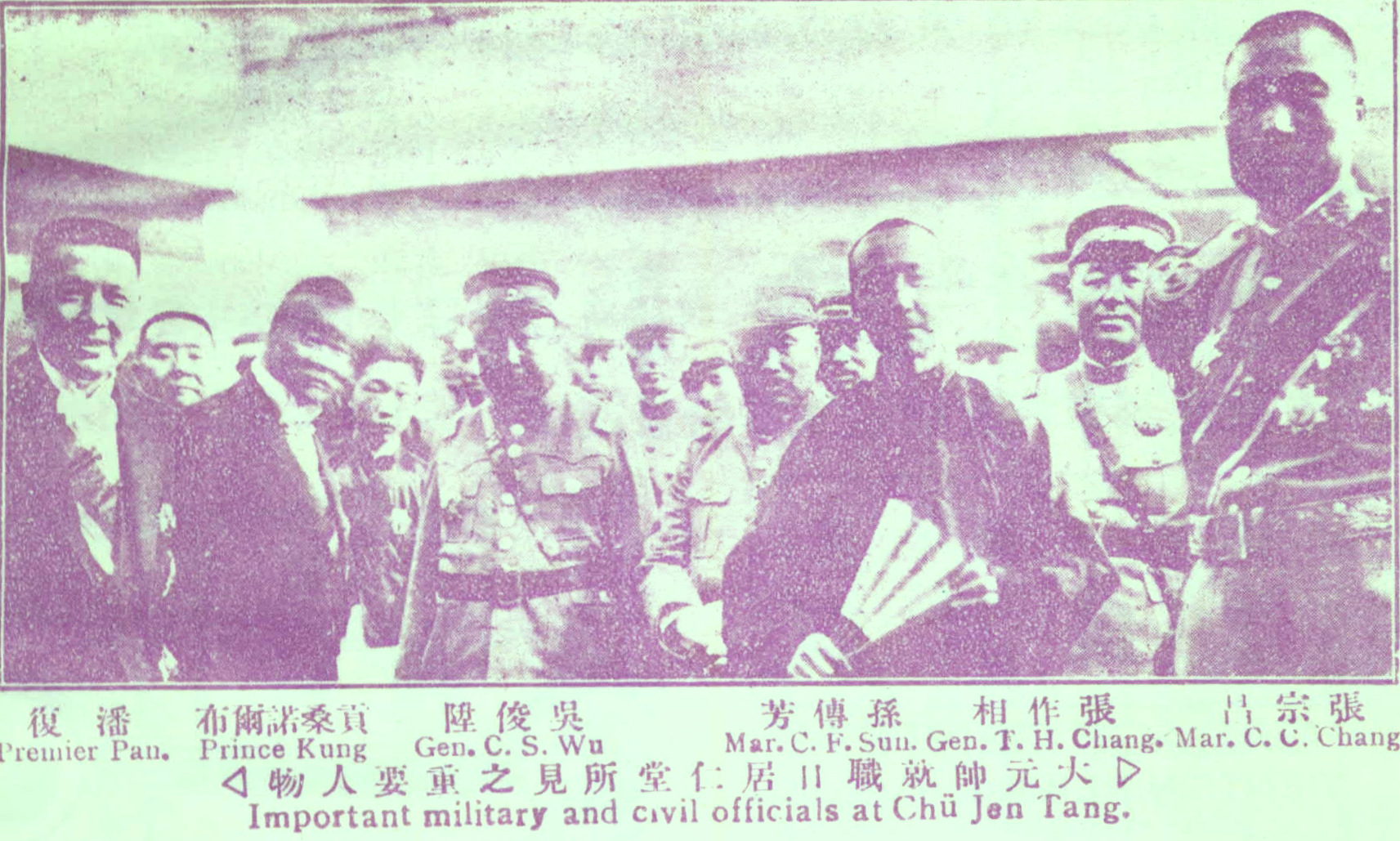
Members of the National Pacification military government, from left to right: Pan Fu, Gungsangnorbu, Wu Junsheng, Sun Chuanfang, Zhang Zuoxiang, and Zhang Zongchang

This alliance was hugely unpopular with locals in the regions under Sun's control, with Zhang Zhongchang's northern troops viewed as invaders. The Zhejiang autonomy movement continued, and a meeting of influential provincial figures, nominally loyal to Sun, was held in Shanghai on 8 December. In Fujian, many of Sun's troops had already defected to the NRA, and on 9 December, He Yingqin's army entered Fuzhou unopposed. On 11 December 1926, Zhejiang commander Zhou Fengqi announced his defection to the NRA. This started a cascade of defections, leading to Zhejiang's secession from Sun's "United Provinces", after which it was given autonomous status by the Guangzhou government. In response, Sun rallied his army on the Zhejiang border, with the NPA protecting his rear, and charged into Zhejiang, retaking most of the province. By 10 January, the majority of the Zhejiang rebel forces had retreated to Quzhou. To relieve the besieged rebels, He Yingqin pushed his Fujian-based forces into Zhejiang, halting Sun's advance. The rebel and KMT forces merged under the command of Bai Chongxi, who launched a counteroffensive on 20 January 1927. By 29 January, the offensive had reached Lanxi and Jinhua, where a fierce battle resulted in a catastrophic defeat for Sun's forces. Following this victory, the NRA launched a pincer attack on the provincial capital Hangzhou. Many of Sun's northern troops, demoralised by defeat, broke ranks and streamed north, looting the towns and villages they passed along the way. With his forces in disarray, Sun's commander in the area, Meng Chao-yueh, decided on 17 February to abandon Hangzhou and flee with his 20,000 troops by train to Jiangsu province. By 23 February 1927, Zhejiang was under complete KMT control. In six months, the nationalists had expanded their control to seven provinces, inhabited by a population of about 170 million people. Aided by the defection of numerous warlords and their armies, by this point, the NRA had bolstered its ranks to 700,000.

=== Shanghai–Nanjing offensive (February–April 1927) ===
Sun Chuanfang retreated to Nanjing in the aftermath of these setbacks. The Fengtian clique responded to Sun's plea for help by reinforcing Jiangsu and Anhui provinces, while increasing the number of troops in Henan in support of Wu Peifu. Two major Fengtian formations, the Shandong Army of Zhang Zongchang and the Zhili Army of Chu Yupu, crossed the Yangtze River in February 1927 to help Sun defend Nanjing and Shanghai. Following their victory in Zhejiang, Chiang Kai-shek ordered the launch of an offensive on those two cities. The Hangzhou-based eastern NRA, led by Bai Chongxi and He Yingqin, launched a two-pronged attack in mid-March. Bai's forces advanced toward Shanghai, whilst He's forces moved toward Changzhou, with the goal of severing Sun's lifeline, the Shanghai–Nanjing railway. Meanwhile, Cheng Qian's central NRA advanced toward Nanjing through Anhui province, its path opened by the defection of Sun's forces there. The remnants of Sun's forces, supported by the Shandong Army, were forced to withdraw to Shanghai proper in the face of Bai's army. He's forces quickly severed the railway link with Shanghai, while Sun was confronted with the defection of his navy, and a communist general strike in Shanghai. Intense fighting took place at Songjiang, just outside the city, but on 22 March 1927, Bai's forces marched into Shanghai victorious. The Fengtian support operation had proven to be a "costly operational disaster" for the northern warlords, whose armies had suffered heavy casualties, forcing them to retreat north across the Yangtze. Meanwhile, the strike continued until 24 March, when Bai ordered its end. The general disorder caused by the strike is said to have resulted in the deaths of 322 people, with 2,000 wounded, contributing to KMT feelings of unease with its wayward communist allies.

With Shanghai under their control, the NRA turned its attention to Nanjing. He Yingqin advanced from the south-east, whilst Cheng Qian came from the south-west. Zhang Zongchang ordered his Shandong Army to withdraw from Nanjing on 23 March 1927, leaving the city undefended. Cheng arrived the next day, entering the city with no resistance. Almost immediately after arrival of the NRA, mass anti-foreigner riots broke out in the city, in an event that came to be known as the Nanjing Incident. British and American naval forces were sent to evacuate their respective citizens, resulting in a naval bombardment that left the city burning and at least forty people dead. He's forces arrived on 25 March, and on the next day, Cheng and He were finally able to put an end to the violence.

Chiang Kai-shek's faction accused Lin Boqu of planning the unrest, viewing it as an attempt to turn international opinion against the KMT. Lin, a member of both the CCP and the KMT, had been serving as political commissar of the Sixth Army, part of Cheng Qian's forces. Whoever was responsible, the Nanjing Incident represented the culmination of tensions within the First United Front. The nationalist government had moved from Guangzhou to the new city of Wuhan, which was formed from a merger of Wuchang and two other nearby cities. The Wuhan administration gradually drifted away from Chiang, becoming a centre of leftist, Soviet-backed power within the KMT and constraining his authority. Communist-led trade unions staged near-constant demonstrations in Wuhan itself, and across the nominally KMT-controlled territories, establishing parallel structures of administration in areas liberated by the NRA.

In the final success of the first phase of the expedition, the NRA went on to capture the Anhui provincial capital of Hefei and the smaller city of Bengbu. NRA forces that had already been operating north of the Yangtze continued into northern Jiangsu province. Their advance, however, was hampered by the administrative chaos that followed the Nanjing Incident. Tensions between the leftists in Wuhan and rightists in Nanjing would come to a head, bringing the Northern Expedition to a halt. Meanwhile, in the aftermath of the Shanghai–Nanjing offensive, the aid of the Fengtian armies prevented Sun Chuanfang's army from collapsing completely, and they eventually managed to regroup and strengthen their forces for the next phase of the conflict. Launching a counteroffensive on 3 April 1927, the NPA had been able to force the NRA back more than 161 kilometres (100 mi) to the Yangtze by 11 April.

== Anti-communist purge and second phase (April 1927–June 1928) ==
=== Internal conflict among the nationalists (April–August 1927) ===
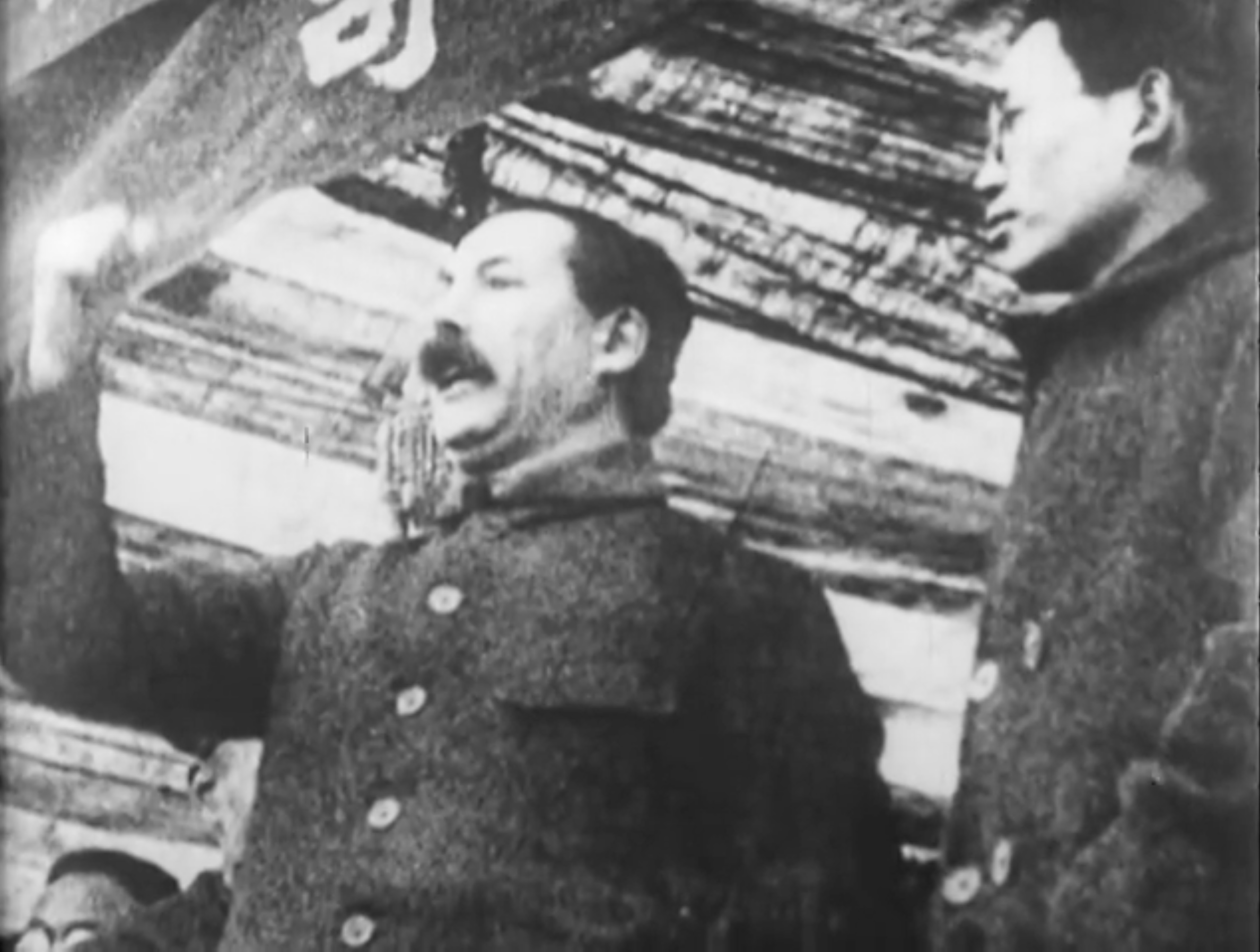
Mikhail Borodin making a speech in Wuhan, 1927

As part of the First United Front, many members of the Chinese Communist Party had joined the KMT, and they exerted significant influence over its left-wing faction. Mikhail Borodin, the official liaison between the KMT and the Soviet government in Moscow, had spent years cultivating this alliance, while covertly encouraging CCP expansion. This Soviet-backed leftist wing of the KMT came to dominate the nationalist government in Wuhan, which increasingly directed its ire at NRA commander-in-chief Chiang Kai-shek. On 1 April 1927, the Wuhan government, advised by Borodin, issued edicts stripping Chiang of his authority in foreign affairs, financial matters, and communications, and ordered that he leave his command post in Shanghai and go to the front. These orders had no effect, as Wuhan had almost no military authority. The government intended to send a small force to Nanjing with the aim of "disarming" Chiang, but put that plan on hold following Wang Jingwei's return from exile in Europe. Wang, who had travelled back to China at the urging of members of the government, was greeted in Shanghai by Chiang, who offered a power-sharing deal. Wang said that he would consider the deal, and boarded a ship for Wuhan on 7 April. He arrived on the 10th, where he was eagerly greeted by the Wuhan leadership. Having heard from Wang about Chiang's offer, the government decided to turn its limited forces toward Beijing instead. Chiang, on the other hand, was already preparing for a purge of communists in Shanghai.

Between 12 and 14 April, hundreds of communists in Shanghai were arrested and killed on the orders of Chiang in a disturbance that came to be called the "Shanghai massacre", effectively ending the alliance between the nationalists and the communists. Chiang engaged the Green Gang underworld group to kill all trade unionists and communists within the city. The purge was condemned by the Wang Jingwei, now leader of the Wuhan government, formalising the split between the KMT leftists based in Wuhan and the KMT rightists, who subsequently established their own government in Nanjing. The precariousness of the NRA position in Nanjing was clear: at ceremonies held to commemorate the city's elevation to capital of China, warlord Zhang Zongchang's artillery bombarded the city's waterfront from across the Yangtze.

With the Nanjing–Shanghai area under constant threat of attack from the NPA, a series of independent offensives was launched by NRA and NRA-aligned forces in May 1927. Feng Yuxiang and his Guominjun moved first, leaving their base in Shaanxi to march on Luoyang, in Henan. On 10 May 1927, the NRA First and Sixth armies crossed the Yangtze into Anhui, and on 16 May, Li Zongren, based in western Anhui, led the Seventh Army toward Hefei. Concurrently, the Wuhan government launched its own campaign in Henan province led by Tang Shengzhi, who was appointed to serve as the Wuhan army's commander-in-chief. Aided by the defection of remnants of Wu Peifu's forces, Tang advanced to fight the forces of the "Young Marshal" Zhang Xueliang, Zhang Zuolin's son and heir, pushing them back to a river at Yancheng.

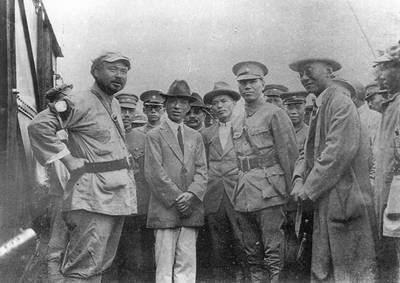
Feng Yuxiang meets with Chiang Kai-shek in Xuzhou on 19 June 1927

By 20 May, Li had captured Bengbu, whilst Chiang unleashed a four-pronged attack through Jiangsu, toward the warlord power base in Shandong. He Yingqin led the NRA First Army across the Yangtze at Zhenjiang, and moved to capture Haizhou. On 28 May, Li took Suzhou, while the Guominjun took Luoyang, forcing Zhang Zongchang to withdraw his forces to Shandong, and Zhang Xueliang to fall back north of the Yellow River. Following Xueliang's retreat, Feng Yuxiang moved east from Luoyang to Zhengzhou. Finally, on 2 June 1927, the NRA captured the vital railway junction of Xuzhou. With both the Longhai and Beijing–Hankou railways under NRA or Guominjun control, Feng came into direct contact with the Wuhan and Nanjing factional governments, who both sought his aid. He met with Wang Jingwei and Tang Shengzhi at Zhengzhou on 10–11 June, then travelled to Xuzhou to meet with Chiang Kai-shek on 19 June. On the next day, Feng announced that he would align with the Nanjing faction and purge communists from the areas under his control, crippling the Wuhan government's plan to push north, upon which Tang returned to Wuhan with his troops. Whilst Chiang intended to push into Shandong, he was thwarted by the arrival of the Japanese Kwantung Army during the course of June, who were ostensibly deployed to protect Japanese citizens in Qingdao. Around this time, Wu Peifu retreated with his remaining forces into Sichuan, where he announced his retirement. On 5 July, NPA general Chen Yi-yen defected to the NRA, but failed to convince his 10,000 soldiers at Qingdao to do likewise.

At Wuhan, Tang Shengzhi began to mobilise his troops for an attack on the Nanjing government. Aware of this threat, Chiang recalled troops from the Shandong border in an effort to block Tang. In turn, the NPA launched an attack on Chiang in early July, reclaiming much of the territory they had lost. By 24 July 1927, the NPA had retaken Xuzhou. In the face of mounting losses inflicted by the warlords, the Wuhan and Nanjing factions began reconciliation talks. The Wuhan government purged communists from its ranks and expelled Soviet advisors, facilitating a rapprochement between the two factions, but also sparking the communist Nanchang uprising, which weakened its authority. In the meantime, however, the NPA counter-offensive continued, reaching Bengbu on 9 August, and forcing Chiang to withdraw his troops south of the Yangtze. In return for his co-operation, Wang Jingwei demanded that Chiang resign from his post of commander-in-chief, and relinquish all political titles. Accordingly, Chiang resigned from his post on 12 August 1927, though this did not immediately reunify the Wuhan and Nanjing factions.

=== Without Chiang Kai-shek (August 1927–January 1928) ===
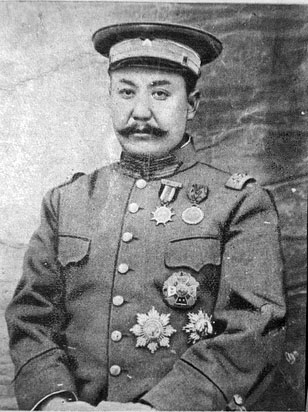
Shanxi warlord Yan Xishan started to fight the NPA in October 1927, strengthening the KMT military position

As the two sides attempted to reconcile their political differences, Sun Chuanfang's forces continued to bombard Nanjing from across the Yangtze. Sensing the NRA's continual disarray, Sun moved to try and recapture Shanghai, contrary to the wishes of NPA leader Zhang Zuolin. On 25 August, NPA landing parties were dispatched to cross the Yangtze at Longtan, near Nanjing. In the early morning of 26 August 1927, thousands of Sun's troops crossed the river, rallying at the Longtan station of the Shanghai–Nanjing railway. Li Zongren's NRA Seventh Army managed to drive the NPA away from the railway briefly, but thousands more of Sun's troops, including White Russian mercenary units, crossed the river the next day and retook the station, cutting off contact between Nanjing and Shanghai. The reeling NRA sent missives to all factions within the revolutionary movement, calling for unity in the face of Sun's advancing troops. Accordingly, in an attempt to put pressure on Sun, Feng Yuxiang and his Guominjun launched an attack into Shandong on 28 August, while Wuhan sent its troops north, trying to flank Sun, and He Yingqin approached from Shanghai. With its forces encircled, and unable to continue to move troops across the river, the NPA was forced to abandon Longtan railway station on 30 August. In a desperate attempt at resistance, Sun rallied his 40,000 remaining troops and launched a counter-offensive on 31 August, only to be crushed in a hard-fought battle that left more than 10,000 of those troops dead. While Sun was able to escape to Shandong, his surviving troops were forced to surrender to the NRA.

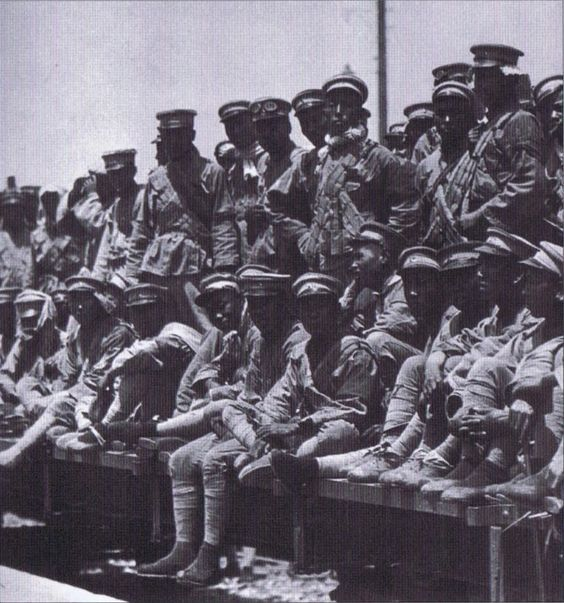
Beiyang warlord soldiers retreating by railway

With victory in hand, reconciliation talks restarted on 7 September, and on 15 September, the Wuhan government was dissolved, with a new joint government established in Nanjing, under the leadership of Guangxi clique generals. Wang Jingwei refused to join the new government, as did Tang Shengzi, who became an independent warlord in his own right, controlling Hubei, Hunan, Jiangxi, and parts of Anhui. On the other hand, Shanxi warlord Yan Xishan, theretofore independent, aligned his province with the Nanjing government, adding 100,000 troops to NRA ranks and increasing the pressure on Zhang Zuolin. In the subsequent fighting, neither the Shanxi nor Fengtian forces managed to gain the upper hand. Yan's troops successfully withstood a massive siege at Zhuozhou, but went on to suffer a heavy defeat at Baoding on 15 October 1927. The threat from Tang's forces, however, prejudiced any further northward advance by the NRA, and so in October, it moved to quash his rebellion. Tang was defeated in early November, and left for exile in Japan shortly afterwards. With Tang dealt with, the push north resumed, reaching Bengbu by 9 November. Continuing their advance, the NRA and Feng Yuxiang's Guominjun moved toward Xuzhou. The NPA attempted a counter-offensive on 12 December, led by armoured trains, but was quickly forced back by the combined NRA and Guominjun forces, which took Xuzhou on 16 December. The NPA retreated once more to Shandong.

Meanwhile, in Guangzhou, a communist uprising broke out on 11 December 1927. The violent rebellion was quickly put down, and on 13 December, Chiang Kai-shek called for the ending of all remaining relations with the Soviet Union. The Nanjing government agreed, and also aired its suspicions over the allegiances of Wang Jingwei, who had been based in Guangzhou after the end of the Wuhan government. Wang left for exile in France on 17 December, paving the way for Chiang's return as commander-in-chief. With the military success of Chiang's Whampoa troops, the various KMT factions agreed to recognise the legitimacy of Chiang's leadership. Consequently, Chiang was officially invited to resume command of the NRA on 1 January 1928.

=== Regrouping and Jinan incident (January–May 1928) ===
With the frigid winter of northern China prohibiting any further advance, Chiang used the months following his reappointment to consolidate his control and restore the integrity of the Nanjing administration. On 18 February 1928, Chiang was granted the title "Commander-in-Chief of the Northern Expeditionary Forces", whilst He Yingqin was made NRA chief-of-staff. The NRA was reorganised into four "collective armies". The First Collective Army was made up largely of the original NRA forces from Guangzhou, now based in the Nanjing–Shanghai area. The Second Collective Army consisted of Feng's Guominjun, the Third of Yan's Shanxi forces, and the Fourth of Li Zongren's Guangxi clique army. By this point, the NRA was made up of one million soldiers, most of them part of ex-warlord armies. Preparing for a resumption of the expedition in March, Chiang ordered his foreign ministry to negotiate with the Japanese, in order to try to prevent their further intervention in Shandong.

By 1 April 1928, Feng's NRA Second Collective Army (Guominjun) and Yan's NRA Third Collective Army had started to fight the NPA on the Henan–Shandong border and along the Beijing–Suiyuan railway. The resumption of the Northern Expedition was officially launched by Chiang Kai-shek on 7 April. With the NPA line softened by Feng and Yan's attacks, the NRA First Collective Army rushed into Shandong along the Tianjin–Pukou railway, capturing Tengzhou by 16 April. Meanwhile, Feng's forces advanced into Shandong from the west, capturing Jiaxiang on the 15th. Sun Chuanfang decided to attempt a two-pronged counter-offensive against the NRA First and Second armies, managing to push the First back to the Longhai railway. His attack against the Second Army failed, and by the 21st, the combined NRA had forced him to withdraw from Jining to the provincial capital Jinan. According to an American account of Sun's retreat, the "great majority of the troops in this retreat literally walked the soles off their shoes, and this, combined with the scarcity of food and total lack of shelter left the vast horde without any idea of further resistance". The Japanese, meanwhile, having heard of Sun's defeat, began to move Kwantung Army troops by train from Qingdao to Jinan.

While the NRA Second Collective Army advanced northeast to Jinan along the southern bank of the Yellow River, the First Collective Army diverged east from the Tianjin–Pukou railway at Tai'an, crossing the Taishan mountains to attack Jinan from the west via the Qingdao–Jinan railway. This strategy was successful, and by 29 April 1928, the NRA had nearly encircled Jinan. The beleaguered NPA retreated to the north bank of the Yellow River, amidst looting and outbreaks of violence. At this point, there were already 3,000 Japanese troops in Jinan, guarding the 2,000 Japanese civilians in the city. On the next day, NRA troops entered Jinan. Chiang Kai-shek arrived on 2 May 1928, and attempted to negotiate a Japanese withdrawal from Jinan, issuing safety guarantees for Japanese civilians to local Kwantung Army commander Hikosuke Fukuda. Fukuda agreed, and his troops prepared to leave that night. Early the next morning, conflict broke out between the Chinese and Japanese troops, starting what came to be called the "Jinan incident". What began as a minor armed altercation escalated on 8 May into a full-scale Japanese attack on the city. During the course of the incident, the Japanese killed KMT foreign affairs commissioner Cai Gongshi, several diplomats, and about five thousand Chinese civilians.

=== Final offensive and capture of Beijing (May–December 1928) ===
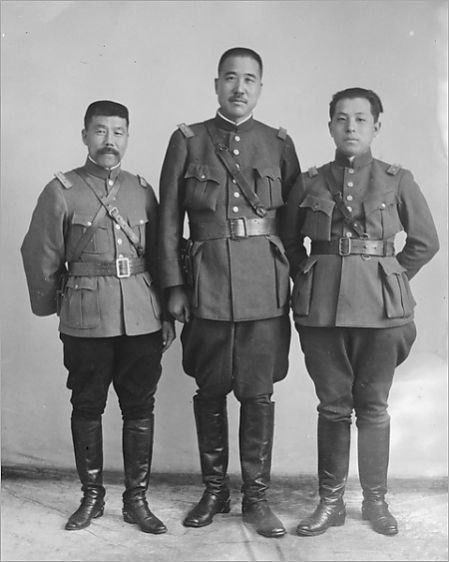
When Zhang Xueliang (right) decided to make peace with the nationalist government, his former subordinates Zhang Zongchang (middle) and Chu Yupu (left) unsuccessfully attempted to overthrow him.

Deciding to avoid further confrontation with the Japanese, the NRA First Army continued its march north by going around Jinan to capture Dezhou on 13 May 1928, while the NRA Second Army moved north along the Beijing–Hankou railway. Meanwhile, Yan Xishan's NRA Third Army proceeded toward Beijing from its base in Shanxi. The Second and Third armies met at Baoding on the North China Plain. While the Second Army besieged that city, the Third Army went north toward Zhangjiakou, gateway to Beijing. On 17 May, however, the forces of Zhang Zuolin launched a 200,000-man counter-offensive, forcing the First Army back and the Second Army 48 kilometres (30 mi) south of Baoding. As fighting grew closer to Beijing, the Japanese sent a communique to both the NRA and Zhang, warning that any fighting in Manchuria would result in a Japanese intervention in that region. Zhang, weary of KMT propaganda that linked him with the Japanese massacre at Jinan, responded that he would "not recognize Japan's interest in Manchuria", compromising his position. With his troops demoralised, the momentum of the NPA counter-offensive fizzled out by 25 May, and the Third Army was able to capture Zhangjiakou on that day, and Nankou Pass on the next. With pressure growing on his vital railway links, Zhang gradually began to withdraw his troops from the North China Plain on 30 May. In the face of the NRA onslaught, and under pressure from the Japanese, Zhang decided to evacuate to Manchuria by train, leaving with his staff on 3 June. Early the next morning, on 4 June 1928, a bomb planted by the Japanese Kwantung Army exploded under the train, killing Zhang in the so-called "Huanggutun incident". His remaining forces, even further demoralised, crumpled under the pressure of the NRA advance. Sun Chuanfang unleashed the final blow to the NPA when he withdrew his troops from the defensive line and fled to Japanese-controlled Dairen on 4 June. On 6 June, the NRA Third Collective Army marched into Beijing, ending the Beiyang government. The other NRA armies would arrive in the Beijing area over the next few days. Zhang Zongchang subordinate Xu Yuanquan subsequently surrendered Tianjin to the NRA First Collective Army on 11 June.

Zhang Xueliang succeeded Zhang Zuolin as leader of the Fengtian clique, and decided to end the war and to co-operate with the nationalists. The Shandong–Zhili Army led by Zhang Zongchang and Chu Yupu refused to surrender, and despite the defeats it had suffered still numbered about 60,000–70,000 soldiers, as well as at least three armoured trains manned by White Russian mercenaries under General Konstantin Nechaev. As Zhang Xueliang had sided with the nationalists, Zhang Zongchang declared war on the Fengtian clique. Supported by Japan, the Shandong–Zhili Army moved from its base at Tangshan on 2 August 1928, crossed the Luan River, and invaded Manchuria. After six days of fighting, however, the defiant warlord army was trapped by KMT and Zhang Xueliang–aligned forces; many of Zhang Zongchang's troops (including the White Russian mercenaries) defected or deserted, and those who refused to surrender were killed. Zhang Xueliang officially declared his allegiance to the nationalist government in Nanjing on 29 December 1928, marking the formal end of the Northern Expedition, and the reunification of China.

== Aftermath ==
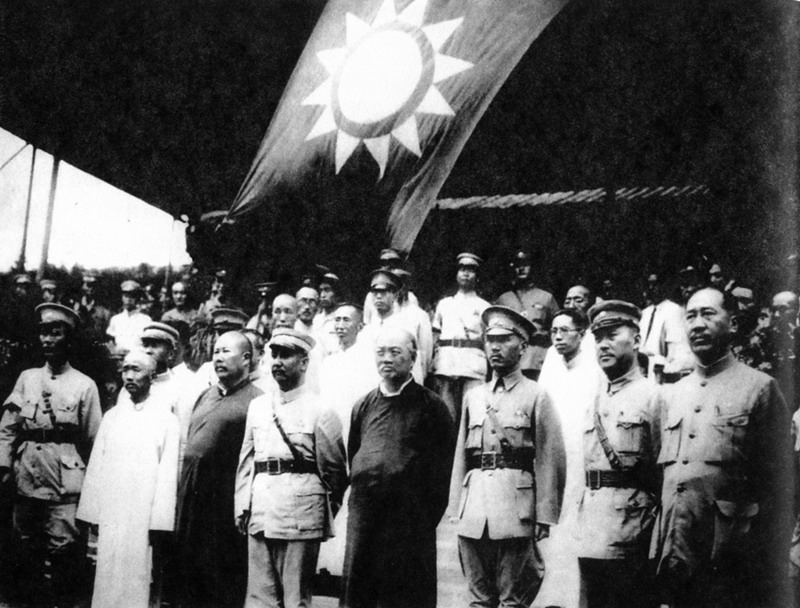
The leaders of the Northern Expedition gather on 6 July 1928, at Sun Yat-sen's mausoleum in the Temple of Azure Clouds, Beijing, to commemorate the completion of their mission.

Following the capture of Beijing, Chiang and his administration moved quickly to reorganise the government for peacetime. In July, he and the leaders of the four collective armies met at Beijing to discuss the demobilisation and disarmament of the roughly 2.2 million troops that had come to be part of the NRA. Chiang desired to reduce the size of the army by half, so as to free up government monies for domestic development. The lack of unity in the new administration quickly became apparent, and on 14 July 1928, Feng Yuxiang left Beijing. A general meeting of the KMT was held in Nanjing from 8–14 August. At this meeting, also attended by non-KMT members Feng and Yan Xishan, the primary topic of discussion was that of centralisation. Chiang desired to take the power that had been executed through various provincial entities and concentrate it in the central government, in an effort to curtail the provincialist tendencies of the warlord era. Minister of Finance T. V. Soong called for all revenues to be centralised in the national treasury. In the end, though, it was recognised that real centralisation could only occur if the various commanders, the former warlords, relinquished their financial and military power to the national government. While these principles were nominally agreed to by the KMT membership, their exercise in practice was far from assured.

The new peacetime Nanjing government was launched on 10 October 1928, the seventeenth anniversary of the start of the Xinhai Revolution, with Chiang at its head. The country, however, remained de facto divided into five realms controlled by military leaders. The Nanjing faction controlled the area around Nanjing and Shanghai, while the Guangxi clique controlled Hubei, Hunan, and Guangxi. Feng Yuxiang's Guominjun continued to control Shaanxi, Henan, and parts of Shantung and Zhili, while Yan Xishan controlled Shanxi, Beijing, and the area around Tianjin. Zhang Xueliang continued to control Manchuria as a quasi-independent state, and local warlords in Sichuan, Yunnan, and Guizhou remained as they were before the Northern Expedition.

Defeated warlord Zhang Zongchang would return to his former territory of Shandong in 1929, where he launched a rebellion against his former subordinate Liu Zhennian, who had defected to the nationalists during the Northern Expedition. While the rebellion was put down swiftly, it demonstrated the Nanjing government's shaky hold on China's vast territory. As Chiang attempted to cut back the military and centralise the power of the nationalist government in Nanjing, the regional warlords, with their military forces largely intact, began to renounce their allegiance to Chiang and form an alliance against the KMT. This struggle for supremacy broke into armed conflict in the Central Plains War of 1929–30. Although Chiang was ultimately victorious in that war, which ensured his status as the singular leader of all China, regionalism and warlordism would continue, weakening the country and laying the groundwork for the Second Sino-Japanese War and the Chinese Civil War.

=== In the Soviet Union ===
The Northern Expedition became a point of contention between Joseph Stalin and Leon Trotsky in the Soviet Union. Stalin encouraged the CCP to co-operate with the KMT on multiple occasions, as he believed the KMT was more capable of completing a revolution. Trotsky was against collaboration with the KMT, as he believed that it was opposed to the concept of proletarian revolution. The Comintern backed Stalin's decision to financially support the KMT. Stalin, who in his China strategy prohibited the arming of workers and peasants, and encouraged co-operation with the bourgeoisie, was considered vulnerable in the aftermath of the failure of the first United Front. This failure crystallised his move away from international revolution and toward "Socialism in One Country". Stalin would never again trust the Chinese Communist Party, which he would later refer to as "margarine communists" who deviated from Marxist orthodoxy in their drive for peasant-based (land reform), rather than worker-based, revolution.
