= He Zhuguo =

Chinese general (1897–1985)

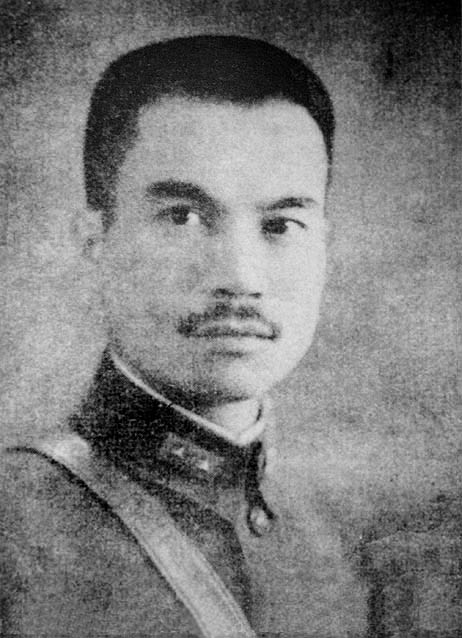
- He Zhuguo (1897-1985)
- Born: 1897; Yulin, Guangxi
- Died: September 3, 1985 (aged 87–88) Beijing
- Allegiance: Beiyang government Republic of China; People's Republic of China (after 1949)
- Branch: Fengtian Army; National Revolutionary Army
- Service years: 1917–1948
- Rank: lieutenant general
- Conflicts: Zhili-Fengtian War; Second Sino-Japanese War; Defense of the Great Wall; Battle of Taiyuan; Battle of Xinkou; Second Battle of Changsha; Battle of Central Henan

He Zhuguo (simplified Chinese: 何柱国; traditional Chinese: 何柱國; pinyin: Hé Zhùguó; Wade–Giles: Ho^{2} Chu^{4}-kuo^{2}; 1897– September 3, 1985) was a Chinese general from Rong County, Guangxi, who served in the Fengtian Army and later the National Revolutionary Army. He was a member of the Hakka ethnicity. As a commander of a cavalry force under Zhang Xueliang, he escaped assassination by KMT radicals during the Xi'an Incident by the help of Yang Hucheng. In the People's Republic of China, he is celebrated by the Revolutionary Committee of the Kuomintang for his participation in the Second United Front between the KMT and the Chinese Communist Party against Japanese invaders during the Second Sino-Japanese War.

== Biography ==
=== Early life and education ===
He Zhuoguo was born in Yangmei Ruin, Nanxiang, Rong County, Guangxi, and lost his father since childhood. Enrolled in private school at 7 years old. At the age of 10, his mother died. Afterwards, he was supported by his second brother He Zhufan and transferred from a private school to primary school. In 1910, 13-year-old He Zhuguo was taken to Guangzhou by his second brother He Zhufan, who was an official in Guangdong, and was admitted to Guangdong Suihuan School. He Zhufan ordered He Zhuguo to apply for the third phase of the Huangpu Army Primary School. After graduation, He Zhuguo entered the sixth phase of Baoding Military Academy in 1916.In April 1917, he was sent to Japan to study in the 12th Cavalry Division of the Imperial Japanese Army Academy. After graduating from the country in the autumn of 1919, he served as the tactical instructor and squad leader of the cavalry section of the Baoding Military Academy.

=== Service with the Beiyang Government ===
In July 1922, He Zhuguo arrived in Northeast China to join Zhang Zuolin, the Feng Department, and served as military instructor and director of the cavalry section of the Northeast Army Jiangwutang. In 1923, he was promoted to captain of the third team of the Lieutenant Colonel. Since then, he participated in the Fengtian Army and won the trust of Zhang Xueliang. In the spring of 1924, with Feng Yuxiang as the witness, He Zhuguo married Jia Chengjing, the niece of Jia Deyao, the former principal of Baoding Military Academy.

In September 1924, the Second Zhili-Fengtian War broke out. Zhang Zuolin organized Fengtian Army into 6 troops. Zhang Xueliang and Guo Songling served as the third and deputy commanders of the 3rd Army, respectively. The 3rd and 1st Army established a joint headquarters to take charge of the front line of Shanhaiguan and Jiumenkou. He Zhuguo served as Chief of Staff of the Combat Section of the Coalition Command. After the victory of Fengtian Army in the Second Zhili-Fengtian War, Fengtian Army established the Jinyu Garrison Command, with Zhang Xueliang as the commander-in-chief, Guo Songling as the deputy commander-in-chief, and He Zhuguo as the commander-in-chief of the colonel. After Fengtian Clique won the Second Zhili-Fengtian War, Zhang Zuolin led the Xuanfu Army south to expand territory.

In the spring of 1925, with the consent of Zhang Zuolin and Zhang Xueliang, He Zhuguo planned to study in the Japanese Army University. Before his departure, he went to Beijing to visit Jiang Dengxuan and Han Linchun, the commander and deputy commander of the Xuanfu Army. Jiang Dengxuan and Han Linchun convinced He Zhuguo to abandon plans to study in Japan, and appointed him the Xuanfu Army combat section chief of staff. The Xuanfu Army advanced all the way to Bengbu, Anhui, But within half a year, the communication lines were intercepted by Sun Chuanfang and Chen Tiaoyuan, and Feng Jun was forced to withdraw to the northeast. In November 1925, Guo Songling, deputy commander of the Fengyu Jinyu Garrison Command, rebelled against Fengtian. Zhang Xueliang negotiated with Guo Songling but failed to reach an agreement, but was ready to fight against Guo Songling's deputy. At that time, the cavalry of Heilongjiang came to the front to reinforce, and Zhang Xueliang ordered He Zhuguo to serve as a cavalry commander. During the pacification of Guo Songling, He Zhuguo served with distinction. He was awarded the gold medal of bravery and appointed head of the 45th regiment.

In the spring of 1926, Zhang Zuolin, Wu Peifu, and Yan Xishan besieged the Feng Yuxiang Guominjun. He Zhuguo led the 45th Regiment to defeat the army of Tang Zhidao in Luanhe and attacked Rehe. In November 1926, the Northern Expeditionary Army defeated Sun Chuanfang's main force. In order to contend with the Northern Expeditionary Army, the warlords in the north supported Zhang Zuolin as the commander-in-chief of the National Pacification Army. In 1927, He Zhuguo entered Henan with Zhang Xueliang's regiment to fight against the Wu Peifu's former deputy commander, Jin Yun'e. He Zhuguo conquered Zhongmu, Zhengzhou, Kaifeng, Luoyang and other places successively, and then acted as the commander of the 45th Brigade. In April of the same year, he was promoted to the commander of the 37th Brigade Major General and Kaifeng Police. In May of the same year, he led the Ministry to participate in the battle of Linying in southern Henan. In June of the same year, the 37th Brigade renamed the Provisional 23rd Division. In October of the same year, He Zhuguo led his ministry to fight against Yan Xishan and conquered Dingzhou. In April 1928, He Zhuguo battled with Feng Yuxiang in Zhangde to defeat Han Lingshan, and He Zhuguo was promoted to lieutenant general. In 1928, Zhang Zuolin died in the Huanggutun Incident. Zhang Xueliang succeeded the Northeast Security Commander and reorganized Fengjun. He Zhuguo served as the lieutenant general of the 3rd Brigade of the Northeast Army Infantry, stationed in Rehe Lingyuan. In December 1928, Northeast China changed its flag.

=== Service with the Nationalist Government ===
In the autumn of 1929, Zhang Xueliang sent He Zhuguo and others to visit Qiucao with the Nanjing National Government delegation. He Zhuguo was also instructed to test the attitude of the Japanese government towards Northeast China. In Japan, when He Zhuguo held talks with the Japanese Chief of Staff, the Secretary of the Army, and officials of the Ministry of Foreign Affairs, the Japanese side made a territorial claim to Northeast China, demands He Zhuguo rejected on the spot.

In April 1930, the Central Plains War broke out. Zhang Xueliang called for peace, and sent the Northeast Army to Shanhaiguan for armed mediation. He Zhuguo led the Northeast Army 9th Brigade to Shanhaiguan to carefully observe war developments.

After the September 18th Incident in 1931, Zhang Xueliang, who presided over the Beiping Branch of the National Government Military Commission, again ordered He Zhuguo to station in Shanhaiguan.

At the end of November 1932, Masjiro Ochiai asked He Zhuguo to create an independent buffer zone in Luandong and Rehe, promising to supply all governmental and military expenses. He Zhuguo has never given an affirmative answer.

On December 8, 1932, the Kwantung Army stationed in Jinzhou bombarded Yuguan (i.e. Shanhaiguan) with armored vehicles. When He Zhuguo came forward to negotiate, Japan asked He Zhuguo to admit that the bombardment was a misunderstanding, asked He Zhuguo to stop anti-Japanese actions, and again proposed the creation of a buffer zone. Otherwise, Japan will send troops to occupy Shanhaiguan, and even Beiping and Tianjin. Zhang Xueliang immediately dispatched troops to reinforce He Zhuguo.

On New Year's Day in 1933, the Japanese Kwantung Army advanced to Yuguan, and opened fire on the Chinese defenders, and Shi Shi'an, the 626 regiment of He Zhuguo, returned fire. From the morning of January 2, 1933, to the afternoon of January 3, the 626 regiment stubbornly resisted the Japanese army. He Zhuguo personally led the defensive battle. Due to the heavy casualties, He Zhuoguo was forced to retreat.

After the retreat from Shanhaiguan He Zhuguo was ordered to defend Beiping and Tianjin. The Japanese turned to Rehe. Because of the weak resistance of Chinese defenders such as Zhang Zuoxiang, Wan Fulin, and Tang Yulin, the Japanese army occupied Rehe. Zhang Xueliang was forced by Chiang Kai-shek to resign as the Northeastern Army commander, but not before reorganizing the Northeast Army. He Zhuguo was reorganized into the 57th Army, governing the Army 109 Division, 115 Division, 120 Division, Cavalry 3rd Division, Artillery 15th Regiment, etc.

In January 1934, Zhang Xueliang was recalled by Chiang Kai-shek and served as deputy commander-in-chief of the Yu-E-Wan anti-communist encirclement campaign. He Zhuguo's 57th Army was transferred to Xiaogan, Songbu, Huang'an, Macheng, and West Anhui in eastern Hubei, and surrounded the 25th Army at Dabie Mountain in Xuhai. Due to the unsuccessful operation, He Zhuguo turned to defense. In July of the same year, He Zhuguo was instructed to leave the army and study in the Lushan Officer Training Corps.

In January 1935, Chiang Kai-shek changed the headquarters of the bandits from Henan, Hubei and Anhui to Wuchang, the chairman of the military committee of the National Government, and Zhang Xueliang served as the director of the camp. Chiang Kai-shek was preparing to transfer the Northeast Army to Guizhou, but He Zhuguo suggested that Zhang Xueliang transfer the Northeast Army west of Luoyang to stabilize the military and prepare for the recovery of the Northeast. He Zhuguo's proposal was adopted by Zhang Xueliang, who agreed with Chiang Kai-shek. Soon, Zhang Xueliang formed the cavalry corps with the seven cavalry divisions of the Northeast Army and the central cavalry dispatched by Chiang Kai-shek, and appointed He Zhuguo as commander.

=== Xi'an Incident ===
In the summer of 1935, the Long March of the Central Red Army was about to enter Shaanxi. The National Government established the Northwest Bandit Headquarters in Xi'an, with Zhang Xueliang as deputy commander-in-chief. Zhang Xueliang transferred the Northeast Army to Shaanxi to block the Red Army, and He Zhuguo's cavalry army was also transferred to Shaanxi. Since then, the Northeast Army has suffered heavy losses in many engagements with the Red Army. Zhang Xueliang changed from actively suppressing the CCP to passively dealing with it. In January 1936, the Central Committee of the Chinese Communist Party issued the "Red Army's Letter to All Officers of the Northeast Army for the Willingness to Join the Anti-Japanese Army with the Northeast Army." In August 1936, when the Red Army was passing the He Zhuoguo cavalry defense zone, Peng Dehuai wrote to He Zhuguo, hoping that He Zhuguo would cooperate with the Red Army's actions. After negotiating with Zhu Rui, director of the Political Department of the First Red Army, He Zhuguo took the initiative to make way for the Red Army and enable the three main forces of the Chinese Workers, Peasants and the Red Army to join the division.

Before and after the Xi'an Incident in December 1936, He Zhuguo followed Zhang Xueliang closely and supported the Chinese Communist Party's idea of a peaceful settlement of the Xi'an Incident. After Zhang Xueliang sent Chiang Kai-shek to Nanjing and was detained, in January 1937, a senior general of the Northeast Army produced a main and a faction and a main battle group on how to rescue Zhang Xueliang. He Zhuguo and Wang Yizhe were the representatives of the Harmony School. The Harmony School believed that the Xi'an problem should be solved first and then Zhang Xueliang was rescued. On February 2, the young main officer of the Northeastern Army killed Wang Yizhe, and He Zhuguo fled into Yanghucheng Mansion because of news. Since then, in order to stabilize the Northeast Army, He Zhuguo met with CCP leader Zhou Enlai and others many times, and soon stabilized the Northeast Army. Soon, He Zhuguo went to Nanjing on behalf of the Northeast Army, and went to Xikou to meet with Zhang Xueliang to agree on the reorganization of the Northeast Army. Chiang Kai-shek then appointed He Zhuguo as the deputy director of Xi'an Xingying, and then appointed him as deputy director of the Yu Ansu Soviet Military Reorganization Committee to reorganize the Northeast Army who had just entered the Henan Anhui Soviet. After the reorganization was completed, He Zhuguo served as the commander of the 2nd Army of the Central Cavalry and remained in the northwest.

== Second Sino-Japanese War ==
On July 7, 1937, the Lugou Bridge incident broke out. At that time, He Zhuguo, who was stationed in Xianyang, was instructed to go to the northern plains of Jinbei to stand by and was included in the second theater sequence. In August 1937, in order to defend Taiyuan, He Zhuguo led a cavalry army to cross the Yellow River from Fengling, and participated in the military meeting of the second theater when passing through Taiyuan. On September 14, He Zhuguo was instructed to go north from the original Pingbei, stop the Japanese Sakai Mechanical Corps detachment from Datong to the south, and destroy the Pingsui Railway, and cooperate with the Helong Division of the 120th Division of the Eighth Route Army. On September 17, He Zhuguo battled with the Japanese army in Jingping Town. The Japanese army suffered five to six hundred casualties. He Zhuguo suffered heavy losses. Soon after, the main force of the Japanese army went south through Shuoxian County, and the Ministry of He Zhu moved to the west of Jingping for rest. In the battle of Xinkou, He Zhuguo led the 120th Division of the Eighth Route Army with the 2nd Army and Helong to fight guerrilla warfare in northern Shanxi, attacking the rear of the Japanese army and destroying the traffic line. After the Japanese army captured Taiyuan, He Zhuguo's cavalry army was ordered to attack Japanese Shuo County, Jingping, Pinglu, Daiyue, Yingxian and other strongholds for several months and destroy the bridge. At the end of February 1938, the Japanese attacked the Ministry of He Zhu and were counterattacked by the Ministry of He Zhu to restore the original base. In 1938, after the publication of Mao Zedong's "On Protracted Warfare", He Long sent 100 volumes to He Zhuguo, and He Zhuguo convened a corps of cadres and above to study. In January 1939, He Zhu was transferred to Shenmu, Shaanxi for rest. During the period of Shenmu, He Zhuguo did good things for the people. He Zhuguo founded Shenmu Middle School to help farmers build "Yunhuiqu". In the winter of 1938, the Japanese army attacked Ikzhao League from Chahar, and the National Government decided to relocate the Mausoleum of Genghis Khan. In May 1939, He Zhuoguo, an envoy of the spirit guard, sent two cavalry regiments to defend. In July of the same year, the tomb of Genghis Khan moved to the Taibai Palace in Xinglong Mountain, Gansu.

During his stay in northern Shaanxi, He Zhuguo went to Yan'an three times to solve military problems and was welcomed by Mao Zedong. Among them, in the autumn of 1939, He Zhuguo led his department to relocate to southern Henan, passing Yan'an. The military circles of Yan'an held a welcome party for him. Mao Zedong gave a welcome speech in person. At the end of 1939, He Zhuguo led 2 cavalry troops to defend Henan. Soon, the New Fourth Army Peng Xuefeng guerrilla detachment entered Boxian, Huaiyang, and defended with He Zhu ’s Ministry. In 1940, Zhang Yunyi, chief of staff of the New Fourth Army, commanded the troops of the New Fourth Army north of the Yangtze River. Zhang Yunyi and He Zhuguo sent liaison personnel to each other's forces to discuss the battle together. Tan Youlin, deputy brigade commander of the New Fourth Army, etc., went to Yan'an to attend the 7th National Congress of the Chinese Communist Party. He Zhuguo's headquarters issued a special pass to them. In 1940, the Japanese army transferred troops from North China to attack Fuyang. In cooperation with the New Fourth Army, He Zhuguo held Fuyang.

After the incident in southern Anhui in 1941, He Zhuguo still reached an agreement with the Peng Xuefeng Department of the New Fourth Army: if the two sides were forced to play against each other, they would follow the approach of the Red Army and the Northeast Army before the Xi'an Incident. There are a large number of puppet troops in Shangqiu, Henan and Bo County in the north of Anhui, around the defense zone of Hezhu State Department. He Zhuguo was instructed to counter the puppet army and included a large number of local guerrillas.

In January 1941, with the cooperation of a large number of armored vehicles, the Japanese army stationed in Shangqiu set off for Guide and went to the front of the boundary to sweep the Huangfan area. He Zhu was blocked by the Ministry of State.

In July 1941, the 2nd Army was ordered to expand into the 15th Army, governing the 2nd Army and the 92nd Army of Li Xianzhou. He Zhuguo was appointed Commander-in-Chief of the 15th Army. In the same year, Tang Enbo's 31st Army was transferred to Henan, Tang Enbo served as the deputy commander of the first theater, and the commander-in-chief of the four provinces of Jiangsu, Shandong, Henan and Anhui, and He Zhuguo served as the deputy commander of the four provinces of Sulu, Henan and Anhui. In fact, Tang Enbei was ordered by Chiang Kai-shek to monitor the Chinese Communist Party and the New Fourth Army. Because He Zhuguo had cooperated with the 120th Division of the Eighth Route Army in northern Shanxi and had frequent contacts with Yan'an, Tang Enbo was wary of He Zhu's state. The Kuomintang spy organization in Henan with Tang Bolai secretly investigated and monitored He Zhuguo, listing He Zhuguo's accusations of "accommodating the Communist Party", "communicating the enemy", and "smuggling", but it was lost because of no evidence.

In April 1944, Tang Enbo was transferred to Guizhou after the defeat of the Central Plains against Japan. He Zhuguo was co-edited with Guangxi's Li Pinxian, and changed the original theater to the tenth war zone. Li Pinxian served as commander-in-chief and He Zhuguo served as deputy commander-in-chief. The Tenth War Zone administers the 15th Army and the 19th Army, defending Eastern Henan. In July 1945, under the order of Chiang Kai-shek, He Zhuguo held direct negotiations with Lieutenant General Imai Takeo, the general commander of the Japanese Commander-in-Chief of the Japanese Dispatch Army. He Zhuguo proposed that "Japan wants peace with China and must regard world peace as an indispensable important matter "," Japan must withdraw its troops from Manchuria and overseas after the war "and other four opinions. The negotiations ended without result, and Zhuzhu Guo reported the negotiations to the Chongqing National Government.

== Chinese Civil War ==
After Japan surrendered in 1945, He Zhuguo was still the deputy commander-in-chief of the 10th theater and commander-in-chief of the 15th Army. The commander ordered He Zhuguo to head to Xuzhou, and Jiang Jieshi ordered He Zhuguo to go to Chongqing for a meeting. After arriving in Chongqing, Chiang Kai-shek talked with He Zhuguo several times, preparing to send He Zhuguo to take over the Northeast. But He Zhuoguo asked to resign from the military and turn to govern the Yellow River. Chiang Kai-shek persuaded him: "First solve the Northeast military problem, it will take about two years, then go to govern the Yellow River!" He Zhuguo accepted the appointment as deputy director and chief of staff of the Northeast camp and commander-in-chief of the Northeast Route Guard. In October 1945, He Zhuguo won the Medal of Honor. During the Chinese Anti-Japanese War, he worked closely with the Eighth Route Army and the New Fourth Army under the leadership of He Long and Peng Xuefeng in the northwestern Shanxi, Shaanxi-Ganning, Eastern Henan, and Northern Anhui. He visited Yan'an twice and was warmly welcomed by leaders such as Mao Zedong, Zhou Enlai and Zhu De. After the victory of China's Anti-Japanese War, he served as chief of staff of the Northeast Xingyuan, but failed to take office because of sudden blindness in both eyes.

After taking over, He Zhuoguo was invited to attend a banquet held by Xiong Shihui. His eyes were unwell the next day, and his eyes were blind on the third day. He was ineffective in Chongqing. In the spring of 1946, approved by Chiang Kai-shek, He Zhuguo went to the United States for treatment. The consultation of an American ophthalmologist determined that the food was poisoned, which damaged the optic nerve and could no longer be treated.

In the spring of 1947, He Zhuguo returned home with his wife and children and settled in Hangzhou. In May 1949, the Chinese People's Liberation Army occupied Hangzhou. He Zhuguo sent a congratulatory message to Mao Zedong on the same day. Mao Zedong replied that He Zhuguo reassure him in Hangzhou. The People's Government of Zhejiang Province immediately sent a condolences. He refused to go to Taiwan.

== People's Republic of China ==
After the founding of the People's Republic of China, He Zhuguo opened a sugar factory in Hangzhou in response to the people's government's call to develop production, but he was in debt one year later. After asking the Premier Zhou Enlai for help, Zhou Enlai helped He Zhuguo to end his debt and introduced him to the Soviet Red Cross Hospital for eye treatment. In 1954, the United Front Work Department of the CCP Central Committee invited He Zhuguo to serve as a member of the National Committee of the Chinese People's Political Consultative Conference. On December 12, 1956, Beijing held a commemorative meeting for the 20th anniversary of the Xi’an Incident. He Zhuguo attended the invitation of Zhou Enlai. After the meeting, He Zhuguo was received by Mao Zedong. Standing members of the Fifth and Sixth CPPCC National Committees, members of the Central Committee of the Revolutionary Committee of the Kuomintang, and standing committee members.

In the anti-rightist movement in 1957, He Zhuguo was labeled as a "rightist" because he proposed two opinions to the Chinese Communist Party. The two opinions were that the election should be conducted in a differential manner, and the other was that farmers did not have enough food.

After the end of the Cultural Revolution, in the spring of 1978, the Zhejiang Provincial Party Committee of the CCP why Zhuguo screened the vindication, and He Zhuguo returned to serve as a member of the CPPCC National Committee. In 1979, He Zhuguo was added as a member of the Standing Committee of the Fifth National Committee of the Chinese People's Political Consultative Conference, and served as the central member and member of the Standing Committee of the Revolutionary Committee of the Kuomintang. He moved to Beijing from Hangzhou.

On September 3, 1985, He Zhuguo died of a heart attack in Beijing at the age of 88. On September 15, the CPPCC National Committee held a farewell ceremony for Comrade He Zhuguo's body in Beijing.
