= Han Linchun =

Chinese general (1885–1930)

- 韓麟春
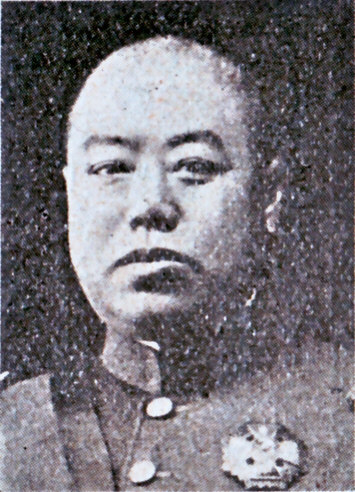

Personal details
- Born: 1885 Liaoyang, Fengtian, Qing Empire
- Died: January 18, 1930 (aged 44–45) (Note: Wu & Su (2000), p. 266, says he was born in 1885. "Northeast People's Chronicles", page 272, claims that he was born in 1888. Xu (2007), p. 2664 says he was born in 1888. The 1931 edition of "Northeast Yearbook" and Xu (2007), p.2664, places his death date on January 18, 1930. Other dates reported include December 29, 1929 and March 2, 1930. See Wu & Su (2000), p. 272 for the above-mentioned years of death. The Asahi Shimbun in Osaka, Japan stated that he died on December 25, 1927.) Shenyang, Fengtian

Military service
- Allegiance: Qing Dynasty; Beiyang Government; Fengtian Clique
- Years of service: 1907-1930
- Rank: General
- Wars: Second Zhili-Fengtian War; Anti-Fengtian War; Northern Expedition

Han Linchun (Chinese: 韓麟春; pinyin: Hán Línchūn; Wade–Giles: Han Lin-ch'un; 1885–January 18, 1930), courtesy name Zi Fangchen, was a Chinese general during the Warlord Era affiliated with the Fengtian Clique. As Superintendent of the Mukden Arsenal, he played an important role in modernizing the Fengtian Army after its defeat in the First Zhili-Fengtian War.

== Early life ==
Han Linchun was born into a rich peasant family living in Liaoyang, a city in southeastern Manchuria. Han did well in school, and left in 1904 to study military science in Japan, where he entered the artillery department of the Imperial Japanese Army Academy. He graduated in 1907. After returning to China, he successively served as a member of the Ordinance Department of the Army Department, the Director of the Ordinance Department, and the Dean of the Army Lecture Hall.

After the founding of the Republic of China, Han served in various positions in the Ministry of the Army. In June 1916, he was promoted to be a military advisor. In 1919, he visited Europe as a military attaché. In December 1921, Liang Shiyi's cabinet was established, and Han was appointed as deputy chief of the army. After the First Zhili Fengtian War, on May 2, 1922, he was dismissed.

== Rebuilding the Fengtian Army ==
After his defeat in the First Zhili-Fengtian War, Zhang Zuolin was anxious to rebuild the Fengtian Army on a much stronger basis. On the recommendation of his Chief of Staff Yang Yuting, Zhang appointed Han to be Superintendent of the Mukden Arsenal. With his formal military training, Han was considered part of the "new" men Zhang recruited to rebuild his army. The other faction in Zhang's command were the officers who had been with him since his time as a Qing army officer or even from when he was a bandit, the so-called "old" men. Han recruited technicians from Japan, Germany and other countries, purchased equipment, and developed weapon manufacturing under strict management. As a result, the Mukden Arsenal became the highest-capacity armaments factory in China, and by 1928 had an output rivaling that of the rest of China combined. In 1924 Han himself helped develop the Mukden Arsenal Mauser which became the standard rifle of the Fengtian Clique. For this innovation he was awarded numerous medals. After the establishment of the Army Reorganization Office of the Three Eastern Provinces, Han and Jiang Dengxuan were made its deputy commanders under Sun Liechen. Because the latter was occupied as Governor of Jilin, Jiang and Han ran the day-to-day affairs of the office. Together they were responsible for much of the expansion and modernization of the Fengtian Army in the lead-up to the Second Zhili-Fengtian War.

== Second Zhili-Fengtian War ==
In September 1924, the Second Zhili-Fengtian War broke out. Han Linchun became deputy commander of the 1st Army under Jiang Dengxuan. Han personally led a dare-to-die corps of 3,000 men against a strongly fortified position held by Cao Ying, ripping off his shirt and fighting bare-chested. His men took heavy casualties but were ultimately successful, turning the flank of the Zhili defensive lines and helping win control of Shanhai Pass. Later in the campaign, Han attempted to remove an artillery officer serving under Guo Songling, infuriating the latter commander and almost causing him to abandon the battle. However, Zhang Zuolin's son Zhang Xueliang managed to resolve the issue and Fengtian would go on to win the war.

In November 1925, Guo Songling rebelled against Zhang Zuolin. Jiang Dengxuan, who attempted to dissuade Guo, was arrested and executed. Han temporarily resigned due to illness at this time, thus escaping the catastrophe. After Guo Songling's mutiny was suppressed, Han was appointed as the commander of the 4th Front Army that Jiang had led, and formed a joint command with Zhang Xueliang and his 3rd Front Army.

== Anti-Fengtian War ==
In January 1926, Zhang Zuolin's erstwhile ally Feng Yuxiang and his Guominjun declared war on the Fengtian Clique. The Guominjun was encircled and suppressed by Fengtian and its Zhili allies. Zhang Xueliang and Han Linchun fought fiercely against the Guominjun at the South Gate of Changping in Beijing. Under Han's command, they defeated the Guominjun in August. During the battle, Fengtian commander Wu Junsheng's army pillaged some of the surrounding area, so Han and Zhang removed Wu and the other officers involved.

On December 1, 1926, Zhang Zuolin became the commander-in-chief of the administration he had installed to lead the Beiyang Government, and Han was promoted to General of the Army. In 1927, Han and Zhang Xueliang were tasked with fighting off the Kuomintang's Northern Expedition. Due to the opposing views on strategy, the relationship between the two gradually deteriorated. In June of the same year, Han was appointed as the commander of the 4th Army. In August, Han Linchun began secret negotiations with He Chengjun (a former classmate from the Japanese Imperial Army Academy) sent by the KMT. The negotiations eventually led to Fengtian's surrender and retreat back into Manchuria.

== Death ==
On January 18, 1930, Han Linchun died of illness in Shenyang at the age of 46.

== Bibliography ==
- McCormack, Gavin (1977). Chang Tso-lin in Northeastern China, 1911-1928: China, Japan, and the Manchurian Idea. Stanford, California: Stanford University Press. ISBN 0-8047-0945-9.
- Waldron, Arthur (1995). From War to Nationalism: China's Turning Point, 1924-1925. New York: Cambridge University Press. ISBN 0521472385.
- Chi, Hsi-Cheng (1976). Warlord Politics in China: 1916-1928. Stanford, California: Stanford University Press.
- Wu, Yuwen; Su, Yan (2000). Biographies of the Republic of China, Volume 10 (in Chinese). Beijing: Zhonghua Book Company. ISBN 7-101-02114-X.
- Xu, Youchun, ed. (2007). The Great Dictionary of the Republic of China (in Chinese) (Enlarged ed.). Shijiazhuang: Hebei People's Publishing House. ISBN 978-7-202-03014-1.
