= Wan Fulin =

Republic of China general and politician (1880–1951)

Wan Fulin 萬福麟
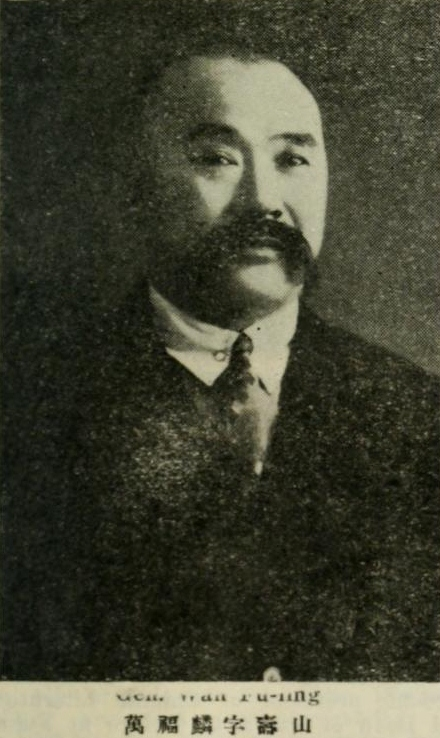

Governor of Liaoning
- In office 3 May 1940 – 4 September 1945
- Preceded by: Tang Juwu
- Succeeded by: Xu Zhen

Governor of Heilongjiang
- In office 9 February 1929 – 17 November 1931
- Preceded by: Chang Yinhuai
- Succeeded by: Ma Zhanshan

Personal details
- Born: 20 November 1880 Nong'an County, Jilin, Qing China
- Died: 15 July 1951 (aged 70) Taichung County, Taiwan
- Awards: Order of Wen-Hu

Military service
- Allegiance: Republic of China
- Years of service: 1927–1945
- Rank: General

Wan Fulin (traditional Chinese: 萬福麟; simplified Chinese: 万福麟; 20 November 1880 – 15 July 1951) was a general and politician of the Republic of China. He was a member of the Fengtian clique and the military governor of Heilongjiang before joining the Nationalist government.

== Career ==
Wan was born in Jilin in 1880. He enlisted in the army in his early years, joining the Fengtian clique after the establishment of the Republic of China. He served as a commander in various units of the Fengtian Army. He became governor of Heilongjiang in 1928 after governor Wu Junsheng was assassinated along with Fengtian clique leader Zhang Zuolin in the Huanggutun incident. On 29 December 1928, Zhang Zuolin's successor and son Zhang Xueliang along with Wan and Zhang Zuoxiang, acting against Japanese interests and demands in Manchuria declared in a public wire that the four provinces of Fengtian (Liaoning), Jilin, Heilongjiang and Rehe would accept the rule of the National Government based in Nanjing. From 1929 until 1931, he was chairman of the Heilongjiang provincial government.

During the Mukden Incident he was in Beiping, cut off from Heilongjiang by the Japanese invasion of Liaoning and Jilin provinces. Zhang Xueliang promoted Ma Zhanshan Governor of Heilongjiang in his place. After the Northeastern Army retreated from the Japanese-occupied Northeast he commanded its 32nd Corps, including the 139th Division at Lengkou Pass during the Defense of the Great Wall in 1933. Afterwards, he commanded the 53rd Corps, retained in Northern China while most of the Northeastern Army was sent to Northwestern China to fight the Chinese Communists.

After the Marco Polo Bridge Incident he sent a brigade to reinforce 29th Corps during the Battle of Beiping-Tianjin. His 53rd Corps also fought in the Beiping–Hankou Railway Operation and the Tianjin–Pukou Railway Operation. He commanded the 26th Army in the Battle of Wuhan. During the war, he was chairman of the Liaoning provincial government in exile. From 1942 to 1945, he was a member of the National Military Council. After the end of the war with Japan he served in various anti-Communist positions in North China. He left for Taiwan in 1949 and died in Taichung in 1951.

== Sources ==
- Hsu Long-hsuen and Chang Ming-kai, History of The Sino-Japanese War (1937–1945) 2nd Ed., 1971. Translated by Wen Ha-hsiung, Chung Wu Publishing; 33, 140th Lane, Tung-hwa Street, Taipei, Taiwan Republic of China.
- The Generals of WWII: Generals of China; Wan Fulin
