= Yang Yuting (warlord) =

Chinese warlord

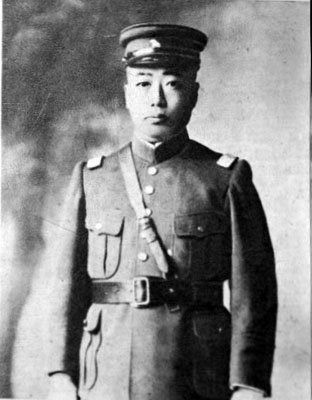
- Yang Yuting in 1924
- Born: 1886; Faku County, Liaoning, Qing dynasty
- Died: January 10, 1929 (aged 42–43); Shenyang, Republic of China
- Education: Imperial Japanese Army Academy
- Occupations: General, Warlord, Governor of Jiangsu

Yang Yuting (simplified Chinese: 杨宇霆; traditional Chinese: 楊宇霆; pinyin: Yáng Yǔtíng; Wade–Giles: Yang Yü-t'ing; 1886 – 10 January 1929) was a Chinese general in the Fengtian Army and Military Governor (warlord) of Jiangsu during the early period of the Republic of China (Beiyang government) from August to November 1925. He was executed by Zhang Xueliang during a political power struggle.

== Biography ==
A native of Shenyang, Yang was sent to Japan by the Qing government in 1904 to study at the Tokyo Shimbu Gakko, a military preparatory school. He continued his education at the Imperial Japanese Army Academy, specializing in artillery. He returned to China after the Xinhai Revolution of 1911 and served in various military posts in the Beiyang government, and was chief of staff to Zhang Zuolin, the founder of the Fengtian clique, during the First Zhili–Fengtian War of 1922 and the Second Zhili–Fengtian War of 1924. He was governor of Jiangsu Province from August–November 1925. During Guo Songling's uprising against Zhang Zuolin (Anti-Fengtian War), he was forced to retreat to Dalian and seek help from the Japanese Kwantung Army.

In 1928, after the assassination of Zhang Zuolin in the Huanggutun Incident, Yang came into increasing conflict with Zhang's son and heir, Zhang Xueliang. He was particularly opposed to the Northeast Flag Replacement, which united Manchuria with the Kuomintang government of the Republic of China.

On 10 January 1929, he was among a group of generals invited to Zhang's home, ostensibly for a game of mahjong. Zhang arrested the generals, held trials that night, and had them executed. This allowed Zhang to replace leaders from his father's administration with those whom Zhang deemed more loyal.

== Sources ==
- Rulers: Chinese Administrative divisions, Jiangsu
