= Northeastern Army =

20th-century Chinese army

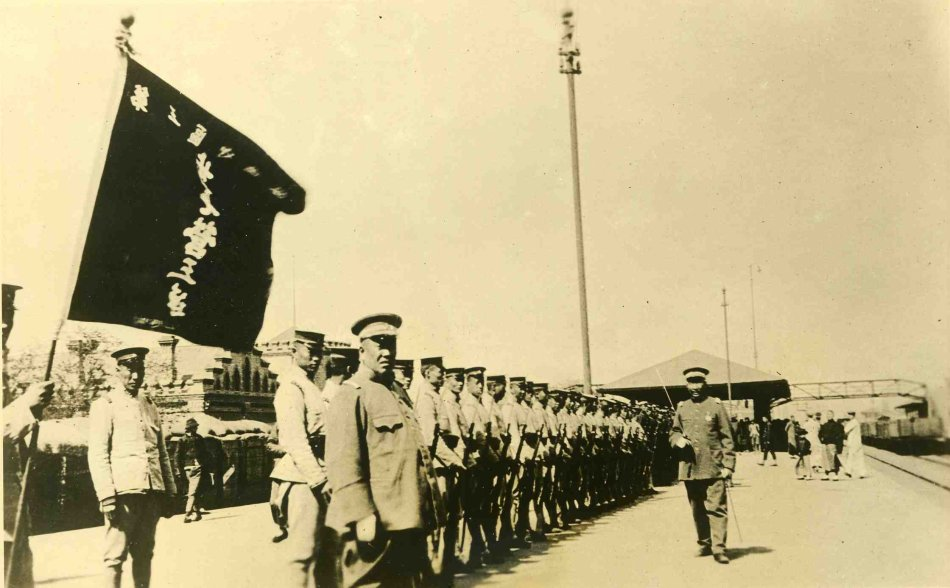
- A company of Northeastern Army soldiers
- Active: 1911–1937
- Allegiance: Fengtian Clique (1911–1928); National Pacification Army (1926–1928); Nationalist China (1928–1937)
- Size: 170,000–250,000 soldiers (1924); 4 gunboats and 7 support craft (1929); 40–100 planes (1924)
- Headquarters: Shenyang, Liaoning
- Foreign Suppliers: Japan; Germany; United Kingdom; France
- Major Engagements: First Zhili–Fengtian War; Second Zhili–Fengtian War; Anti-Fengtian War; Northern Expedition; Sino-Soviet conflict; Japanese invasion of Manchuria; Chinese Civil War

Commanders
- Commander-in-chief: Zhang Zuolin (first); Zhang Xueliang (last)
- Notable commanders: Zhang Zongchang; Guo Songling; Li Jinglin; ...full list

Northeastern Army
- Traditional Chinese: 東北軍
- Simplified Chinese: 东北军
- Literal meaning: "Northeast Army"
Transcriptions
Standard Mandarin
- Hanyu Pinyin: Dōngběi Jūn
- Wade–Giles: Tung^{1}-pei^{3} Chün^{1}

The Northeastern Army, also known as the Fengtian Army (see terminology), was a Chinese army that existed from 1911 to 1937. General Zhang Zuolin developed it as an independent fighting force during the Warlord Era. He used the army to control Northeastern China (Manchuria) and intervene in national politics. During the mid-1920s the Northeastern Army was the dominant military force in China, but in 1928 it was defeated by the Kuomintang's National Revolutionary Army (NRA) during the Northern Expedition. At the end of that campaign, Zhang Zuolin was assassinated and succeeded by his son Zhang Xueliang. When Xueliang subsequently pledged loyalty to the Kuomintang, the Northeastern Army became part of the NRA and was officially rechristened the "Northeastern Border Defense Force".

Despite being formally part of the NRA, the Northeastern Army remained de facto Zhang Xueliang's personal army. Zhang used the army to exercise considerable political influence during the tumultuous early years of the Nanjing Decade. The Japanese invaded Manchuria in 1931 and forced the Northeastern Army to retreat into northern China. After the army was unable to prevent further Japanese annexations of Chinese territory, Zhang was temporarily removed from command. In 1935, the army was reassigned to the Gansu-Ningxia border area in an attempt to encircle the Chinese Communist Party (CCP)'s base there. Both Zhang and his soldiers resented fighting fellow Chinese while Manchuria was under occupation. They negotiated a covert ceasefire with the CCP and hoped to convince Chiang Kai-shek to endorse a united front against Japan. After Chiang refused, the Northeastern Army kidnapped him and forced him to negotiate with the Communists. Although Chiang eventually agreed to end the civil war and work with the Communists against Japan, Zhang was placed under house arrest and the Northeastern Army was divided and reassigned to other commands.

== Terminology ==
Because of the semi-official nature (Note: For political reasons warlords rarely openly proclaimed independence from the national government, so the Northeastern Army nominally remained part of the national Beiyang Army until 1923, even when the two forces were actually at war with each other. During the late Warlord Era, Zhang Zuolin sometimes gave his army other official names, such as the "Peace Preservation Forces" or, with his allies, the "National Pacification Army". However, modern scholars do not generally use these short-lived names to refer to the Northeastern Army.) of armies during the Warlord Era, the Northeastern Army was known by a variety of names at different points its history. Zhang Zuolin's first significant military unit, the 27th Division, was based in Fengtian Province and therefore called the "Fengtian Army" (simplified Chinese: 奉系军; traditional Chinese: 奉系軍; pinyin: Fèng xì jūn). As he gained command of more divisions based in other Northeastern provinces, "Fengtian Army" continued to be used to refer just to those forces stationed in Fengtian, but also became a synecdoche for all of Zhang's troops. Even observers at the time noticed that this was imprecise:

As General He Zhuguo pointed out, the “Fengtian Army” (Fengjun) should be named the “Northeast Army” (dongbeijun) because it was centrally controlled by Zhang Zuolin and his staff; it was called the Fengtian Army only because the people were accustomed to call it the Fengtian Army.

Nonetheless, many modern scholars use "Fengtian Army" and "Northeast/Northeastern Army" interchangeably for the period before 1928. After 1928, the army was incorporated into the National Revolutionary Army and rechristened the "Northeastern Border Defense Force" (simplified Chinese: 东北边防军; traditional Chinese: 東北邊防軍; pinyin: Dōngběi bian fáng jūn; see Early Nanjing Decade). From that point on, English sources almost exclusively use some variant of "Northeastern Army".

== History ==
=== Background ===
The Northeastern Army had its roots in bandit forces organized by Zhang Zuolin in Manchuria around the turn of the twentieth century. At that time, the poverty of Manchuria encouraged many young men (known as Honghuzi or red-beards) to resort to banditry in order to feed themselves and their families. The declining Qing Dynasty lacked the resources to keep the peace and its sovereignty was challenged by Russian and Japanese imperialism. Qing soldiers had a reputation for petty tyranny and were often no more popular than bandits. Local authorities would even attempt to co-opt successful bandits: in 1903, Zhang and his few hundred followers were made the official garrison of Xinmin. Nonetheless, they remained more loyal to their commander than to the state, and when the Russo-Japanese War temporarily destroyed any semblance of local Qing authority, they fought as mercenaries for both sides.

=== Foundations of the Fengtian Army ===
The Fengtian Army used the symbols of the Beiyang Army during its early years, of which it was nominally a part.

In late October 1911, the Qing Dynasty brought Yuan Shikai out of retirement to command the New Army against the developing Xinhai Revolution. Yuan withdrew the New Army divisions from Manchuria, leaving Zhang Zuolin's border patrol battalion as one of the few military forces in the region. The reformist assembly was threatening to declare independence from the Qing, so Viceroy Zhao Erxun requested that Zhang march into Shenyang to help suppress the assembly. This Zhang did, and he then carried out a bloody purge of nationalists supportive of Sun Yat-sen's rival government in Guangdong. As thanks for his efforts, Yuan reorganized and expanded the border patrol battalions into the 27th division of the Beiyang Army, with Zhang as its commander. In June, Zhang was promoted to Lieutenant General. He was also named the Vice Minister of Military Affairs, but because his nominal superior had no local power base, Zhang was de facto head of all troops in Fengtian. Zhang supported Yuan against the failed Manchu Restoration, and as a reward was able to add the 28th and 29th divisions to his army. By this point, Zhang's small battalion had grown into a force of between 50,000 and 70,000 men. Local elites supportive of Zhang had gradually coalesced into what became known as the "Fengtian Clique". After Zhang became governor in 1915, the Fengtian Clique soon exerted control over the entirety of Manchuria.

=== Early Warlord Era ===
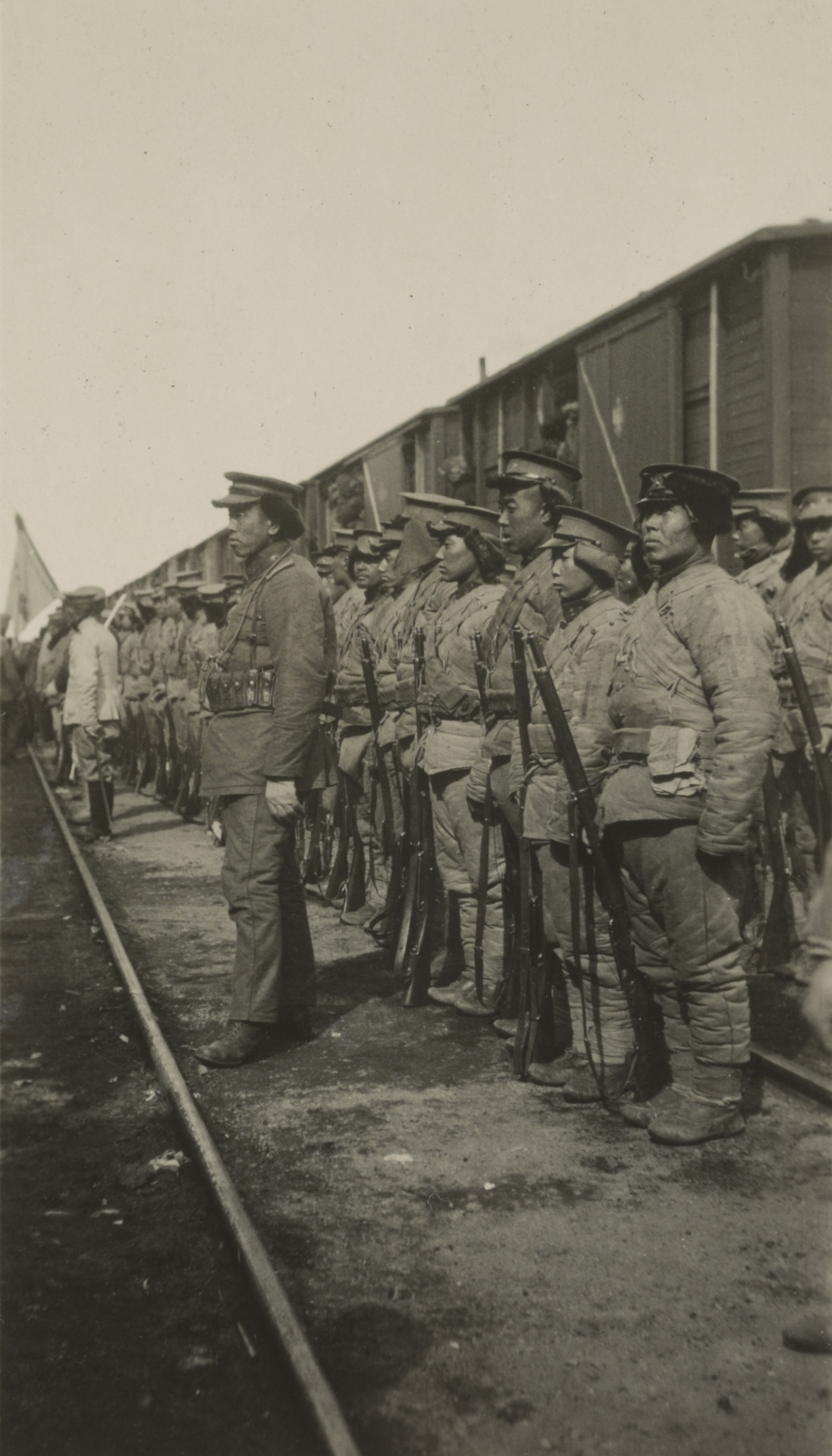
The Fengtian Army in 1917

Yuan Shikai's death left a power vacuum in Beijing. Zhang Zuolin and the Fengtian clique sided with Premier Duan Qirui in the first factional struggles for control of the Beiyang Government. (Note: The government of the Republic of China became known as the "Beiyang" Government because it was dominated by whichever clique of Beiyang Army generals controlled the capital at any given time.) As way of thanks, Duan let Zhang seize 17 million yen worth of Japanese military supplies intended for a different army. (Note: The supplies had been given to China by the Allies to supply a Chinese army for participation in World War I.) In 1918, Zhang sent a contingent of the Fengtian Army to help the Beiyang Government put down Sun Yat-sen's Constitutional Protection Movement in southern China. They saw some initial success in spring 1918, but by the summer fighting had reached a stalemate. The rest of the Fengtian Army was more successful: it secured control of the Manchurian railways for the Allies, which they needed to support their intervention in the Russian Civil War (China had joined World War I on the side of the Allies in 1917). For this, Zhang was promoted to full General in 1919.

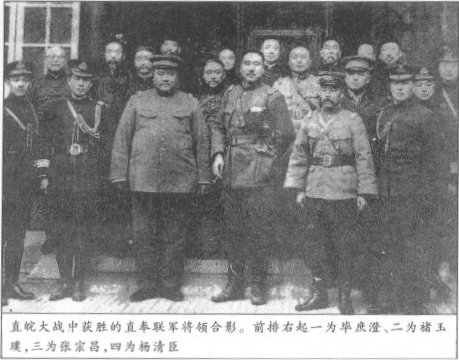
A group photo of Zhili and Fengtian commanders, victors of the Zhili–Anhui war.

By 1920, however, Zhang had grown wary of Duan Qirui's growing power. He therefore sided with Duan's rival Cao Kun in the Zhili-Anhui War of that year. Although the Fengtian Army did not engage in any fighting until after the outcome of the war was already clear, it emerged in a very strong postwar position. It captured high-quality equipment, added a new division (Note: the 16th division under Zhang Jinghui) and four new brigades, and left a 30,000-man garrison south of the Great Wall in a position where it could exert influence on the government in Beijing.

Nonetheless, by 1922 Zhang was once again afraid that the balance of power had begun to tip in the favor of Cao Kun's Zhili clique that now governed Beijing. He launched a war against his former ally to try and shore up his strategic position. In April, the Fengtian Army marched through the Shanhai Pass with the intention of occupying Hebei. Zhang Jinghui was in overall command with Zuo Fen in charge of the right flank. Sources disagree drastically on the army's size at this time—McCormack places it at 70–80,000, while Tong puts it as high as 120,000. The opposing force under General Wu Peifu was roughly equivalent in size or slightly smaller. Sources disagree about which force was better equipped. The armies clashed for control of Hebei's strategic railway lines. The Fengtian Army was defeated when its right flank was turned, either because of bad generalship or possibly because the Fengtian commanders had a secret deal with the Zhili Clique. The Fengtian Army had made heavy use of its artillery and some use of machine guns, but poor training and a lack of experience with modern weapons meant they had little practical effect. The routed army was forced to retreat back to Manchuria. The 1st and 16th divisions were nearly completely destroyed, only one brigade of the 28th survived the retreat. Several of the mixed brigades were scattered as well. Many of Zhang's officers who had been with him since his bandit days were discredited by the defeat.

=== Military reforms and the Second Zhili-Fengtian War ===
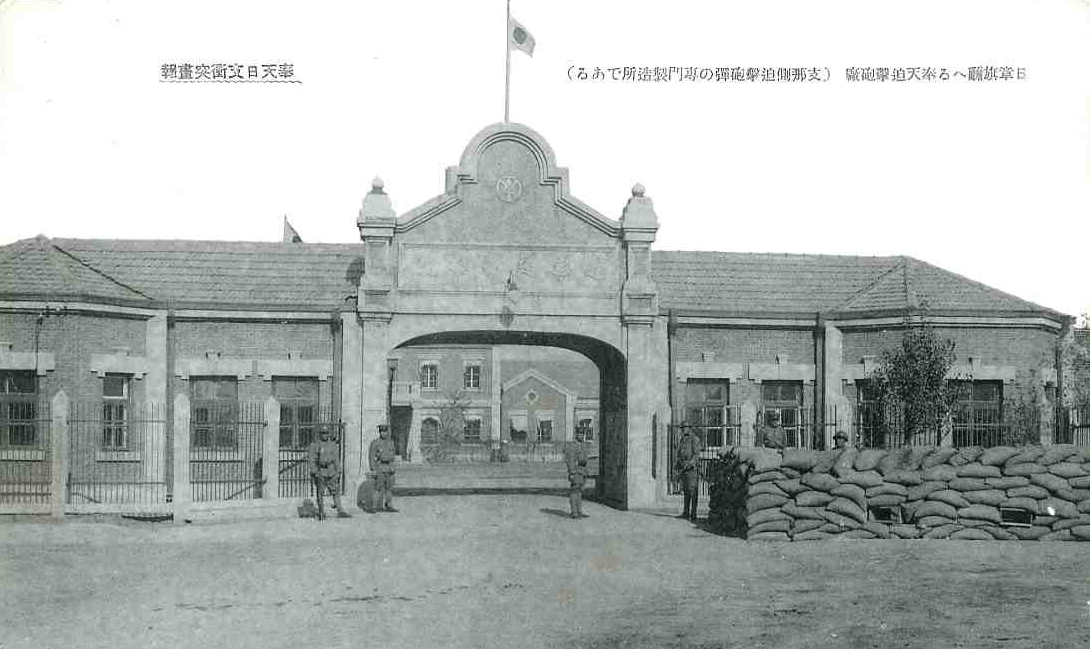
The trench mortar works at Shenyang (i.e., Mukden), near the main arsenal, was a state-of-the art facility for 1920s China. The facility produced an improved version of the Stokes mortar developed by Francis Sutton, a British Army veteran.

One of the most important periods in the history of the Fengtian Army was the two years between the First and Second Zhili-Fengtian Wars. Zhang Zuolin and his advisors came away from their defeat with the lesson that the army would need massive reorganization and re-equipment in order to fight the Zhili. Many of his old associates were purged from command for incompetence or suspected disloyalty. Zhang poured millions into purchasing foreign arms and developing domestic manufacture at the Mukden Arsenal (see Equipment). Funding also went towards a small navy and air force. The effectiveness of these reforms was mixed. Overall, the Fengtian Army was significantly better-equipped and led in 1924 than in 1922. However, corrupt and despotic officers such as Zhang Zongchang remained in high positions and tensions had been created between the new officers from staff colleges and the old officers from Zhang Zuolin's bandit days.

The decisive confrontation with Wu Peifu came in late 1924. Zhang had managed to secure a triangular alliance with the Anhui Clique based in Zhejiang and the Kuomintang based in Guangdong. The Fengtian Army was organized into six route armies totaling 170,000 to 250,000 men, under Zhang's overall command. The Second Army (under Li Jinglin) and the Sixth Army (Xu Langzhou) went north to Chaoyang to head off any potential flanking maneuvers, and they were able to surprise the unprepared Zhili garrison. Their superior rifles and grenades helped them secure control of the strategically important passes in Rehe by the time Feng Yuxiang's Third Zhili Army arrived. Further south the Fengtian Army had less luck at first. The First Army (Jiang Dengxuan) and the Third Army (Zhang Xueliang) failed to take Shanhai Pass before it was occupied by the enemy (they were later joined by the Fourth and Fifth). Direct assaults on the gate led by Guo Songling failed. However, Fengtian forces freed up by the victory at Chaoyang came south and flanked the Zhili position. Further breakthroughs at Jiumenkou led by Jiang Dengxuan and his deputy commander Han Linchun (once again assisted by superior weaponry) forced Zhili to retreat from Shanhai Pass and only Wu Peifu's personal presence finally stabilized the battle lines. Feng Yuxiang marched his forces back to Beijing and on 20 October seized control of the capital with the Beijing Coup. Although not necessarily fatal on its own, it became so after Yan Xishan stopped Zhili reinforcements from taking the railroad lines north through his territory. The Japanese intervened to stop Wu from embarking the reinforcements around the severed line and the Marshal's position quickly collapsed.

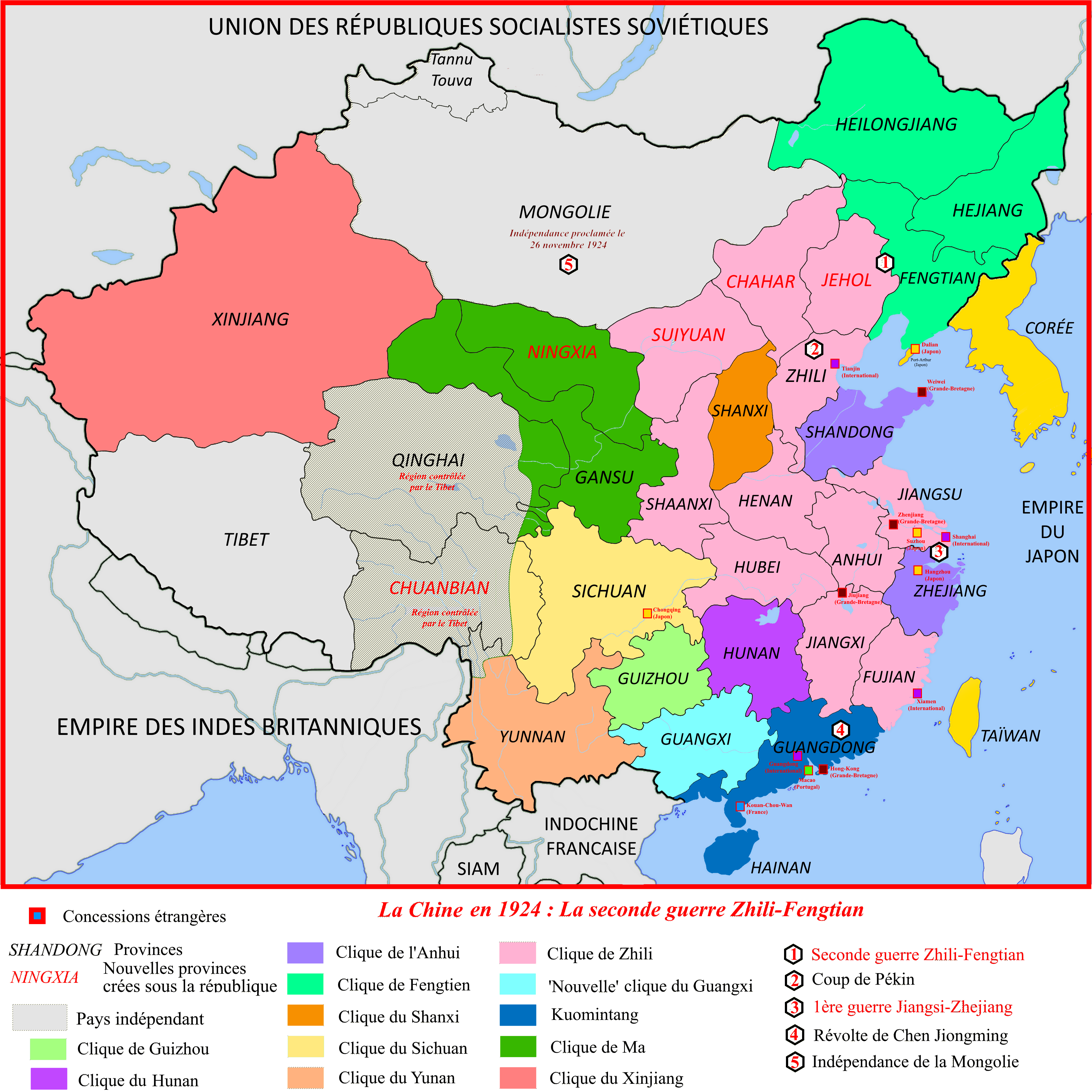
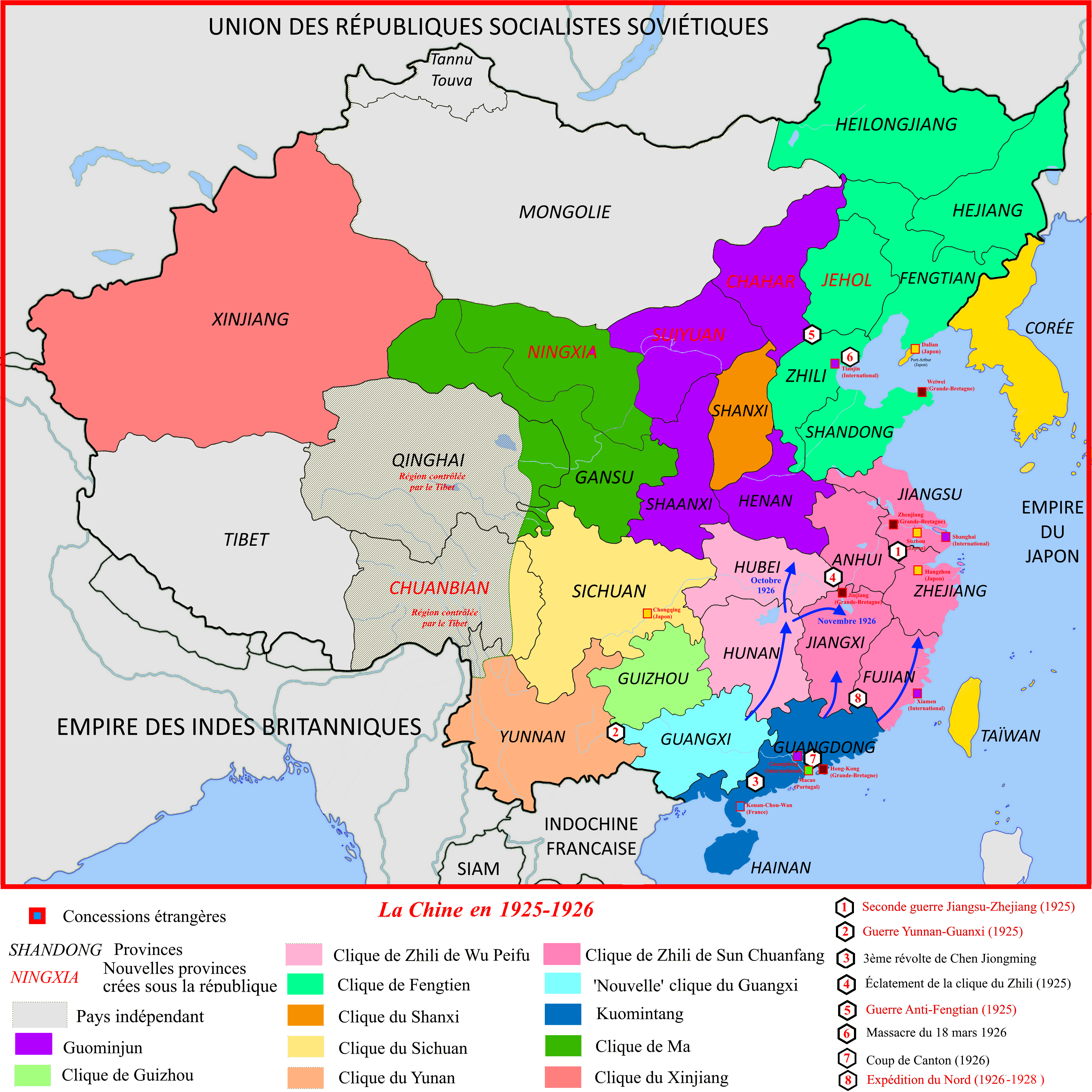
The Republic of China before (left) and after (right) the Second Zhili–Fengtian War:
Fengtian clique control
Zhili clique control
Guominjun control

The unstable political situation kept the Fengtian Army in intermittent action over the next year. A conference held from 11 to 16 November in Tianjin between Zhang, Feng, Duan Qirui, and Lu Yongxiang confirmed Fengtian control of the northeast and set up a new national government under Duan. Brigade commander Kan Zhaoxi was promoted and put in charge of Rehe and Li Jinglin was assigned to Zhili Province. However, the provinces of central and southern China were outside of Zhang and Feng's direct military control and did not fully submit to their authority, although they were hesitant to openly defy it. From December 1924 to late January 1925, Zhang Zongchang had to lead a detachment including the White Russians of the Fengtian foreign legion to put down the rebellious Qi Xieyuan in Jiangsu and Shanghai. The Fengtian Army was victorious, "but their struggles had not clarified the military situation; rather, they had rendered it more complex." It took five more months for the army to complete the Fengtian expansion. In April, Zhang Zongchang took over Shandong and in August Yang Yuting received Jiangsu and Anhui went to Jiang Dengxuan. Although this represented a major extension of Fengtian control, it also marked the beginning of its division into separate forces: Zhang's Shandong Army and Li's Zhili Army were too far from Shenyang to receive direct supervision, and gradually became independent forces.

=== The Anti-Fengtian War ===
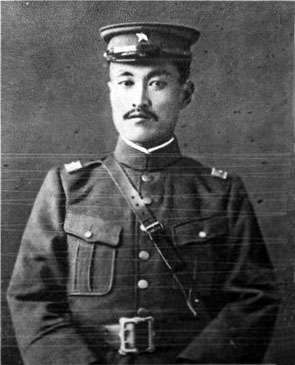
Guo Songling, the Northeastern Army officer who led a mutiny against Zhang Zuolin in 1925

The lack of a single dominant faction made the resumption of large-scale conflict inevitable. In October, Wu Peifu re-emerged as military governor of Hubei and was set on returning to national leadership. That same month, independent military governor of Zhejiang, Sun Chuanfang, invaded Jiangsu and Anhui. He quickly defeated Yang Yuting and Jiang Dengxuan and began to fight with Zhang Zongchang over Shandong. Adding to the Fengtian Army's difficulties, the division of spoils had exacerbated existing tensions in the command. Guo Songling, a leader of the reformist Baoding faction, was frustrated that he had been passed over for promotion. Only one member of his faction, Li Jinglin, had received a military governorship: Zhang and Kan were "old" men and Yang and Jiang, while new men, were members of the Tokyo-educated faction. Guo wanted to replace Zhang Zuolin with Zhang Xueliang, who had been Guo's student at the Military Academy of the Three Eastern Provinces and looked up to Guo as a friend and mentor. Most likely with tacit support from Li Jinglin and Feng Yuxiang, Guo revolted on 22 November. He was in command of 70,000 of the Fengtian Army's best troops and seized the Shanhai Pass to divide Zhang in Shenyang from the rest of his army. Guo marched north to put Shenyang under siege, imprisoning Jiang Dengxuan and over thirty other Fengtian commanders along the way. Jiang, one of Guo's main rivals for influence, was shot. Feng Yuxiang joined the war on 27 November. However, Zhang Zongchang remained loyal to Zhang Zuolin and Li Jinglin backed away from supporting Guo, fighting the Guominjun and leaving Guo without the forces or supplies he needed to take Shenyang. With the help of the Japanese, Zhang was able to defeat Guo's demoralized forces and retake control of Manchuria by the end of 1925. Besides depriving Zhang of some of his most capable commanders (such as Guo and Jiang), the rebellion showed Zhang how contingent the loyalty of his other officers was on his immediate fortunes. Of particular note were Li Jinglin and Zhang Zongchang, whose distance from Shenyang made them virtually independent.

During Guo's rebellion, the Guominjun had managed to drive Li Jinglin out of Zhili Province and Kan Zhaoxi out of Rehe in spite of the Second Army's dogged resistance. Now that Guo had been defeated, Fengtian began to retake territory. They allied themselves with Wu Peifu, who was leading an army allied with the Red Spears. A general offensive forced the Guominjun to retreat from Beijing in March, although with its army intact. In a major show of its logistical sophistication and proficiency with modern tactics, the Fengtian Army employed concentrated heavy artillery to overcome the next line of Guominjun defenses at Nankou. Nonetheless, Feng Yuxiang's army was able to mostly retreat into the rugged terrain of the northwest until the Northern Expedition began to change the military calculus.

=== The Northern Expedition and death of Zhang Zuolin ===
Routes of the Northern Expedition

While Wu Peifu had been fighting alongside the Fengtian Army against the Guominjun, the Kuomintang had taken advantage of the situation to launch the Northern Expedition. They targeted Wu first, and with the advice of Mikhail Borodin and Vasily Blyukher, Nationalist Commander-in-Chief Chiang Kai-shek won a series of rapid victories. Surprised by the KMT advance (Zhang was increasingly concerned with what he perceived as the rise of Communist influence in China), the Fengtian clique offered its support to Wu but was refused. Wu feared that the northern warlords would undermine his position if he allowed their troops into his territory. By 2 September, the NRA had nearly surrounded Wuchang. Whilst Wu and most of his army fled north to Henan province, his remaining troops in the walled city held out for over a month. His failure in the face of the NRA, however, left his hold on power and reputation broken. What remained of his army would disintegrate in the following months. In November, Zhang called a conference of the remaining conservative warlords—Yan Xishan, Sun Chuanfang, Zhang Zongchang, and Chu Yupu—to declare the establishment of a unified National Pacification Army (NPA), of which he became the commander-in-chief. Sun and Zhang Zhongchang were appointed deputy commanders of the new force, and its headquarters was established in the Pukou–Nanjing area. In total the NPA counted 500,000 men, 100,000 of which was the Fengtian Army (excluding those portions based in Zhili and Shandong provinces, which by this point were functionally separate commands). In early 1927, the forces of the NPA engaged the National Revolutionary Army (NRA) in Henan and Jiangsu.

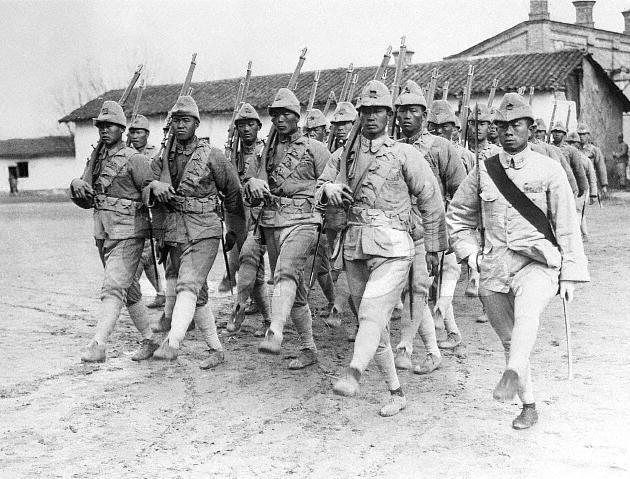
Forces under the command of Zhang Zongchang, 1927

Despite some victories in the field, the NPA faced a continuing series of major setbacks. The Japanese had supported Zhang at several key points in the past in order to gain his acquiescence to their economic ambitions in Manchuria, but Zhang's growing power threatened to free him from any reliance on their aid. Japanese diplomats had concluded that allowing the KMT to win and forcing Zhang back to Manchuria was preferable to letting Zhang unite China under his personal control. In May 1927, Japanese Colonel Doihara Kenji asked Yan Xishan to establish peace between the NRA and the NPA and "take over northern China". Confident of Japanese support, Yan defected to the KMT. This had the short term effect of forcing the NPA to abandon Henan to the NRA. The British, while less than optimistic about the KMT, were forced by the economic pressure of the Canton–Hong Kong strike to make an effort to appease them. In addition to other concessions, they turned a cold shoulder to Zhang's requests for financial aid. Things began to look up for Zhang after Chiang's purge of the Communists, and Nanjing began to enter into negotiations with Nanjing to split China. The Fengtian Army inflicted 100,000 casualties on an ill-planned offensive by the Wuhan government's troops in May. However, negotiations ultimately went nowhere and the Fengtian Army was unable to eradicate the Guominjun during the respite they had been granted. In August, Sun Chuanfang launched an offensive into Jiangsu that seized Xuzhou and briefly put the NRA on the defensive, but by the end of the month he was in retreat and lost 50,000 men in September. Likewise, the Fengtian Army had some initial success against Yan Xishan, but by October, Yan had begun his own offensive along the Beijing-Suiyuan Railroad. A major offensive by the reunited NRA began in November, rolling back what remained of Sun's gains and driving all the way to Shandong. Despite Fengtian reinforcements in the form of air support and 60,000 soldiers, the united forces of Sun and Zhang Zongchang were unable to halt the Kuomintang advance. Sun's Long-Hai railroad front subsequently disintegrated and the NPA were forced to retreat to Shandong and dig in.

The severely weakened National Pacification Army continued to be pushed back throughout 1928. A coalition of Chiang, Feng, Yan, and Li Zongren surrounded it to the south, and Yan's forces flanked it to the west. The NPA had planned to retake Henan, but they were in no position to do so. In mid-April, Yan launched an offensive against the Fengtian Army and drove them out of Shuozhou. Nearly one million soldiers participated in the battle along the railway connecting Shanxi with Beijing. In order to immobilize the railways and artillery on trains, Yan and Feng launched a joint siege of Shijiazhuang, a major railway hub, which fell on 9 May. Yan took Zhangjiakou on 25 May. Feng's forces were moving up the Beijing–Hankou railway, forcing the NPA to split their defense. In April, the Shandong front collapsed as Zhang Zongchang was fully defeated. As NRA forces reached Beijing, Zhang directed 200,000 men to hold the southern front. Although this succeeded in pushing Feng back to Dingzhou, the Guominjun was victorious on the eastern front and immediately moved to sever NPA communications. The Japanese, anxious for Zhang to preserve what was left of his forces so that the NRA would not be able to invade Manchuria unopposed, threatened that they would block Zhang Zuolin from retreating if he allowed himself to be defeated in an engagement. As a result, Zhang decided on 3 June to retreat beyond the passes. As he was returning to Manchuria on 4 June 1928, his train was blown up by officers of the Kwantung Army.

=== Early Nanjing Decade ===
The Northeastern Army began to serve under the National Revolutionary Army flag after 1928.

Zhang Xueliang succeeded his father as leader of the Fengtian Clique. On 1 July 1928, he announced an armistice with the Nationalists and proclaimed that he would not interfere with reunification. This was the opposite of what the Japanese had expected and they demanded that Zhang proclaim Manchurian independence. He refused, and on 3 July, Chiang Kai-shek arrived in Beijing to negotiate a peaceful settlement. On 29 December, Zhang Xueliang announced the replacement of all flags in Manchuria with the flag of Nationalist China, symbolically marking the reunification of the Republic and ending the Northern Expedition. But although the NPA was formally dissolved and the erstwhile Fengtian Army was renamed the "Northeastern Border Defense Army", it retained its internal structure and autonomy. Zhang, like the other warlords who had declared their allegiance to Chiang, was de facto independent of the central government.

The decision to join with the KMT left important Fengtian commanders dissatisfied. Yang Yuting, who had been put in charge of military strategy in July, reluctantly went along but felt that Fengtian–KMT unity would not last. He advised Zhang Xueliang to hold the line east of Shanhai Pass and Rehe Province, as well as asking for him to take control of the remnants of Sun Chuanfang's and Zhang Zongchang's armies, each consisting of over 50,000 men, who were now situated between Tangshan and Shanhai Pass. Yang wanted to capitalize on KMT disagreements and infighting in order to prepare for a comeback of the NPA. But Zhang did not want to pursue this course of action, and he began to suspect Yang of plotting a coup with the Japanese. In January 1929, Zhang ordered Yang's execution, along with that of one of Yang's associates, Heilongjiang governor Chang Yinhuai. This ended the influence of Japanese-educated clique of officers and helped Zhang consolidate his control.

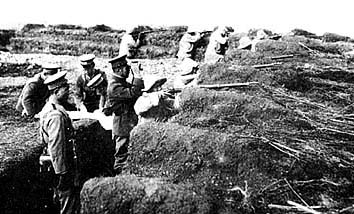
The Northeastern Army during the Sino-Soviet Conflict, 1929

Nonetheless, the Northeastern Army was not in a strong position in 1929. The financial burden of supporting the army and its many wars had had a crushing impact on the Manchurian economy, especially during Zhang Zuolin's final years. Zhang Xueliang was forced to cut down on the army's size and funding to the Mukden Arsenal. Meanwhile, petty warlords began to assert their control over parts of Manchuria and Zhang came under intense pressure from Soviet and Japanese imperialism. He allowed himself to be convinced by Chiang Kai-shek to seize sole control of the Chinese Eastern Railway (CER) by force, which for the last few years had been under joint Soviet and Chinese management. This led to the Sino-Soviet Conflict throughout the second half of 1929. The Northeastern Army was outmaneuvered and outfought by the Red Army. Chinese soldiers alienated the local population by killing civilians and forcefully requisitioning supplies. Several thousand were killed or captured and Zhang had to accept a return to the status quo ante bellum.

In 1929, the Central Plains War began between the Nanjing government and a coalition of northern warlords resisting demilitarization. Zhang Xueliang was courted by both sides because the Northeastern Army was strong enough to swing the balance of power in either direction. He eventually sided with the Nationalists in return for a 10 million yuan bribe and the promise that he'd be able to administer all of China north of the Yellow River. In mid-September, he marched 100,000 Northeastern soldiers to occupy the Beijing-Tianjin area, taking control of the local railroads and customs revenue. Although this won the war for the Nationalists, it left North China outside central administrative control. Chiang tacitly accepted warlord autonomy in return for their official subservience to Nanjing. Zhang began to play host to political dissents in Hubei, including Communist sympathizers.

=== Japanese invasion of Manchuria ===
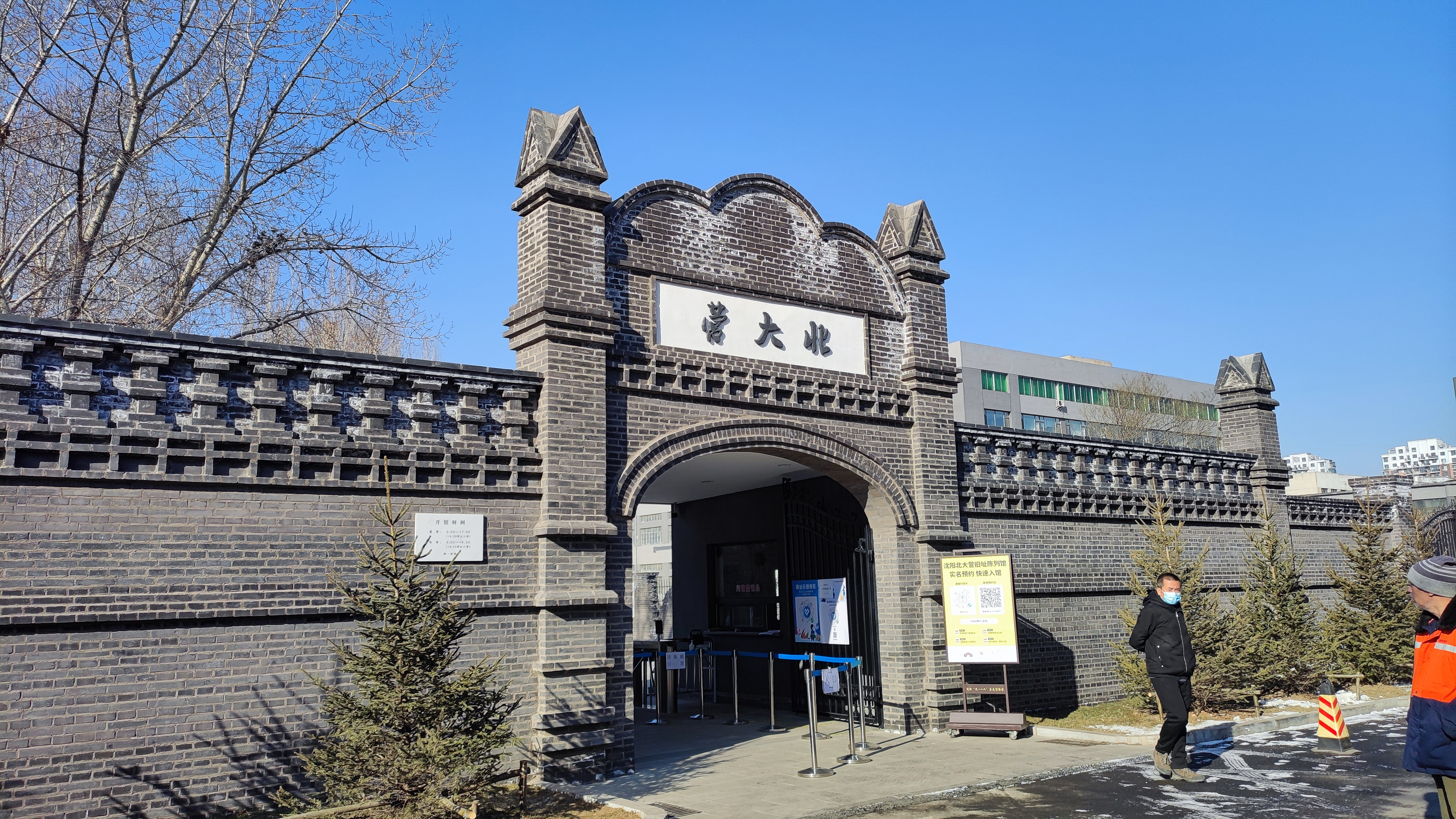
The Northeastern Army's Beidaying Barracks, now a National Historic Site, was the site of the first attack during the Japanese invasion of Manchuria.

Chinese unification threatened Japanese economic and military interests in Manchuria, and forced the question of whether to intervene in China to a head. Radical junior officers of the Kwantung Army, led by Kanji Ishiwara and Seishirō Itagaki, planned and executed the Mukden Incident on September 18, 1931, to give the Japanese an excuse to invade. On the night following the incident, the Kwantung Army crossed the border and captured the Mukden Arsenal and Beidaying Barracks in Shenyang. The Northeastern Army heavily outnumbered the Japanese on paper but decided to withdraw for several reasons. For one, almost half of the army (over 100,000 soldiers) was south of the Great Wall helping suppress a rebellion by Shi Yousan that had flared up in the aftermath of the Central Plains War. Zhang Xueliang was away in Beijing receiving treatment for his opium addiction. The Kwantung Army had superior training and weaponry, and the advisors they had embedded in the Northeastern Army gave them copious intelligence on Chinese movements. Most importantly, Chiang Kai-shek ordered Zhang to localize the incident and allow time for negotiations rather than resist. The offer to negotiate was initially accepted by Japanese Foreign Minister Kijūrō Shidehara, but plans collapsed when the Kwantung Army kept advancing. Within a few days, it had occupied cities along the length of the South Manchuria Railway and coerced or bribed the governors of Fengtian and Jilin Provinces to declare independence. The Japanese then declared the formation of the puppet state of Manchukuo out of the Three Eastern Provinces. The Northeastern Army mostly withdrew south of the Great Wall, but cavalry commander Ma Zhanshan led a doomed but highly publicized resistance campaign in Heilongjiang until early 1932. Ma briefly defected to Manchukuo and got himself appointed Minister of War before stealing a truck convoy of supplies and joining the resistance against the Japanese.

The Northeastern Army subsequently took up positions in Rehe Province. Although the Kwantung Army paused their advance to consolidate in Manchuria, tensions ran high between the Northeastern Army and the Japanese garrisons stationed in north China as part of the Boxer Protocol. Fighting between the Japanese Shanhai Pass garrison and He Zhuguo's Ninth Brigade broke out several times in late 1932. On 1 January 1933, The Japanese launched a full-scale assault and took the pass. Over the next two months Zhang Xueliang and the central government scrambled to organize an effective defense of the rest of Rehe. The province was under General Tang Yulin, nominally Zhang's subordinate but independent enough that he could not easily be replaced. Tang was known as both corrupt and militarily incompetent, and had to be bribed by T. V. Soong before agreeing to fight. 70,000 additional Northeastern Army troops and volunteers battalions were transferred to Rehe to bring the total force there to 100,000. According to historian Parks Coble, however, the efforts of Zhang and the central government were "largely a veneer". The central government provided insufficient funds and no additional troops, and the troops provided by Zhang were his least reliable units. When the Japanese invaded with 30,000 troops on 27 February, Tang Yulin and the other Northeastern commanders, Zhu Chinglan and Wan Fulin, fled rather than fighting. Only Sun Dianying, an old Guominjun commander, attempted a vigorous resistance. Zhang Xueliang resigned on March 10 under intense pressure from the public, and the Northeastern Army was divided up and reorganized into the standard structure used by the NRA. At the top level, it was divided into four new armies: the Fifty-First Army under Yu Xuezhong, the Fifty-Third under Wan Fulin, the Fifty-Seventh under He Zhuguo, and the Sixty-Seventh under Wang Shuchang. Although the number of troops they contained did not actually change, brigades were renamed as divisions to fit the NRA pattern (100 was added to their brigade number, e.g. the 17th Brigade became the 117th Division). Zhang himself left on a tour of Europe. Japanese aggression continued after the fall of Rehe. Northeastern Army soldiers under He Zhuguo and Weng Zhaoyuan faced offensives in April and May that pushed them back from the Luan River. Hostilities only concluded with the Tanggu Truce, signed on 31 May. In the second half of 1933, the majority of the Northeastern Army was transferred to Shaanxi and took up headquarters at Xi'an. The 30,000 troops of the Fifty-First Army remained in Hebei until the Japanese demanded their withdrawal.

=== Xi'an Incident and dissolution ===
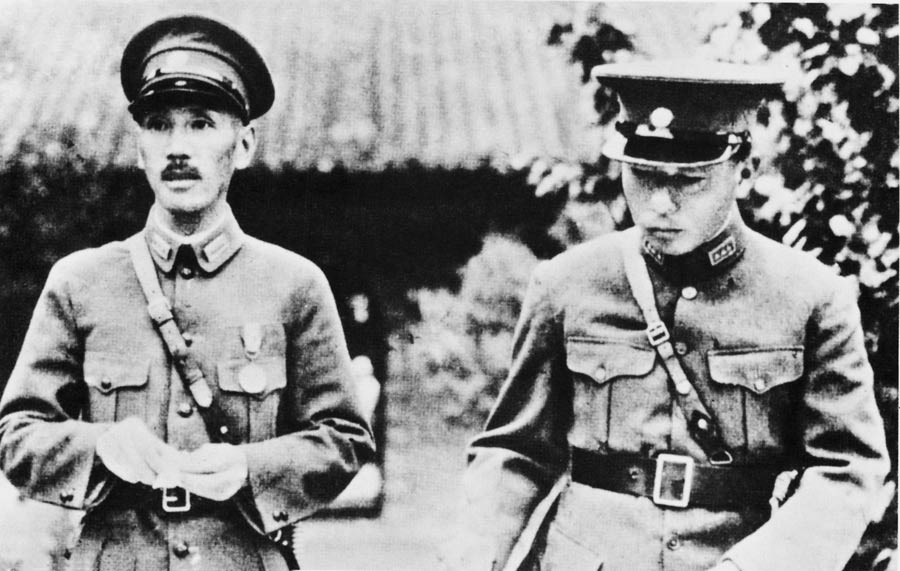
Chiang and Zhang around the time of the Xi'an Incident

In October 1935, the Chinese Communists (CCP) arrived in Gansu and Ningxia following the Long March. The Northeastern Army was tasked with finishing off the Communists with the help of the forces of local Warlord Yang Hucheng, (Note: Officially the NRA's Seventeenth Route Army) forming the Northwest Bandit (Note: The Chinese Communists were referred to as "red bandits" in contemporary Nationalist propaganda.) Suppression Force. Promised an easy victory, the Bandit Suppression Force was surprised and dismayed when the Red Army defeated it in two engagements in September and October. The men, already frustrated by this diversion from fighting Japan, began to lose their will to fight when POWs returned with stories of good treatment and the message that the Communists wanted to form an alliance against the Japanese. With the help of Communist-sympathetic officers, they pressed Zhang and Yang to negotiate a truce. The generals were open to the idea and invited official CCP representatives to begin negotiations in late 1935. The Red Army followed up on their promise to fight the Japanese by launching the "eastern expedition" from February to April 1936. They announced that a detachment was marching through Shanxi to fight the Japanese in Rehe and Hebei. Letting the Red Army through would have broken the encirclement, so Yan Xishan stopped them by force. Although defeated militarily, the Red Army convinced the Shanxi peasantry of their patriotism and gained 8,000 new recruits on their retreat. Zhang Xueliang was likewise impressed. When Mao announced on 14 March that the Communists were willing to conclude a formal truce, Zhang secretly agreed. By June 1936, the secret agreement between Zhang and the CCP had been successfully settled. He also proposed to Chiang Kai-shek that he reverse policy of "first internal pacification, then external resistance", and focus on military preparation against Japan. When Chiang refused, Zhang began to plot a coup in "great secrecy".

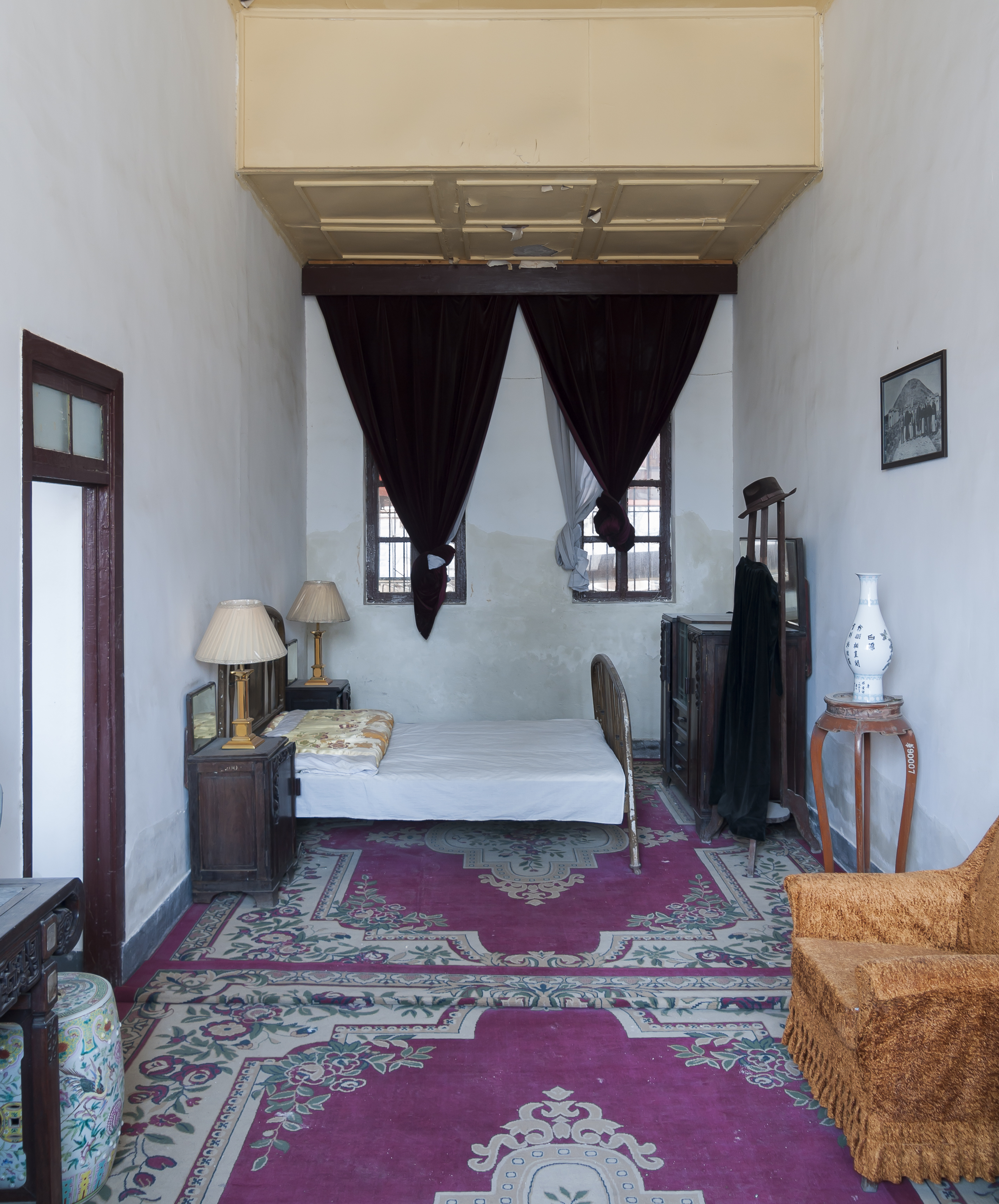
Chiang Kai-shek's bedroom in Xi'an during his captivity

In November 1936, Zhang asked Chiang to come to Xi'an to raise the morale of troops unwilling to fight the Communists. When he arrived, Northeastern soldiers overwhelmed his bodyguard and placed him under house arrest. A faction of the army led by Yang Hucheng and the radical young officers of the "Anti-Japanese Comrade Society" wanted to execute Chiang, but Zhang and the Communists insisted that he be kept alive and convinced to change his policy towards Japan and the Communists. They argued that an alliance with Chiang was their best chance to combat the Japanese, while killing him would only provoke retaliation from the Nanjing Government. The Northeastern Army attempted to broadcast 8 demands to the Chinese public explaining why they arrested Chiang and the conditions for his release, but Nationalist censorship prevented their publication outside the Communist-held areas. Nonetheless, Chiang eventually agreed to negotiate with CCP diplomats Zhou Enlai and Lin Boqu. By late December Chiang had given a verbal promise that he would end the civil war and resist Japanese aggression.

Chiang was released on 26 December and returned to Nanjing with Zhang Xueliang. Although he announced a cease fire in the civil war, he repudiated any promises that he had made in Xi'an. Zhang was imprisoned and charged with treason. Chiang then sent 37 army divisions north to surround the Northeastern Army and force them to stand down. The army was deeply divided on the appropriate response. Yang Hucheng and the Anti-Japanese Comrade Society wanted to stand and fight if the KMT army attacked, and refuse to negotiate until Zhang was released. The Communist representatives strongly disagreed and cautioned that civil war would, in the words of Zhou Enlai, "make China into another Spain". Negotiations between the CCP and Nanjing continued. However, when a conference of Northeastern officers in January 1937 overwhelmingly resolved not to surrender peacefully, the CCP reluctantly decided that they could not abandon their allies and pledged to fight alongside them if the KMT attacked. The situation was again reversed when the five most senior Northeastern generals met separately and decided to surrender. The radical officers were enraged and assassinated one of the generals on 2 February, but this only turned the majority of the soldiers against the plan to stand and fight. The Northeastern Army peacefully surrendered to advancing KMT forces and was divided into new units, which were sent to Hebei, Hunan, and Anhui. Yang Hucheng, however, was arrested and eventually executed, while the leaders of the Anti-Japanese Comrade Society defected to the Red Army. Zhang was kept under house arrest for over 50 years before emigrating to Hawaii in 1993. Chiang did eventually keep his promise to the CCP. After six months of continued negotiations, he signed a formal agreement creating the Second United Front, a military alliance of the Communists and Nationalists against Japan.

== Structure ==
Originally, the Fengtian Army was composed solely of the 27th division. In 1917, the army expanded to include the 28th division (whose commander had been dismissed for supporting the Manchu Restoration) and the newly created 29th division. In theory, these units remained part of the national Beiyang Army, but in reality they answered to Zhang Zuolin alone.

After the army reorganization program undertaken following the First Zhili-Fengtian War, the basic unit became the brigade. Although not strictly observed in practice, brigades were in theory divided into three regiments, each regiment into three battalions, and each battalion into three companies of 150 men each. The total manpower of a standard brigade was therefore around 4,000 men. Brigades were not necessarily subdivisions of divisions. Some were, but most operated as independent mixed brigades in the style of the Japanese Army.

=== Command ===
Command Structure, 1923
Unit or Role	Commander	Location
First Division	General Li Jinglin	Fengtian
Twenty-Seventh Division	General Zhang Zuoxiang	Fengtian
Twenty-Ninth Division	General Wu Junsheng	Heilongjiang
1st Brigade	Lt. General Kan Zhaoxi	Fengtian
2nd Brigade	Lt. General Zhang Xueliang	Fengtian
3rd Brigade	Lt. General Zhang Zongchang	Fengtian
4th Brigade	Lt. General Zhang Zuotao	Fengtian
5th Brigade	Lt. General Li Zhensheng	Fengtian
6th Brigade	Lt. General Guo Songling	Fengtian
7th Brigade	Lt. General Tang Yulin	Fengtian
8th Brigade	Lt. General Chen Yukun	Jilin
9th Brigade	Lt. General Liu Xiangjiu	Jilin
10th Brigade	Lt. General Yu Shencheng	Jilin
11th Brigade	Lt. General Ba Yinge	Heilongjiang
12th Brigade	Lt. General Zhao Enzhen	Fengtian
13th Brigade	Lt. General Ding Zhao	Jilin
14th Brigade	Lt. General Yang Desheng	Fengtian
15th Brigade	Lt. General Wan Fulin	Heilongjiang
16th Brigade	Lt. General Qi Enming	Fengtian
17th Brigade	Lt. General Zhang Mingjiu	Heilongjiang
18th Brigade	Lt. General Zhang Huanxiang	Jilin
19th Brigade	Lt. General Gao Weiyo	Fengtian
20th Brigade	Lt. General Hu Yungkui	Jilin
21st Brigade	Lt. General Cai Yungzhen	Jilin
22nd Brigade	Lt. General Shi Deshan	Heilongjiang
23rd Brigade	Lt. General Li Shuangkai	Fengtian
24th Brigade	Lt. General Xing Shilian	Fengtian
25th Brigade	Lt. General Cai Pingben	Fengtian
26th Brigade	Lt. General Li Guilin	Jilin
27th Brigade	Lt. General Pei Junsheng	Fengtian
1st Cavalry Brigade	Lt. General Mu Qun	Fengtian
2nd Cavalry Brigade	Lt. General Peng Jinshan	Heilongjiang
3rd Cavalry Brigade	Lt. General Su Xilin	Fengtian
4th Cavalry Brigade	Lt. General Zhang Kuijiu	Heilongjiang
5th Cavalry Brigade	Lt. General Chen Fusheng	Heilongjiang

In 1923, the senior staff of the Fengtian Army included commander-in-chief Zhang Zuolin, deputy commanders Sun Liechen and Wu Junsheng, and Yang Yuting as chief of staff. The senior staff in 1929 included commander-in-chief Zhang Xueliang, vice-commander (in Jilin) Zhang Zuoxiang, vice-commander (in Heilongjiang) Wan Fulin, and commander of the Harbin special district Zhang Jinghui. Other notable commanders included:

- Zhang Zongchang – would become commander of the Shandong Army, his reputation for corruption and cruelty led Time magazine to dub him "China's basest warlord."
- Wu Junsheng – Commander of the cavalry and military governor of Heilongjiang until his death alongside Zhang Zuolin in the Huanggutun incident.
- Guo Songling – Artillery officer, teacher at the military college, and mentor of Zhang Xueliang. Would later rebel against Zhang Zuolin.
- Li Jinglin – Commander of the Fengtian clique's Zhili Army and governor of Zhili province 1924–25.
- Chu Yupu – Succeeded Li and Governor of Zhili and commander of the Zhili Army.
- Konstantin Petrovich Nechaev – De facto commander of all White Russian mercenaries who served in the Fengtian armies; official commander of the 65th Infantry Division

=== Naval and Air Forces ===
Although mainly a land-based force, the Northeastern Army also had a small navy and air force. The navy had its origins in the First World War, when China received two captured German gunboats from the allies to help patrol Manchuria's rivers. Under the command of Captain Yin Shuo, these ships would go on to form the core of the Songhua River Flotilla. In 1923, the Flotilla became part of the Northeast Sea Defense Squadron under Vice Admiral Shen Honglie. After the Fengtian victory in the Second Zhili-Fengtian War, Shen was transferred to Shandong under Zhang Zongchang's command. He had returned to Manchuria by 1929 and commanded four gunboats and seven supporting craft. The air force was heavily invested in but remained small and never played a decisive role in the Northeastern Army's engagements. The planes, purchased from the French, numbered no more than 100, and even if this estimate is accurate, most were unfit to fly and a shortage of trained pilots kept others grounded.

== Personnel ==
When Zhang Zuolin was appointed commander of the forward and center route armies of Manchuria in 1911, he brought with him the irregulars he already had under his command. His closest associates became senior officers of the combined force, including Zhang Jinghui, Zhang Zuoxiang, Tang Yulin, and Zuo Fen. Fengtian soldiers were mostly ethnically Chinese and overwhelmingly from Fengtian province, because this was where the 27th division did its recruiting according to the territorial system of recruitment laid out under the Qing. This recruitment system was preserved by Zhang in his early years because of its benefits to unit cohesion. As additional divisions based in other Manchurian provinces were absorbed, the geographical makeup of the army became consequently more diverse. When Li Jinglin and Zhang Zongchang's divisions were relocated to Zhili and Shandong respectively after the Second Zhili-Fengtian War, they began recruiting from the local populations and soon locals made up a majority in both armies. The monthly salary remained the same as it had been under the Qing—in 1922, that was 4.2 yuan for a second-class private. At its height, circa 1926, the Fengtian Army consisted of somewhere between 170,000 and 250,000 men.

The Fengtian Army included a number of foreigners in its ranks as soldiers, officers, and advisors. The most important were the Japanese advisors, who not only provided Zhang with military expertise but—because they retained their positions as officers in the Kwantung Army—also served as intermediaries with the Japanese commanders. The presence of Japanese advisors in Chinese armies predated the establishment of the Fengtian army, and Zhang inherited several from previous Manchurian generals. Several dozen were in service at any one time, some of the most important being Takema Machino, Takeo Kikuchi, and Shigeru Honjō. The largest contingent of foreign soldiers were White Russians who had fled to Manchuria following their defeat in the Russian Civil War. Mercenary service was attractive for White émigrés due to the fact that many of them had problems finding stable employment, and the warlords at least offered a regular income. Led by Konstantin Petrovich Nechaev, the Russians earned a reputation as an extremely capable fighting force, but were also feared due to their high indiscipline and extreme brutality against civilians and prisoners of war. In 1926, the number of Russians reached its peak at about 5,270 men, mostly serving in Nechaev's 65th Infantry Division under Zhang Zongchang. However, they suffered heavy casualties in the 1926–1927 fighting against Sun Chuanfang, and Zhang Xueliang demobilized the remaining White Russian units after they sided with Zhang Zongchang's revolt.

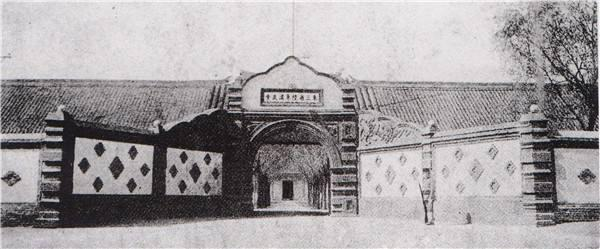
The Military Academy of the Three Eastern Provinces was established to train officers for the Fengtian Army. Zhang Xueliang was a member of the first graduating class.

As mentioned, the original officer core consisted of Zhang's former bandit comrades who were personally loyal to him. But in 1919, the Beiyang government's War Department sponsored the creation of the Military Academy of the Three Eastern Provinces, which Zhang enthusiastically supported. Graduates of the Baoding Military Academy, including artillery officer Guo Songling, were recruited to the faculty. This academy trained 7,971 officers from 1919 to 1930, forming the backbone of the Fengtian's lower- and mid-level officers. Zhang also sent many of his ex-bandit officers, who rarely had formal military training, to study at the academy. In most cases, though, this seemed to have little effect on their accustomed ways of thinking. After the Fengtian Army's defeat in the First Zhili-Fengtian War, it was clear to Zhang and his advisors that the incompetence of these so-called "old men" had been a major contributing factor. Several were removed from command and replaced with "new men", officers who had begun their careers with formal military training. The new men could be broadly separated into two factions. The first, centered around figures who had been educated domestically, either at Baoding Military Academy (Guo Songling, Li Jinglin) or the Military Academy of the Three Eastern Provinces (Zhang Xueliang). The second faction had been educated in Japan at the Imperial Japanese Army Academy. They included Han Linchun, Yang Yuting, and Jiang Dengxuan. Relations between officers of these three factions—the old men and the two groups of new men—were often bitter to the point of threatening to break up the army. The Japanese-educated clique wanted to intervene in Chinese politics more directly and actively, while the Chinese-educated clique opposed many military ventures. The old men, on the other hand, often showed little interest in military affairs other than as a means of personal profit (such as in the case of Kan Zhaoxi). (Note: Zhang Zongchang, a corrupt member of the old clique but nonetheless a competent commander, was an important exception.) Factional rivalries were an important cause of the 1925 rebellion led by Guo Songling, which nearly overthrew Zhang Zuolin. Zhang's ultimate triumph dealt a fatal blow to Guo's Chinese-educated faction, and the final years of Zhang's regime were marked by a return to valuing loyalty above professional skill.

== Equipment ==
During the Warlord Era, modern weaponry was expensive and often difficult to acquire. When created, the Fengtian Army was composed of former bandits armed with what was available. The Hanyang 88, designed based on the German Gewehr 1888, had been the standard infantry rifle under the Qing and was therefore widely available. A smaller quantity of the Type 1 rifle (a Chinese copy of the Mauser Model 1907) were produced towards the end of the Qing and during the early Republican period and may have been used as well. Given Manchuria's location between Russia and Japanese-occupied Korea, other common rifles included the Russian Mosin–Nagant model 1891, various models of the Japanese Murata, and the Japanese Arisakas of 1897 and 1905. Overall, the quality of these weapons were low. The China Yearbook estimated that even in 1924, 80 percent of Chinese rifles generally were "antiquated, badly kept, or in poor condition". A major difficulty for the Fengtian Army was that, at the start of the Warlord Era in 1916, none of the eight Chinese armories capable of producing new armaments were located in Manchuria. Before 1922, the Mukden "Arsenal" was capable of producing only small amounts of ammunition. New supplies came in piecemeal: Zhang received a shipment of arms from Yuan Shikai in 1911, and by agreement with Duan Qirui, seized 17 million yen worth of Japanese military supplies in 1917. To this was added a large amount of Japanese-funded equipment, including cars and airplanes, that were captured from the defeated Anhui Clique in 1920. The cars were particularly valuable: by 1926 there were still only 8,000 motor vehicles in all of China. French Renault FT tanks deployed to Vladivostok during the Allied intervention in the Russian Civil War were given to the Fengtian Army in 1919. Yet after 1919, even these irregular windfalls became less frequent, thanks to an arms embargo on China agreed to by most of the major world powers.

The Fengtian Army's defeat in the First Zhili-Fengtian War spurred Zhang Zuolin to launch a campaign of modernization. He poured over 17 million yuan into expanding and improving the Mukden Arsenal, which was overseen by a series of talented superintendents: Tao Zhiping in 1922, Han Linchun in 1923, and Yang Yuting beginning in 1924. By 1924, the budget of the Mukden Arsenal was 2 million yuan per month; an enormous investment compared with the Hanyang Arsenal's annual 1916 operating budget of just over a million yuan (before the Warlord Era, the Hanyang Arsenal was the largest in China). The arsenal employed a workforce of 20–30,000 that included thousands of foreign specialists brought in from across the globe. The main rifle in production was the Mukden Arsenal Mauser, a copy of the Arisaka tweaked by Han Linchun. An English arms manufacturer, Francis Sutton, was paid to build a state-of-the-art trench mortar works nearby (Liaoning Trench Mortar Arsenal), and he helped Zhang set up a smuggling operation through Shandong. Fengtian was also China's single largest arms importer. It purchased weapons from Germany, France, Italy, and especially Japan. Important imports included the Type 3 heavy machine gun from Japan and 14 more Renaults from France. The Fengtian Army also made effective use of other modern weaponry, such as mines, barbed-wire, armored trains, and tanks. Starting in 1925, a chemical weapons plant was built in Mukden and Zhang Zuolin hired German and Russian experts to produce chlorine, phosgene and mustard gas. Additional Fengtian-controlled arsenals included one built in Heilongjiang in 1924 and two based in Jinan that were acquired after the Second Zhili-Fengtian War. By 1928, the newly constructed arsenals in Manchuria could rival and in some cases exceed the output of the rest of China combined. Every month in 1928, the Fengtian Clique produced 7,500 rifles, 70–80 machine guns, 120,000 artillery shells, and about 9 million cartridges, among other equipment. But this extraordinarily high output put an unsustainable strain on the Manchurian economy. After 1929, Zhang Xueliang was forced to cut funding to the arsenal.

Fengtian Army Equipment
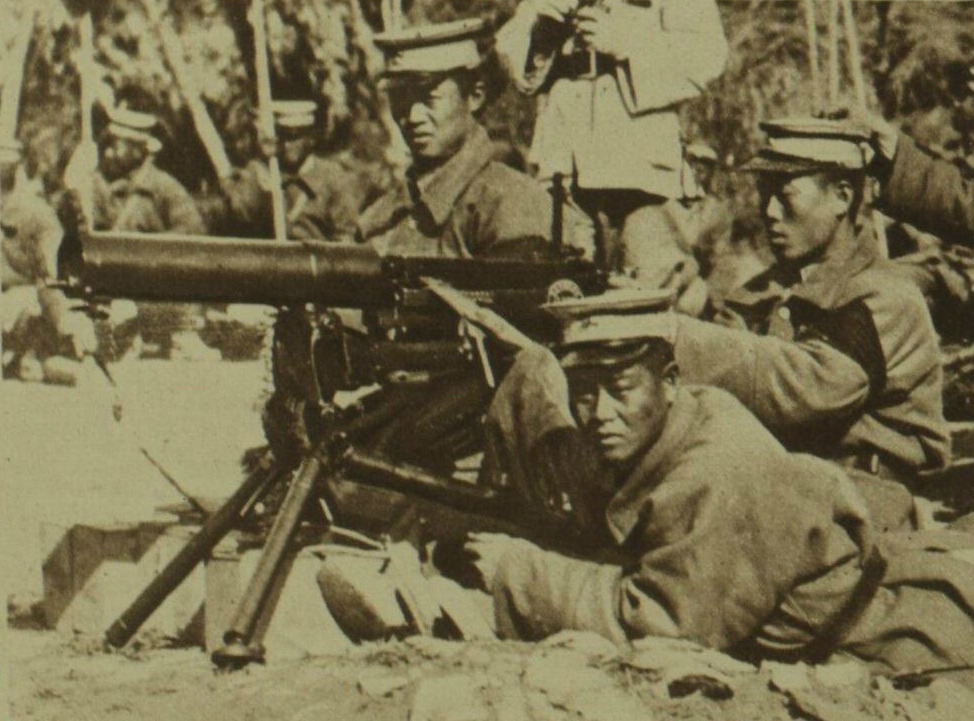
Machine guns were not used to their full potential. In 1924, a foreign observer was surprised by the failure to use Maxim guns to spread enfilading fire or harass enemy supply lines.

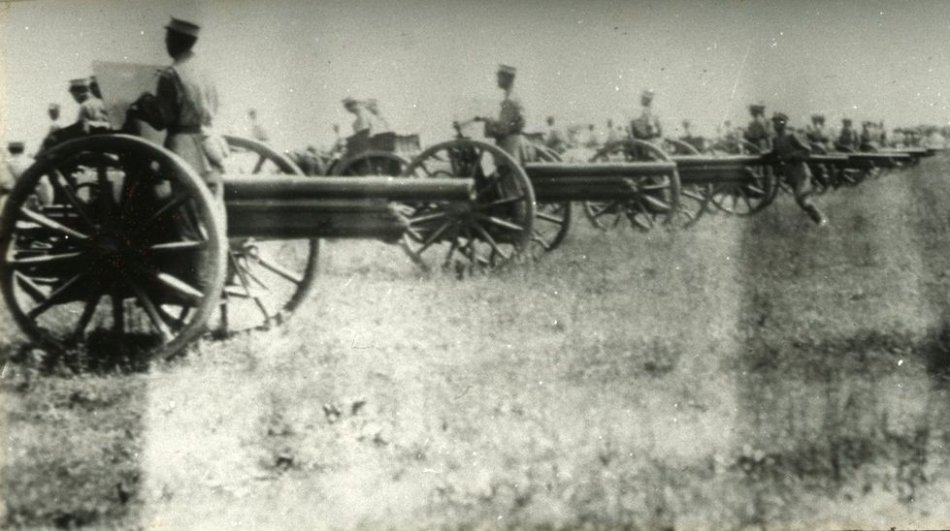
By 1927, the Fengtian Army was estimated to have 8 field gun regiments, including seven using 77mm guns and one with 150mm guns.

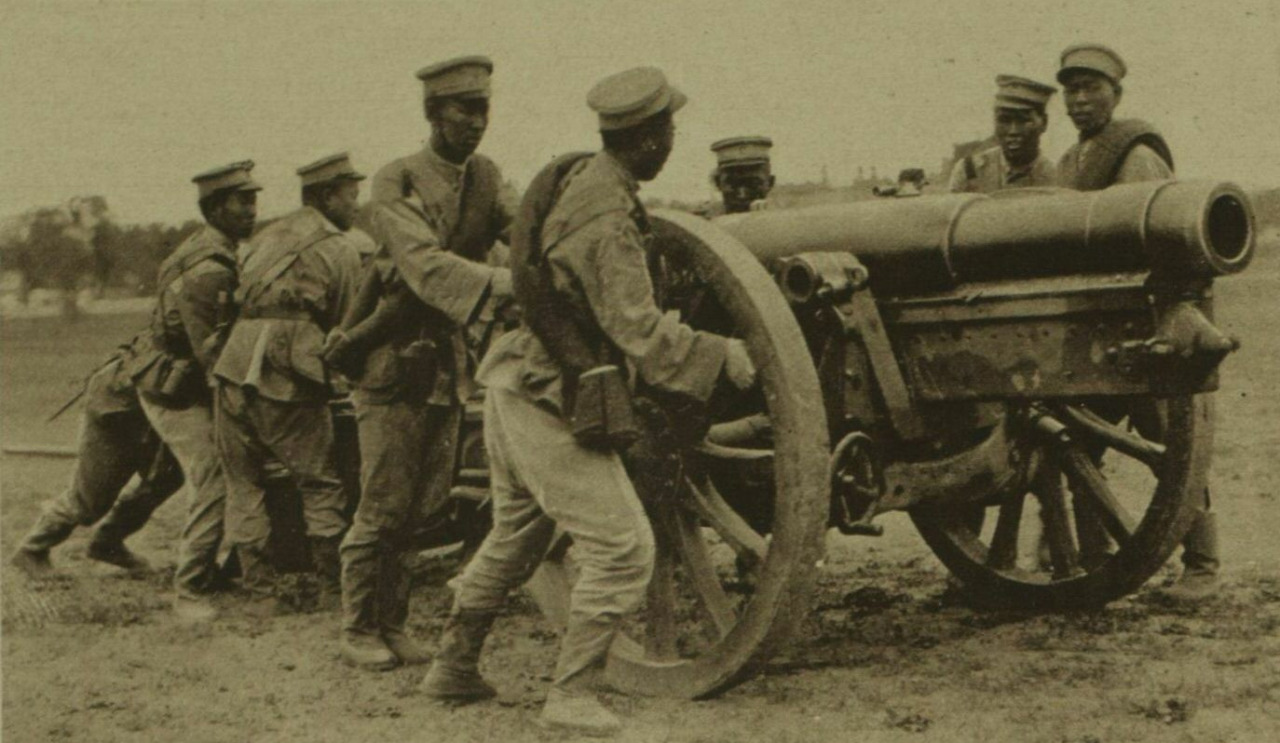
The Northeastern Army made heavy and effective use of field artillery. This contributed to a decline in siege tactics which had been frequent in Chinese wars of the 19th Century.

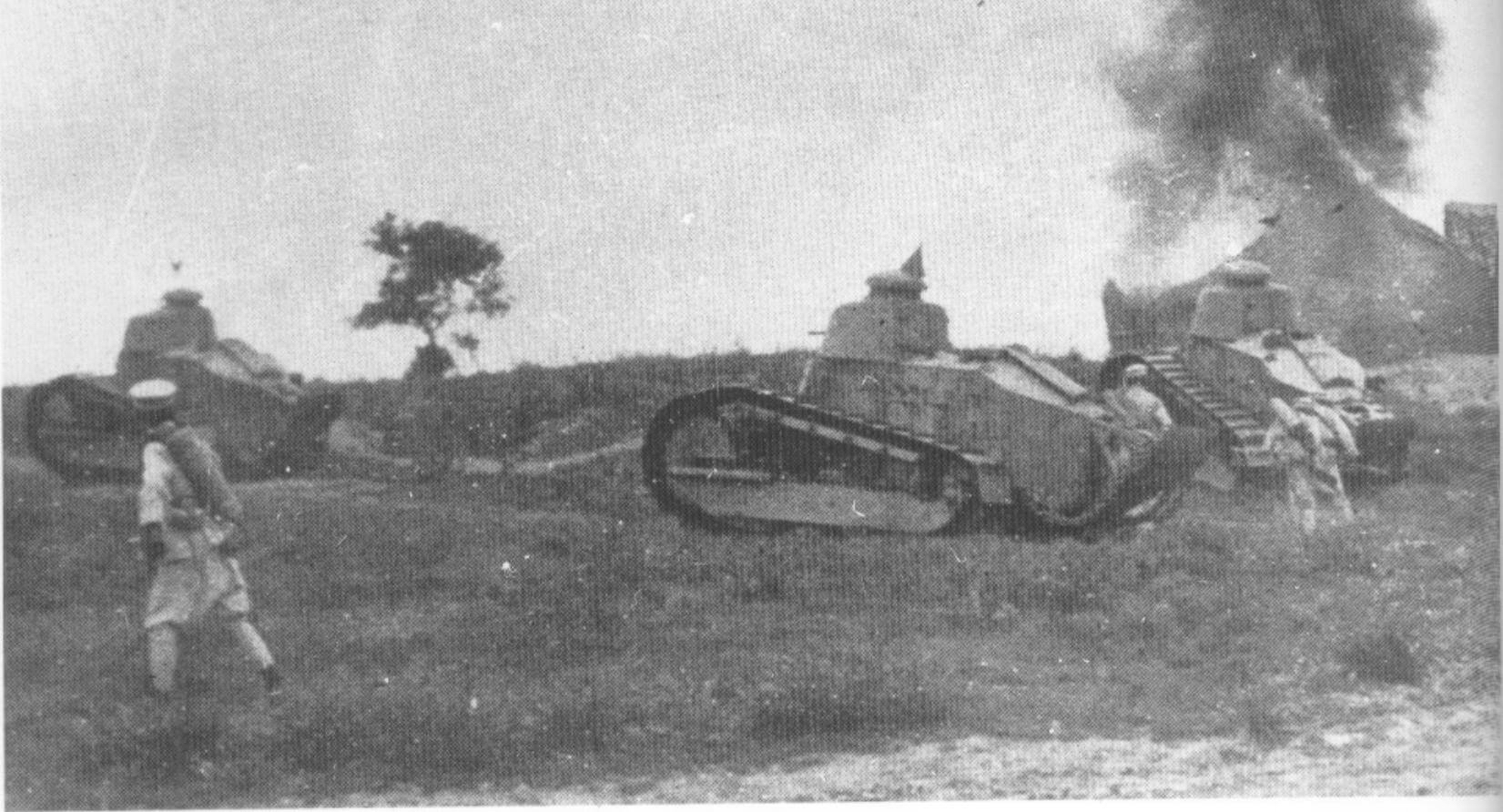
The Northeastern Army used Renault FT-17 tanks against Wu Peifu in 1926 and later during the 1929 Sino-Soviet conflict, but they were nearly all captured during the Japanese invasion of Manchuria.

== See also ==
- Outline of the Chinese Civil War
- Order of battle Defense of the Great Wall: shows the command structure of the Northeastern Army in 1933
- Zhili Army: a breakoff of the Fengtian Army based in Zhili province, 1924–1928
- Other Armies in Warlord Era China:

- National Pacification Army
- Guominjun
- National Revolutionary Army

== Bibliography ==
- United States. Department of State (1926). Papers Relating to the Foreign Relations of the United States. U.S. Government Printing Office.
- United States. War Dept. General Staff (1978). United States military intelligence [1917–1927]. Garland Pub. ISBN 978-0-8240-3025-4.
- Hu, T. Y. (March 1929). "The 'Double Execution'". The Chinese Students' Monthly. Vol. 24, no. 5.
- Barnouin, Barbara; Yu, Changgen (2006). Zhou Enlai: A Political Life. Hong Kong: The Chinese University Press.
- Coble, Parks M. (1991). Facing Japan: Chinese Politics and Japanese Imperialism, 1931–1937. Cambridge, Massachusetts: Harvard University Press.
- Clubb, Edmund O. (1978). 20th century China (Third ed.). New York: Columbia University Press. ISBN 9780231045186.
- Jansen, Marius (1975). Japan and China: From War to Peace: 1895-1972. Chicago: Rand McNally.
- Huang, Tzu-chin (2016). "Embracing mainstream international society: Chiang Kai-shek's diplomatic strategy against Japan". Chinese Studies in History. 49 (4).
- Chen, Weiming; Davis, Barbara (2000). Taiji Sword. North Atlantic Books. ISBN 978-1-55643-333-7.
- Ch'en, Jerome (1979). The Military-Gentry Coalition: China Under the Warlords. Toronto: University of Toronto-York University Joint Centre on Modern East Asia.
- Eastman, Lloyd E. (1991). "Nationalist China during the Nanking decade, 1927–1937". The Nationalist Era in China, 1927–1949. New York: Cambridge University Press.
- Ch'en, Jerome (1991). "The Communist movement, 1927–1937". The Nationalist Era in China, 1927–1949. New York: Cambridge University Press.
- Elleman, Bruce A. (1994). The Soviet Union's Secret Diplomacy Concerning the Chinese Eastern Railway, 1924–1925. Journal of Asian Studies, Vol. 53.
- Dixon, Jeffrey S.; Sarkees, Meredith Reid (18 September 2015). A Guide to Intra-state Wars: An Examination of Civil, Regional, and Intercommunal Wars, 1816–2014. SAGE Publications. ISBN 978-1-5063-0081-8.
- Dunne, Andrew P. (1996). International Theory: To the Brink and Beyond. Greenwood Publishing Group. ISBN 978-0-313-30078-3.
- Chan, Anthony B. (2010). Arming the Chinese: The Western Armaments Trade in Warlord China, 1920–28 (2nd ed.). Vancouver, Toronto: University of British Columbia Press.
- Bisher, Jamie (2005). White Terror: Cossack Warlords of the Trans-Siberian. London, New York City: Routledge.
- Boorman, Howard L; Howard, Richard C., eds. (1970). Biographical dictionary of Republican China, Volume 3: Mao to Wu. New York: Columbia University Press.
- Fenby, Jonathan (2004). Generalissimo: Chiang Kai-shek and the China He Lost. London: Simon & Schuster. ISBN 0743231449.
- Chi, Hsi-Cheng (1976). Warlord Politics in China: 1916-1928. Stanford, California: Stanford University Press.
- Bonavia, David (1995). China's warlords. Hong Kong: Oxford University Press. ISBN 0195861795.
- Fischer, Louis (1930). The Soviets in World Affairs: A History of Relations Between the Soviet Union and the Rest of the World. Vol. 2. London: J. Cape. OCLC 59836788.
- Dreyer, Edward (1995). China at war, 1901–1949. New York: Longman.
- Itoh, Mayumi (3 October 2016). The Making of China's War with Japan: Zhou Enlai and Zhang Xueliang. Springer. ISBN 978-981-10-0494-0.
- Jaques, Tony (2007). Dictionary of Battles and Sieges: P-Z. Greenwood Publishing Group. ISBN 978-0-313-33539-6.
- Jordan, Donald (1976). The northern expedition : China's national revolution of 1926-1928. Honolulu: University Press of Hawaii. ISBN 978-0-8248-8087-3. OCLC 657972971.
- Jowett, Philip S. (2017). The Bitter Peace. Conflict in China 1928–37. Stroud: Amberley Publishing. ISBN 978-1445651927.
- Jowett, Philip S. (2014). The Armies of Warlord China 1911–1928. Atglen, Pennsylvania: Schiffer Publishing. ISBN 9780764343452.
- Jowett, Philip (2010). Chinese Warlord Armies 1911–30. Men-at-Arms 306 (Illustrated ed.). Osprey Publishing.
- Jowett, Philip (15 July 1997). Chinese Civil War Armies 1911–49. Men-at-Arms 306. Osprey Publishing. ISBN 9781855326651.
- Kwong, Chi Man (2017). War and Geopolitics in Interwar Manchuria. Zhang Zuolin and the Fengtian Clique during the Northern Expedition. Leiden: Brill Publishers.
- Ness, Leland; Shih, Bin (July 2016). Kangzhan: Guide to Chinese Ground Forces 1937–45. Helion & Company. ISBN 9781910294420.
- Malmassari, Paul (2016) [1989]. Armoured Trains. An Illustrated Encyclopedia 1825–2016. Translated by Roger Branfill-Cook. Barnsley: Seaforth Publishing (Pen and Sword Books). ISBN 978-1848322622.
- McCormack, Gavan (1977). Chang Tso-lin in Northeastern China, 1911-1928: China, Japan, and the Manchurian Idea. Stanford, California: Stanford University Press. ISBN 0-8047-0945-9.
- Patrikeeff, Felix (2002). "Russian Politics in Exile: The Northeast Asian Balance of Power, 1924–1931". Manchurian Railways and the Opening of China: An International History. Basingstoke.
- Pye, Lucien (1971). Warlord Politics: Conflict and Coalition in the modernization of Republican China. New York: Praeger Publishers.
- Sheridan, James (1975). China in Disintegration: The Republican Era in Chinese History, 1912–1949. New York: Free Press.
- Snow, Edgar (1978). Red Star Over China (Revised and Enlarged ed.). New York: Grove Press.
- Taylor, Jay (2009). The Generalissimo: Chiang Kai-shek and the Struggle for Modern China. Harvard University Press. ISBN 978-0-674-03338-2.
- Thorne, Christopher (1973). The Limits of Foreign Policy; the West, the League, and the Far Eastern Crisis of 1931-1933. New York: Putnam. ISBN 9780399111242.
- Tong, Yong (2012). Li, Xiaobing (ed.). China at War: An Encyclopedia. Santa Barbara, California: ABC-CLIO, LLC.
- Vishnyakova-Akimova, Vera Vladimirovna (1971). Two Years in Revolutionary China, 1925–1927. Translated by Stephen I. Levine. Cambridge, Massachusetts: Harvard University Press. ISBN 978-0674916012.
- Waldron, Arthur (1995). From War to Nationalism: China's Turning Point, 1924-1925. New York: Cambridge University Press. ISBN 0521472385.
- Waldron, Arthur; Cull, Nicholas (1995). "'Modern Warfare in China in 1924–1925': Soviet film propaganda to support Chinese Militarist Zhang Zuolin". Historical Journal of Film, Radio and Television. 15 (3). Abingdon-on-Thames: Routledge: 407–424. doi:10.1080/01439689500260291.
- Walker, Michael (2017). The 1929 Sino-Soviet War. Lawrence, Kansas: University Press of Kansas.
- Wang, Ke-wen (1998). Modern China: An Encyclopedia of History, Culture, and Nationalism. Taylor & Francis. ISBN 978-0-419-22160-9.
- Wilbur, C. Martin (1983). The Nationalist Revolution in China, 1923-1928. New York: Cambridge University Press.
- Worthing, Peter (2016). General He Yingqin: The Rise and Fall of Nationalist China. Cambridge: Cambridge University Press. ISBN 9781107144637.
- Zaloga, Steven J. (2011). Armored Trains. Oxford: Osprey Publishing.
- Zaloga, Steven J. (1988). The Renault FT Light Tank. Vanguard 46. London: Osprey Publishing Ltd. ISBN 9780850458527.
- Zhang, Mingjin; Liu, Liqin (2007). 158 Armies in the History of the Kuomintang. Beijing: People's Liberation Army Press.
