= Jiang Dengxuan =

Chinese general and politician (1880–1925)

- 姜登选
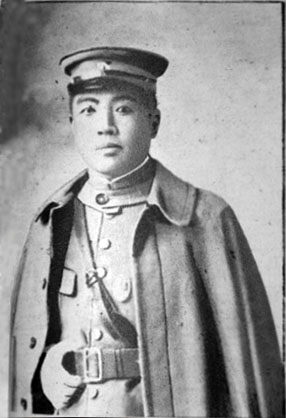
- Jiang Dengxuan, c. 1925

Personal details
- Born: 1880 or 1881 (Note: Sources disagree on his exact birth year. Powell and the Nangong City Chronicles place it at 1880, while Xu records 1881.) Nangong or Ji County, (Note: As with his birth year, his exact birthplace is disputed. Powell and the Nangong Chronicles agree that he was born there, but Lai and Xu place his birth in Ji County.) Zhili, Qing Empire
- Died: November 25, 1925 (aged 44–45)

Military service
- Allegiance: Fengtian Clique
- Years of service: 1903-1925
- Rank: Major General

Jiang Dengxuan (Simplified Chinese: 姜登选; traditional Chinese: 姜登選; pinyin: Jiāng Dēngxuǎn; Wade–Giles: Chiang Teng-sien; 1880 – 25 November 1925), courtesy name Chao Liu (Chinese: 超六; pinyin: Chāo liù) was a Chinese general and politician during the Warlord Era, most famous for his service in Zhang Zuolin's Fengtian Army.

== Early life and education ==
Jiang was born into a wealthy family of landlords and businessmen. He did well in the early stages of the imperial examination system, but China's defeat in the Boxer Rebellion motivated him to become a soldier. In 1903, he went to Japan to study military science. During this period, he was influenced by early Chinese nationalists Huang Xing and Song Jiaoren, and joined Sun Yat-sen's Tongmenghui the year it was founded. In 1908, he graduated from the Artillery Department of the Imperial Japanese Army Academy.

== Career ==
=== Zhu Qinglan's right-hand man ===
Upon returning to China, he served in a military patrol under Zhu Qinglan in Fengtian province. Zhu appreciated his talent, and took him with him when he was transferred to Sichuan. There, Jiang served as a second-class staff officer in the 33rd Mixed Combination Association of the Army and in the general office of the Sichuan Army Preparatory School. In 1911, the Sichuan Railway Protection Movement broke out on the eve of the Wuchang Uprising, and Governor Zhao Erfeng was forced to step down. Zhu was appointed deputy governor in a military government with Jiang as his chief of staff. Zhu's troops mutinied and both men left the province.

In 1912 Jiang served as an instructor at the Baoding Military Academy, and the next year was made chief of staff for the 1st Division of the Guizhou Army. In November 1913, Zhu Qinglan became Governor of Heilongjiang and once again made Jiang his chief of staff. In December, Jiang was awarded the rank of Major General. In May 1914, Yuan Shikai loyalist Xu Lanzhou used his superior military force to make Zhu resign, and Jiang followed suit. In 1916, Zhu served as the governor of Guangdong, and Jiang served as his assistant. There, Jiang helped settle the fighting between local warlords Long Jiguang and Lu Rongting. In 1917, Zhu Qinglan resigned as governor of Guangdong. Jiang Dengxuan was recalled by the Beiyang government and served as a military advisor to the presidential palace.

=== Fengtian general ===
In 1922, Jiang Dengxuan became a commander in the Fengtian Army. During the army's retreat from its defeat in the First Zhili-Fengtian War, Jiang personally went into battle and oversaw the construction of a defensive line that saved the army from further destruction. This won him praise from Zhang Zuolin and Jiang was placed in charge of reorganizing and re-equipping the army. Jiang played a major role in the rebuilding of the Fengtian Army that took place between the First and Second Zhili-Fengtian Wars.

During the Second Zhili-Fengtian War in 1924, Jiang served as the commander of the 1st Fengtian Army. Along with the Third Army under Zhang Xueliang, Jiang was tasked with taking the Shanhai Pass on the road to Beijing. Here the Fengtian forces faced Zhili's First, Second, and Third Route Armies encamped behind strong defensive lines. From when fighting began on September 29 until the end of the first week of October, Jiang and Zhang's attacks were repulsed. However, Jiang's second-in-command Han Lichun was able to break through the Jiumenkou passes to the north and the Zhili flank was turned. In the subsequent fighting for the railway near Shimenzhai, Jiang and Han led from the front. The close-quarters combat was brutal and the Zhili forces slowly began to push the Fengtian Army back on the 18th and 19 October. During the battle, Han attempted to dismiss an artillery officer serving under Guo Songling. Incensed, Guo withdrew his eight regiments from the battle lines at Jiumenkou, threatening the entire Fengtian position. It was only Zhang Xueliang's speedy intervention which soothed Guo and convinced him to return to the front before the Zhili forces could discover the opening.

After the end of the war, Jiang and Guo both agreed that the warlord armies should be disarmed in order to bring peace to China. They suggested this to the parties negotiating at the Tianjin Conference, but their proposals were not adopted.

In August 1925, Jiang was appointed as the commander of the suppression of bandits in Jiangsu and Anhui, and the supervisor of military affairs in Anhui. He was attacked by the Zhili-aligned warlord Sun Chuanfang and retreated to Shandong, where he joined forces with Zhang Zongchang. However, Sun Chuanfang defeated both of them solidly. Jiang subsequently returned to Manchuria to serve as the commander of the Fengtian 4th Front Army.

=== Death and legacy ===
On 22 November 1925, Jiang's fellow officer Guo Songling launched an anti-Zhang Zuolin mutiny. Jiang Dengxuan drove through Luanzhou Station, intending to negotiate with Guo, but was detained after entering the city. Guo Li tried to persuade Jiang to join him and oppose Zhang, but Jiang instead scolded him for insubordination. Guo ordered him executed, and he was shot on November 26 at the age of 46.

Today, the Jiang Dengxuan stele is a city-level protected cultural site in Xingtai.

== Bibliography ==
- Waldron, Arthur (1995). From War to Nationalism: China's Turning Point, 1924-1925. New York: Cambridge University Press. ISBN 0521472385.
- Powell, John Benjamin (1925). Who's who in China; containing the pictures and biographies of China's best known political, financial, business and professional men. Shanghai: The China Weekly Review.
- Liu, Shoulin (1995). Republic of China Official Chronology. Zhonghua Book Company. ISBN 9787101013207.
- Xu, Youchun (2007). The Great Dictionary of the Republic of China (Enlarged ed.). Shijiazhuang: Hebei People's Publishing House. ISBN 978-7-202-03014-1.
- Nangong City Local Chronicles Compilation Committee, ed. (1995). Nangong City Chronicles (in Chinese). Nangong, China: Hebei People's Publishing House. ISBN 7202017148.
- Lai, Xinxia (2000). The History of The Northern Warlords (in Chinese). Tianjin: Nankai University Press. ISBN 7547309615.
