= Wu Junsheng =

Chinese politician (1863–1928)

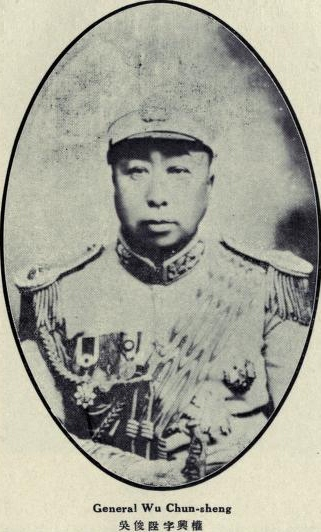
Wu Junsheng

Wu Junsheng (simplified Chinese: 吴俊陞; traditional Chinese: 吳俊陞; pinyin: Wú Jùnshēng; or Wu Tsi-cheng; 11 October 1863 – 4 June 1928) was a Chinese general and commander-in-chief of the cavalry in the Fengtian Army.

Wu Junsheng was born to a peasant family in Changtu, Fengtian province (today Liaoning), on November 23, 1863. He joined a cavalry troop in 1880 and helped crush the Manchu independence plan (supported by the Japanese) in 1912. He supported Yuan Shikai's monarchy in 1915 and Zhang Zuolin's effort to seize Manchuria. He was rewarded with the military and civil governorship of Heilongjiang in March 1921 and promoted to commander of the 5th Army in 1924. He held those posts until June 1928, when he was one of those killed in what came to be known as the Huanggutun incident, when a Japanese officer set a bomb to blow up a railroad car carrying Zhang Zuolin, who was also killed. He adopted his nephew Wu Tailai (吳泰來) as heir.

Wu Junsheng is the maternal grandfather of the fashion designer Vera Wang.
