= Zhang Zuoxiang =

Zhang Zuoxiang (simplified Chinese: 张作相; traditional Chinese: 張作相; pinyin: Zhāng Zuòxiāng; 8 March 1881 – 7 May 1949) was an important member of the Fengtian clique and general in the Fengtian Army.

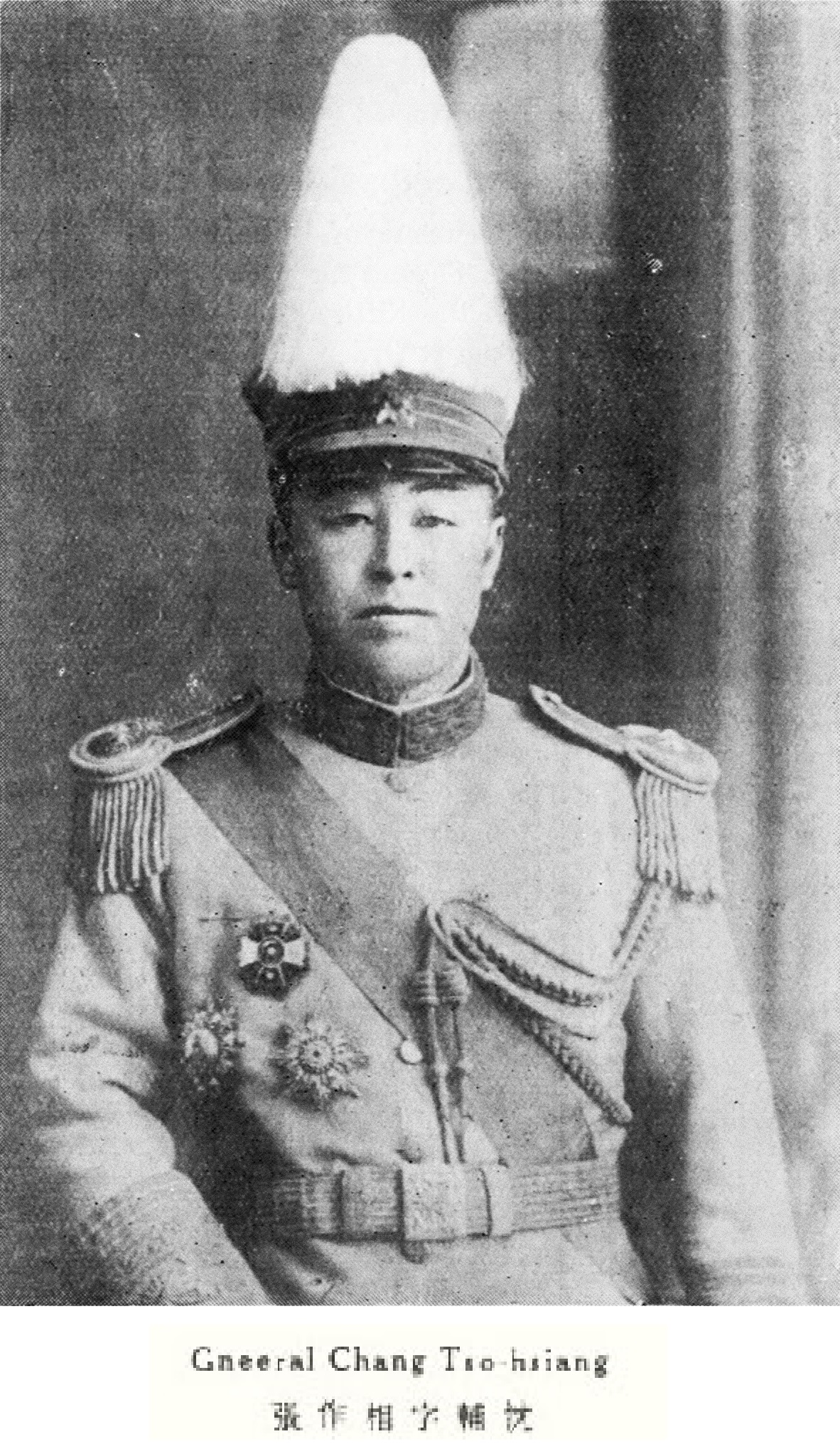

Zhang Zuoxiang was born in 1881 in Jinzhou, western Fengtian (now Liaoning), China. A loyal follower of Zhang Zuolin, he was the commander of the 27th Regiment, 27th Division, of the Fengtian Defence Force from 1911 to 1916 as Zhang Zuolin took control of Fengtian. He rose up through the ranks of the new Fengtian Army as commander of a brigade (1916–19), acting commander of 27th Division (1919, 1920) and Fengtian garrison commander (1919). From 1920 to 1922 he was staff officer for the Military Governor of Fengtian, Zhang Zuolin himself. He soon was given significant commands of the Eastern Route Army in 1922 and the 3rd Detachment, Zhenwei Army from 1922 to 1924.

In April 1924 he was rewarded with the military governorship of Jilin province, which he retained until December 1928. He also held the civil governorship of the province in the same time, except for the time between December 1924 and June 1927.

Zhang rose higher in command as General of the 4th Army, Zhenwei Army from 1924 to 1925 and of the Northeastern Provinces Railway Route Army from 1925 to 1926. By 1928 he was Deputy General Commander of the Northeastern Border Defence Command. He became the Chairman of the Jilin Provincial Government and oversaw the reorganization of the Jilin provincial Army.

In 1931, following the Japanese invasion of Manchuria, he was forced to retreat to Jinzhou, where he became commanding general of the remnants of the Fengtian forces of the Northeastern Border Defence Command. After their defeat he became a member of the Peking Branch, National Military Council, in 1933. He was commander of the Chinese 6th Army Group (2nd Northern China Army Group) during the Battle of Rehe. Following that defeat he resigned. In 1936 he was again appointed a member of the National Military Council and of the Political Board, Northeastern Field Headquarters, but was soon removed due to his links to Zhang Xueliang following the Xi'an Incident.

During the Chinese Civil War in 1947 he was recalled and made a member of the Government Affairs Board, Northeastern Field Headquarters, becoming its Deputy Head in 1948. That same year he became Deputy Commander-in-Chief of the Northeastern Bandit Suppression Headquarters, but was captured by the People's Liberation Army. He died the next year on May 7 in Tianjin.

== Awards and decorations ==
Order of Rank and Merit
Order of the Golden Grain
Order of Wen-Hu

== Sources ==
- Rulers: Chinese Administrative divisions, Jilin
- The Generals of WWII; Generals from China; Zhang Zuoxiang
- Arthur Waldron, From War to Nationalism, Cambridge University Press, 1995.
- Rana Mitter, THE MANCHURIAN MYTH: NATIONALISM, RESISTANCE, AND COLLABORATION IN MODERN CHINA, University of California Press, Berkeley, 2000
