= Guo Songling =

Chinese warlord (1883-1925)

Guo Songling 郭松龄
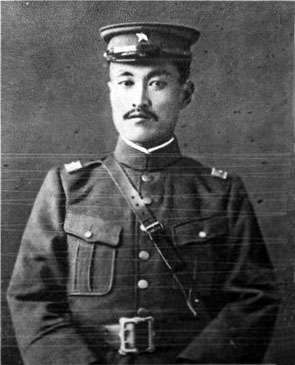
- Born: 1883; Mukden, Fengtian Province, Qing dynasty
- Died: December 25, 1925 (aged 41–42); Laodafang Village, Liaozhong County, Mukden, Fengtian Province, Republic of China
- Military career
- Allegiance: Qing Dynasty (1905–1912); Beiyang Government (1911–1925)
- Branch: Fengtian Clique
- Service years: 1905–1925
- Conflicts: First Zhili–Fengtian War; Second Zhili–Fengtian War

Guo Songling (simplified Chinese: 郭松龄; traditional Chinese: 郭松齡; pinyin: Guō Sōnglíng; Wade–Giles: Kuo Sung-ling) (1883 – 25 December 1925) was a Chinese general who served in the Fengtian Army under Zhang Zuolin during the Chinese Warlord Era. A republican sympathiser who briefly served under Sun Yat-Sen, he was a teacher of and an important influence on Zhang Zuolin's son, Zhang Xueliang. Citing desire to avoid civil war, he led a three-month rebellion against Zhang Zuolin which led to his defeat and execution.

== Youth and formative years ==
Guo Songling was born in 1883 in a village on the outskirts of Mukden, the capital of Fengtian Province, Qing China, which is modern day Shengyang, with a traditional ancestral hometown of Taiyuan in Central China.

In 1905, the Viceroy of Manchuria Zhao Erxun set up the Fengtian Primary Army School, to which 22 year old Guo Songling was admitted. On high marks, he was recommended the following year to enter the Baoding Military Academy, Northern China's premier military academy. In 1907, he graduated and joined the Qing Dynasty's Qing New Army as a sergeant in Mukden.

In 1909, general Zhu Qinglan became the guard commander, and Zhu became a close patron of Guo. When Zhu's post was rotated, Guo followed Zhu to a new post in Sichuan province. In divisions overseen by Zhu, the revolutionary secret society Chinese Revolutionary League (Tongmenghui), was active and was tolerated. Guo Songling joined the Tongmenghui in 1910.

== Military career ==
In 1911, during the Railway Protection Movement, the Sichuan Tongmenghui erupted in protest against the Qing government, encircling Chengdu. Guo Songling however did not participate in this uprising and, now the battalion commander for Northern Chengdu, was able to diplomatically put it down without bloodshed. Suspected of republican sympathies, Guo Songling was relieved of his command by Sichuan Governor-General Zhao Erfeng, only recovering it after the appeals of his patron Zhu Qinglan. Late in the same year, the Xinhai Revolution broke out and spread to Sichuan. Sichuan declared independence and in Chengdu formed the "Chinese Military Government of Sichuan". During this period out-of-province officers like Zhu Qinglan were pushed out of the military government in favor of local Sichuanese officers. With his patron removed, Guo Songling resigned decided to return to Manchuria.

=== Constitution Protection Movement ===
In July 1917, Sun Yat-Sen declared the Constitutional Protection Movement in opposition to the Beiyang clique warlords that had taken over the national government, establishing a military government in Guangzhou. Guo's patron Zhu Qinglan allied himself with Sun and took up a post as governor of Guangdong Province under Sun, and Guo Songlian followed his mentor to Guangdong. During this period Guo served on the staff of the Guangdong, Guangxi, and Hunan Border Supervision Offices, and the head of the Guangdong Military Battalion. As a young officer, he gained the praise of Sun Yat-Sen. In May 1918, Sun Yat-Sen dissolved the Guangzhou military government under pressure from warlords, and Guo Songlian returned to Fengtian.

=== Fengtian Clique General ===
In 1919, Zhang Zuolin formed the Manchurian Army Military Academy 东三省陆军讲武堂, and Guo Songling was appointed as instructor in military tactics. One of his students was Zhang Zuolin's son Zhang Xueliang, who held Guo's capability in deep esteem. In 1920, Zhang Xueliang graduated from the Military Academy and was appointed a brigade commander in the Fengtian Army, and upon Zhang Xueliang's recommendation Guo was appointed to be the younger Zhang's chief of staff. Zhang, the "Old Marshal" was an illiterate bandit, a self-proclaimed graduate of "the University of the Forest" (i.e. the bandit lifestyle) turned soldier. Zhang had started his military career in 1904 during the Russian-Japanese War when he and his bandits were hired by the Japanese to ambush Russian supply columns and thereafter Zhang continued to work for the Japanese. Zhang had no beliefs beyond a desire for a power and once hired a Confucian scholar to give his movement a sham-ideology to justify his actions. However, the way that Zhang openly worked to serve Japanese interests in China made many of his subordinates uncomfortable including his son Zhang Xueling, known as the "Young Marshal" to distinguish him from his father.

As chief of staff, Guo trained the younger Zhang's brigade into one of the best brigades in the Fengtian army. In July of that year, the Zhili–Anhui War erupted, and Guo was appointed by Zhang Zuolin as commander of an allied force with the Zhili clique against the Anhui clique. Guo's forces decisively beat the Anhui forces in Tianjin, and he grew more and more in Zhang Zuolin's confidence.

In 1921, Zhang Zuolin expanded the Fengtian army into ten mixed brigades, with the third directed by Zhang Xueliang and the eighth directed by Guo Songling. The third and eighth brigades formed a united command, and Guo Songling took charge of operations and training for both divisions. In May 1922, the First Zhili–Fengtian War broke out, and the Fengtian clique suffered heavy losses, but the elite third and eighth brigades were able to retreat without much casualties. Afterwards Zhang Zuolin established the Army Organizational Department 陆军整理处, with Zhang Xueliang as Chief-of-Staff and Guo Songling as Acting Chief of staff, in charge of military organization, order and training.

== Dissatisfaction with Zhang Zuolin and rebellion ==
During the Second Zhili–Fengtian War a personal grievance over a friend's removal from command caused him to retreat and nearly cost his army the war. A sense that he was being under-appreciated, along with gradual encouragement by Guominjun rival Feng Yuxiang to help put Zhang's more liberal son on the Manchurian throne, led to his mutiny in mid-1925. Guo's wife, Han Shuxiu was a close friend of Li Dequan who was General Feng's wife. Both Han and Li had attended the same Methodist Women's College in Beijing. Li was reported to have "stirred up" Han who in turn demanded that her husband overthrow the "Old Marshal" Zhang.

Marching his division north towards Zhang's headquarters at Shenyang on 22 November, Guo met success in the early weeks of the offensive. However, when the city's Japanese garrison interfered in defence of Zhang and neither the expected popular support or assistance of the Guominjun appeared, his rebellion stalled. Guo had been regarded as Zhang's most capable general and most of his officers followed him in his rebellion. Once the rebellion stalled, his officers abandoned him and returned their loyalty to Zhang. Within the month his forces were surrounded by the Fengtian Army and annihilated. Guo and his wife were captured on 24 December 1925 and executed the next day on 25 December. The British journalist Bertram Lenox Simpson used the rebellion as an example of why Chinese women should not get a Western education, writing in an article "in the end the foreign educated wives got their way with the tragic reasons known". The bodies of Guo and Han were left on public display for three days as a warning to those who would betray Zhang.

== Sources ==
- Dupuy, Trevor N. Harper Encyclopedia of Military Biography, New York, 1992.
- Fenby, Jonathan (2003). The Generalissimo Chiang Kai-shek and the China He Lost. New York: Free Press. ISBN 9780743231442.
- Merkel-Hess, Kate (2024). Women and Their Warlords Domesticating Militarism in Modern China. Chicago: University of Chicago Press. ISBN 9780226834313.
