= Nanjing decade =

Period in the history of the Republic of China from 1927 to 1937

Nanjing Decade
- 1927–1937
Warlord Era	Second Sino–Japanese War
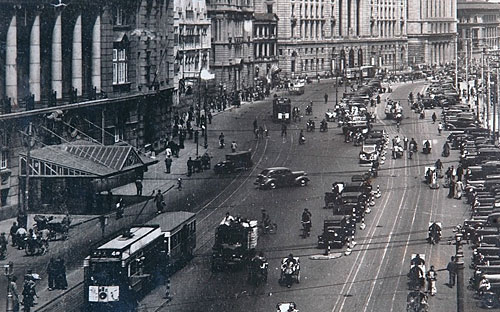
- The Bund in Shanghai in the 1930s
- Location: Republic of China
- Key events: Chinese Civil War; Central Plains War; Japanese invasion of Manchuria

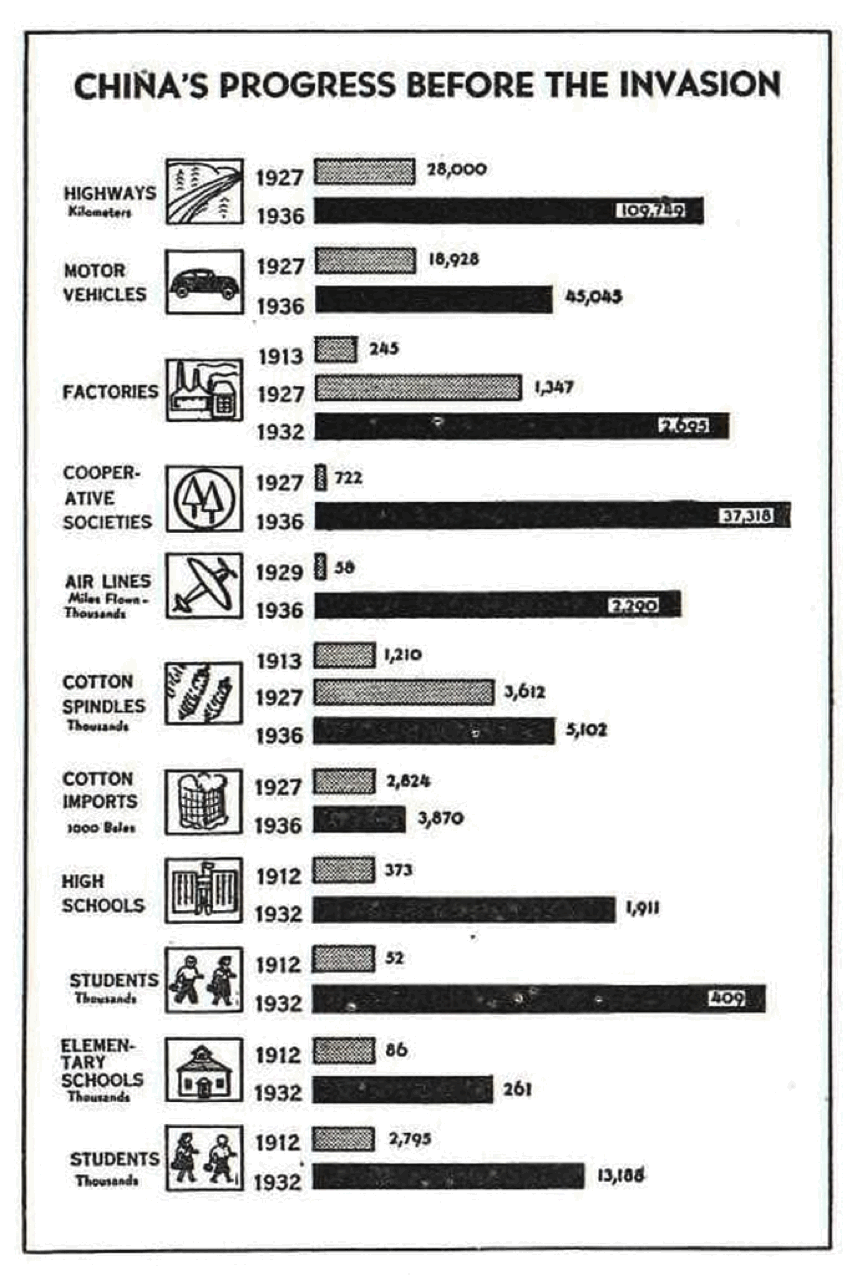
Chart of Chinese progress from a US wartime pamphlet

The Nanjing Decade (also Nanking Decade, Chinese: 南京十年; pinyin: Nánjīng shí nián, or the Golden Decade, Chinese: 黃金十年; pinyin: Huángjīn shí nián) is an informal name for the decade from 1927 to 1937 in the Republic of China. It began when Nationalist Generalissimo Chiang Kai-shek took Nanjing from Zhili clique warlord Sun Chuanfang halfway through the Northern Expedition on April 18, 1927. Chiang declared it to be the national capital despite the existence of a left-wing Nationalist government in Wuhan. The Wuhan faction gave in and the Northern Expedition continued until the Beiyang government in Beijing was overthrown in 1928. The decade ended with the outbreak of the Second Sino-Japanese War in 1937 and the retreat of the Nationalist government to Wuhan. GDP growth averaged 3.9 percent a year from 1929 to 1941 and per capita GDP about 1.8 percent. Historians view the decade as a period of Chinese conservatism.

Nanjing was of symbolic and strategic importance. The Ming dynasty had made Nanjing a capital, the republic had been established there in 1912, and Sun Yat-sen's provisional government had been there. Sun's body was brought and placed in a grand mausoleum to cement Chiang's legitimacy. Chiang was born in nearby Zhejiang and the general area had strong popular support for him.

The Nanjing decade was marked by both progress and frustration. The period was far more stable than the preceding Warlord Era. There was enough stability to allow economic growth and the start of ambitious government projects, some of which were taken up again by the new government of the People's Republic after 1949. Nationalist foreign service officers negotiated diplomatic recognition from Western governments and began to unravel the unequal treaties. Entrepreneurs, educators, lawyers, doctors, and other professionals were more free to create modern institutions than at any earlier time. However, the Nationalist government also suppressed dissent, corruption and nepotism were rampant and revolts broke out in several provinces; internal conflicts also perpetuated within the government. The Nationalists were never able to fully pacify the Chinese Communist Party, and struggled to address the widespread unrest and protests over their failure to check Japanese aggression.

== The party-state ==
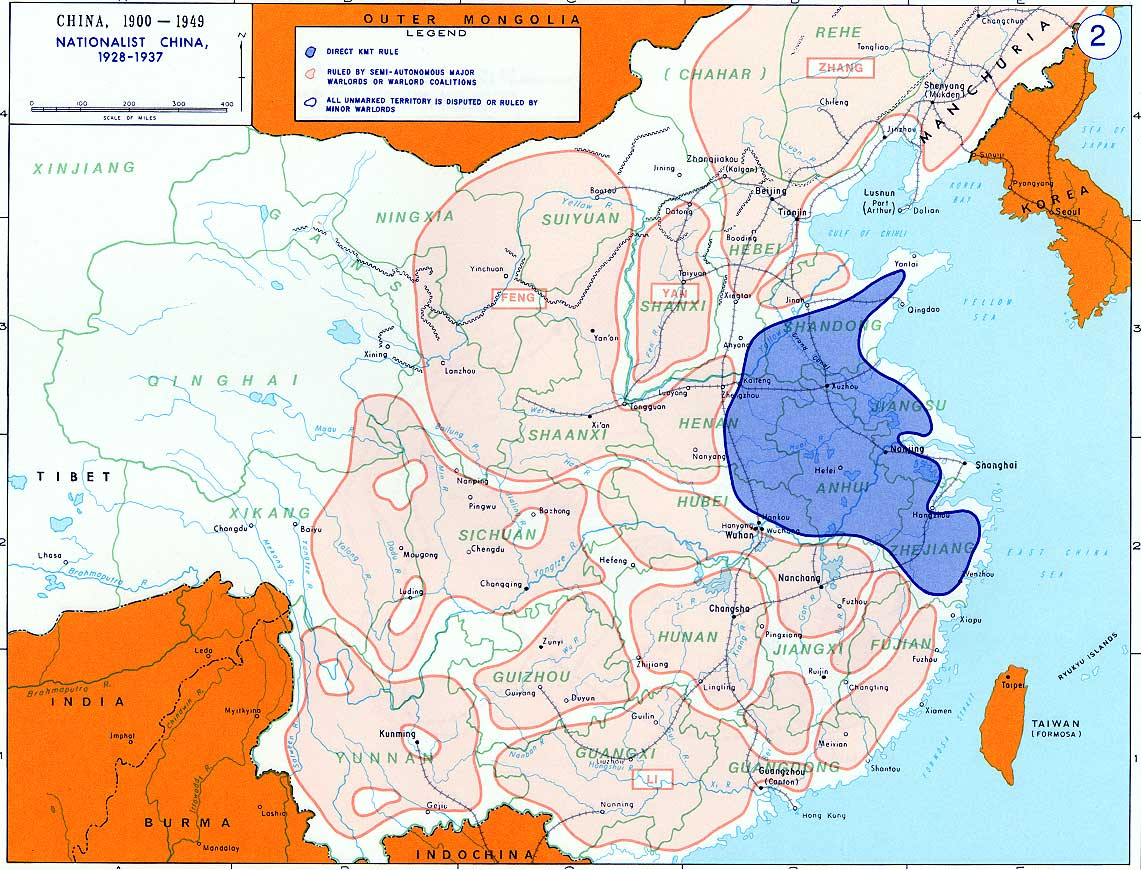
Zones of control during the "Nanjing Decade"

The organization and function of the KMT one-party state was derived from Sun's "Three Stages of Revolution" and his policy of Dang Guo. The first stage was military unification, which was carried out with the Northern Expedition. The second was "political tutelage" which was a provisional government led by the KMT to educate people about their political and civil rights, and the third stage was constitutional government. The KMT considered themselves to be at the second stage in 1928.

The KMT set up its five-branch government (based on the Three Principles of the People) using an organic law including Executive Yuan, Legislative Yuan, Judicial Yuan, Control Yuan and Examination Yuan. This government disavowed continuity with the defunct Beiyang government that enjoyed international recognition; however the state was still the same – the Republic of China. Nevertheless, many bureaucrats from the Beiyang government flooded into Nanjing to receive jobs.

Chiang was elected President of the National Government by the KMT central executive committee in October 1928. In the absence of a National Assembly, the KMT's party congress functioned in its place. Since party membership was a requirement for civil service positions, the KMT was full of careerists and opportunists.

The KMT was heavily factionalized into pro- and anti-Chiang groups. The largest faction in the party following reunification was the pro-Chiang Whampoa clique (a.k.a. the National Revolutionary Army First Army Group/Central Army), which made up slightly over half of the party membership. A Whampoa sub-faction was the infamous Blue Shirts Society. Next was the CC Clique, a pro-Chiang civilian group. A third group, the technocratic Political Study Clique, was more liberal than the other two pro-Chiang factions. They were formed by KMT members of the first National Assembly back in 1916. These three factions competed with each other for Chiang's favor.

Opposition to Chiang came from both the left and the right. The leftist opposition was led by Wang Jingwei and known as the Reorganizationists. The rightist opposition was led by Hu Hanmin. Hu never created or joined a faction but he was viewed as the spiritual leader by the Western Hills Group, led by Lin Sen. There were also individuals within the party who were not part of any faction, like Sun Fo. These anti-Chiang figures were outnumbered in the party but held great power by their seniority, unlike many pro-Chiang cadres that joined only during or after the Northern Expedition. Chiang cleverly played these factions off against one another. The party itself was reduced to a mere propaganda machine, while real power lay with Chiang and the National Revolutionary Army (NRA).

== Intra-party struggles ==
In 1922, the KMT had formed the First United Front with the Communists to defeat the warlords and reunify China. In April 1927, however, Chiang split with the Communists and purged them from the Front against the wishes of the KMT leadership in Wuhan, setting up a rival KMT government in Nanjing. The split and the purge was detrimental to the KMT's Northern Expedition and allowed the Zhili-Fengtian coalition to launch a successful counterattack. The mostly leftist Wuhan faction soon purged the Communists as well and reunited with Chiang in Nanjing. The Northern Expedition restarted in February 1928 and successfully reunited China by the end of the year.

At the end of the Expedition, the NRA consisted of four army groups: Chiang's Whampoa clique, Feng Yuxiang's Guominjun, Yan Xishan's Shanxi clique, and Li Zongren's New Guangxi clique. Chiang did not have direct control of the other three so he considered them to be threats.

In February 1929, Li Zongren fired the pro-Chiang governor of Hunan but Chiang objected and the two clashed in March, leading to Li's defeat and (temporary) expulsion from the KMT by the third party congress. Feng Yuxiang rebelled on May 19 but was humiliated when half of his army defected through bribery. From October to February, fighting resumed with Wang Jingwei and Lin Sen joining the opposition. In May 1930, the Central Plains War erupted, pitting Chiang against the Beiping faction of Yan Xishan, Feng Yuxiang, Li Zongren, and Wang Jingwei. Though victorious, the conflict left Chiang's government bankrupt.

In 1931, Hu Hanmin attempted to block Chiang's provisional constitution and was put under house arrest. This caused another uprising by Chen Jitang, Li Zongren, Sun Fo and other anti-Chiang factions who converged on Guangzhou to set up a rival government. War was averted due to the Japanese invasion of Manchuria but it did cause Chiang to release Hu and resign as president and premier. Chiang's influence was restored when he was made chairman of the Military Affairs Commission at the start of the Battle of Shanghai (1932). Hu moved to Guangzhou and led an autonomous government in Liangguang.

In November 1933, the Fujian Rebellion erupted by dissident KMT elements. The rebellion was crushed in January.

During Chiang's second premiership, Hu Hanmin died on 12 May 1936 and left a power vacuum in the south. Chiang wanted to fill it with a loyalist that would end the south's autonomy. Chen Jitang and Li Zongren conspired to overthrow Chiang but were politically outmaneuvered by bribes and defections. Chen resigned and the plot fizzled. In December, Chiang was kidnapped by Zhang Xueliang and forced to ally with the Communists in the Second United Front to combat the Japanese occupation.

In addition, the Ma clique and the Xinjiang clique, both KMT affiliates, were contesting each other in the western fringes from 1931 until 1937 in the Xinjiang Wars when the Soviet Union's support helped the Xinjiang group to triumph. Xinjiang then became a Soviet protectorate and safe haven for Communists. The Ma clique also fought Sun Dianying in 1934.

Wang Jingwei's collaborationist government during the Second Sino-Japanese War can be seen as an extension of these party power struggles.

These civil wars extended Chiang's direct rule from four provinces to eleven just prior to the Marco Polo Bridge Incident.

== Suppression of Communists and other parties ==
The Chinese Civil War which began with the purge of communists in 1927 would continue until the forming of the Second United Front in December 1936. During this period, the Nationalists tried destroying the Communists by using Encirclement Campaigns. The failure of early Communist strategy of urban warfare led to the rise of Mao Zedong who advocated guerrilla warfare. The Communists were much weaker in the urban areas due to secret police repression led by Dai Li. Many Communists and suspected or actual Communist sympathizers were imprisoned, including the wife and four year old daughter of Marshal Nie.

Other parties that were heavily persecuted were the Young China Party and the "Third Party". They would remain banned until the Second Sino-Japanese War when they were allowed into the Second United Front as part of the China Democratic League.

== Warlord conflicts during the Nanjing decade ==
- Warlord Rebellion in northeastern Shandong
  - Beijing Revolt
- Central Plains War
- Han–Liu War
- Two-Liu War
- War in Ningxia (1934)

== Conflicts with Japan and Soviet Union ==
- Sino-Soviet conflict (1929)
- Soviet Invasion of Xinjiang
- Xinjiang War (1937)
- Nanking incident of 1927
- Jinan incident

== Military developments ==
Following the Central Plains war Chiang was unable to re-assert his full control over the country as Hu Hanmin prevented him from using the legislative Yuan and Wang Jingwei from using the Executive Yuan. Thus Chiang turned to Field Headquarters a military body subordinate to the Military Affairs Commission which he headed thus Chiang based his power around the military and used it to force his agenda through government. These headquarters consisted of the Yu E Wan (Henan, Hubei and Anhui), Yu Shan Jin (Henan, Shaanxi and Shanxi) Beiping (Rehe, Chahar, Suiyuan and Hebei) the largest and most important of these was the Nanchang HQ which controlled areas of Jiangxi, Guangdong, Hunan, Fujian and Hubei.

=== Baojia system ===
The Baojia system, a dynastic Chinese institution of community-based conscription, was slated to become the basis of a new conscript system for the Chinese military. He Yingqin proposed the implementation of the system in a 1928 report, in which he argued for the system's ability to produce large amounts of disciplined soldiers at a low cost. He also argued that the system would rekindle militarism in China and weaken banditry. He dismissed the poverty and lack of education in Guangxi, Yunnan, and Guizhou, where the Baojia system was prevalent.

The Baojia system (and universal conscription in general) was rejected due to its infeasibility given China's limited finances and vast population. Instead, troops were to be organized into 6 categories (similar to Japan's system), with an active class serving for 2 years, 2 classes of trained reserves serving for 5 and 10 years respectively, and 2 classes of supplementary troops in territorial formations. All surplus men were to be given ad-hoc training when possible, and 50 divisions were to be raised via this method. The KMT was, thereafter, committed to this system of conscription and training.

By 1932, however, Chiang had ordered the implementation of the Baojia system, with all officials (down to the county level) told to organize the training of Baojia troops. Local and regional leaders were given the highest priority and were punished for failure. Chiang ordered the program to be completed in 1934, with 3,000,000 peasants to be enrolled in 3 months in Henan alone. Yang Yongtai led the Yu E Wan Field Headquarters (the primary organizer of the Baojia system). Initially, Baojia units served as local militias, their main roles being akin to the emergency/civil services of other countries. These roles included anti-bandit action, irrigation work, flood control, road building, construction of military positions, etc.

The Baojia system also registered millions of Chinese men and their families, allowing for statistics to be recorded comprehensively. By spring 1933, the high goals of the Baojia system had been met in over 80 counties in Anhui by spring 1933, with similar progress in Hubei and Henan.

By 1936, the Baojia system was linked to the army system, with 50,000 conscripts in 12 divisions called up via the Baojia into the regular army. By early 1937, this rose to 20 Baojia divisions, with 40 more to be raised as per the 60 division plan.

=== Militia ===
The Militia of modern China an invention of Zeng Guofan and his proteges were to become co-opted by the Nationalist Government in order to use them for anti-communist policies and to intensify central government power in local areas. In 1928, the provincial level position of Superintendent of Rural pacification (Qingxiang duban) was founded with Rural Pacification Commanders (Qingxiang Siling) controlling them later renamed to Peace preservation commanders (bao'an siling). The Governor of a province held this post ex officio but with most military and executive actions emanating under this office it quickly became an office equivalent in power to the Governorship. The office was primarily tasked with the suppression of communist revolutionaries and partisans and thus it controlled all the provincial militias.

This office was built on the backs of earlier efforts during the Northern Expedition to organise anti-communist militias to control the growth of CCP power in rural areas. These early forms of militias were organised at village, township and town levels with no coordination and with strong local ties which hindered militia efficiency the formation of a provincial office was intended to remedy this and to also prevent the local gentry and "bullies" from using the militia for their own personal gain.

The reforms instituted by Hunan were applied in a similar fashion across the Lower Yangtze region as well as Hubei and Jiangxi. The institution and proliferation of the militia (peace preservation and Baojia) saw banditry almost eliminated in the provinces where they were established with the remaining bandits fleeing to the mountains or the coastal islands, the Hunan peace forces being used as regular troops temporarily is a testament to the strength of these forces.

Status of Peace Preservation forces 1934
Figures	Jiangsu	Zhejiang	Henan	Hubei	Hunan	Anhui	Jiangxi	Fujian	Shaanxi	Total
Men at arms	7,810	N/A	54,686	34,773	33,824	24,233	39,847	29,859	16,542	241,571
handguns	5,748	21,937	22,597	28,682	21,096	20,822	34,383	12,512	16,243	183,450
Mortars	32	52	32	N/A	N/A	N/A	8	42	N/A	166
Machine guns	70	375	73	N/A	30	N/A	103	42	N/A	518
Expenditure monthly (yuan) {annual}	480,000	510,000	603,428	400,000	460,000	314,709	470,594	482,592	140,240	3,378,971{40,547,652}

==== Militia in Hunan ====
===== Initial reforms =====
In Hunan in 1928 a set of regulations was issued by He Jian the governor (and therefore Superintendent) to re-organise the provincial militias and bring them under control of the Central Government. Each county was ordered to organise militia under the term household conscription militia (aihutuan) as well as a general bureau headed by the magistrate to control the County militia's funding, armament, recruitment and deployment of the militia theoretically centralising the militia with a deputy being nominated by the magistrate by recommendations sent from county organisations. The militiamen were divided into 2 categories the first consisted of one out of every 3rd man between the ages of 18 and 40 into the unpaid role of watch patrol (shouwangdui) armed with various melee weapons and shotguns led and organised by the Baojia. The 2nd category was the best men of the watch patrol which were organised into 90 man standing companies (changbeidui) where they served for 3 years with a salary and were given standardised armament each county had to form 5–20 such companies depending on resources and necessity.

However, this first organisation did not go well as the magistrate had many other functions and therefore could not properly attend to the militia meaning the deputy often a local elite member still controlled the militia undermining the purpose of the regulations which was to centralise militia. Secondly, the watch patrols also intended to be used for disemminating KMT doctrine and propganada failed as the localities failed to properly introduce the necessary training and they often lacked the resources regardless thus it was introduced in a desultory manner if it at all. This then undermines the standing companies who were to be recruited from watch patrols and instead regular troops and mercenaries were labelled as watch patrols undermining the efforts to link to a broad popular base there was also a lack of experienced and trained personnel to command these forces lastly, the division of forces into small groups hindered their ability to fight communist groups of a large size or even bandits and they would be reluctant to leave their immediate community not to mention aiding other counties.

===== Further reforms =====
In 1930 a new regulation was issued expanding the aihutuan to all able-bodied law-abiding men aged 18–40 with the explicit purpose to militarise the entire province He Jian rejected arming the entire Aihutuan with guns if at all instead focusing on their ability to organise anti-communism giving it a more political purpose than originally intended. He Jian also ordered inspections to assure proper implementation of these regulations province wide the success of these formations was reported in the media as the aihutuan joined the army in anti-communist campaigns. Following a 4 Province conference on militia He Jian authorised further formations ordering each county to consolidate its Changbeidui companies into a singular Peace Preservation battalion or regiment depending on the pre-existing strength. The usage of military terminology was because He Jian intended for these Peace Preservation formations to become auxiliaries for the military and he introduced regulations which brought pay, pensions and recruitment into line with military standards, military officers were to command at higher levels with lower officers given military training and occasionally being rotated into the army itself for short periods in order to gain experience. A further major change was the consolidation of command under the Superintendent (He Jian) bypassing the counties and He then appointed his men into the militia command positions seizing command from the local elites this was furthered by dividing the province into special districts headed by district commanders appointed by He this combined with the usage of militia across multiple districts different areas of the province and by basing them in different regions combined to eliminate county ties completely. In 1933 He had established 29 Peace preservation Regiments for the entirety of Hunan with numerical rather than geographical designations.

=== Education ===
Following the Jinan incident public pressure particularly from the student body itself led to the introduction of military training at all Chinese schools with instructors dispatched from the Central government to oversee the implementation of military training with it first implemented in the Lower Yangtze region then spreading to other areas under Nationalist control then the whole country. By 1935 491 Secondary schools and 33,654 secondary students were participating with more schools and students participating in the Lower Yangtze region. All male students under the regulations would have to attend 3 hours of training a week and 1 3 week intensive session in the summer for the first 2 years of high school. Female students received first-aid and other medical training. The instruction was 2 hours a week practical and 1 theoretical. Training was akin to a less intensive military academy course with topics such as combat, fortifications, signalling and communications, marksmanship, drill, armament manufacture and international military trends. In 1935 collective military training was organised in Jiangsu, Zhejiang, Shanghai and Nanjing with 3 month courses providing NCO training with it being mandatory for all first year male students with some "spiritual training" in loyalty to the state and the KMT being introduced.

== Reforms ==
China's first government sponsored social engineering program began in 1934 with the New Life Movement. In addition, non-governmental reforms, such as the Rural Reconstruction Movement made substantial progress in addressing the problems of the countryside. Many social activists who participated in this movement were graduated as professors of the United States. They made tangible but limited progress in modernizing the tax, infrastructural, economic, cultural, and educational equipment and mechanisms of rural regions until the cancellation of government coordination and subsidies in the mid-to-late 1930s due to rampant wars and the lack of resources. The rural reconstructive activists advocated a "third way" between the communist violent land reform and the reformism of the Nationalist Government based on the respect of human rights and individual liberties for educational doctrine.

In terms of foreign policy, the Nationalist government announced its intention to end unequal treaties and extraterritoriality in 1929, It achieved its first success that same year when several countries agreed to revise their extraterritorial privileges in China, while the agreements with the United Kingdom and the United States came into effect in 1943, marking the formal end of extraterritoriality in China.

Economic improvements and social reforms were mixed. The Kuomintang supported women's rights and education, the abolition of polygamy, and foot binding. The government of the Republic of China under Chiang's leadership also enacted a women's quota in the parliament with reserved seats for women. During the Nanjing Decade, average Chinese citizens received the education they'd never had the chance to get in the dynasties that increased the literacy rate across China. The education also promotes the ideals of Tridemism of democracy, republicanism, science, constitutionalism, and Chinese Nationalism (Note: Particularly in the form of Republic of China nationalism.) based on the Political Tutelage of the Kuomintang. However, Periodic famines continued under Nationalist rule: in Northern China from 1928 to 1930, in Sichuan from 1936 to 1937, among others. GDP growth averaged 3.9 percent a year from 1929 to 1941 and per capita GDP about 1.8 percent. Among other institutions, the Nationalist Government founded the Academia Sinica and the Central Bank of China. In 1932, China sent a team for the first time to the Olympic Games which consisted of a single athlete, Liu Changchun. The Chinese decision was motivated primarily out of the fact that Japan wanted to send athletes from Manchukuo, a Japanese puppet state. They would later send a larger team to the 1936 Olympic Games.

=== Postal system ===
The Chinese Post Office expanded dramatically during the period with over 12,000 offices in existence, the post office also acted as a currency exchange and handler of money particularly with remittances across the urban-rural divide the Office also worked across political boundaries giving it the status of one of the few truly national bodies. The office even offered services beyond these offering insurance policies, saving accounts and gift certificates. These bank-like activities allowed for migration to occur as urban workers had a trusted institution from which they could support their families in rural areas contributing greatly to the modernisation of the economy in the interior as well as the coastal regions.

=== Education ===
The new Ministry of education amalgamated and reorganised the education system creating 13 national universities, 5 technical colleges, 9 provincial universities to provide higher education nationwide and help create an educated populace. Additionally, private higher educational institutionals received state subsidies of the 53 private colleges and universities 40 received subsidies in 1936. Secondary education saw even more marked development with the number of schools increasing in number by over 400% with 2,042 middle schools, 1,211 normal schools and 370 professional schools the total enrollment of these schools was 545,207.

== Economic developments ==
=== Fiscal measures ===
The Nationalist Government had achieved nominal unification and sought to consolidate control over China's revenue. Tariff restrictions imposed on China by foreign powers were largely lifted by 1930, and the rise in import duties increased revenue to the central government. The collection of tariffs was also changed from silver to gold; this was due to the falling price of silver following the Great Depression. The salt tax which previously was seized by local and provincial officials was brought back into Nationalist control. The provinces still collected them, but the Nationalist government retained a larger share of the revenue. The Likin, a tax targeting internal trade that was often abused, was mostly abolished. However, the national revenue came mainly from the modern sectors of the economy, and the collection of taxes from agriculture was not controlled by Nanjing given that agriculture comprised a large section of the economy. This severely limited the ability of the Nationalist government to raise revenue effectively, leading to large amounts of borrowing and the issuing of bonds to pay for its expenditures. The land tax remained in the hands of the provinces who did not reform or improve its collection. The surrender of the land tax to the provinces in 1928 surrendered some 65% of the GDP to the authority of the provinces to collect taxes from this was made for political reasons mainly to achieve national unity by allowing the provinces to maintain a source of income.

Government debt grew by a considerable amount during this period due to the rising military expenditures as Chiang sought to modernise the Chinese military. The Nanjing government floated over 1.6 Billion Yuan worth of bonds on the Chinese market led to a total bond debt of 2 billion Yuan by 1936. The Shanghai and wider Chinese bond market worked well with the Nationalist government providing significant cash flow to the government.

=== Infrastructure development ===
The Nationalist Government invested heavily in road construction for military purposes. It built 82,000 kilometers of roads during the Nanjing decade for a total of 115,000 kilometres. The old city walls and shantytowns of many cities were demolished to facilitate roadbuilding. Additionally, during the period the Nationalist government imported 500,000,000 Yuan worth of industrial machinery though this figure is not impressive in comparison to the USSR's industrial development for the more impoverished, factional, agrarian and politically divided China of the period it is a considerable amount, the majority of this industrial machinery was dedicated to textiles, foodstuffs, cement and chemicals all important to a growing nascent industry. The telegraph system abandoned and neglected by the warlords not only recovered but also expanded to over 95,000 kilometres additionally, telephone line length increased 12 fold from 4,000 to 52,500 kilometres, the recovery of basic infrastructure facilitating modern communication was an important part of the development of infrastructure.

Receipts and Expenditure of the Nanjing Government (millions of Yuan)
Sector	1928–29	1933–34	1936–37
Receipts*	434	836	1168
Customs Duty	179	352	379
Salt Duty	30	177	197
Commodity taxes	33	118	173
Other**	92	42	121
Borrowing	100	147	298
Expenditures*	434	836	1168
Party	4	6	7
Civil*	28	160	160
Military	210	373	521
Loan and indemnity servicing	160	244	302
Other	32	53	178

*the cost of collecting taxes is deducted for all years excluding 1928–29

** mostly consisting of stamp tax, provincial remittances, government business profits and miscellaneous sources

Value of China's foreign trade Million(s) USD
Year	Imports	Exports
1910	649	503
1920	997	614
1929	1,620	1,070
1930	1,723	944
1931	2,002	915
1932	1,524	569
1933	1,345	612
1934	1,030	535
1935	919	576
1936	941	706

=== Agriculture ===
The Field Headquarters acting as the enactors of Chiang's will also ventured into economic development particularly in the countryside. The Co-operatives encouraged by the national government were a major source of development in rural areas, they provided loans, seed, fertiliser and tools as well as establishing irrigation works, workshops and coordinating tree planting to control flooding and rejuvenate soil. The rural financial assistance bureaus also provided capital to the countryside and cooperatives. However, these programs were not national nor were they universal in the areas they were implemented, nonetheless progress was made mostly in the lower and central Yangtze regions which were the areas most under Chiang's control and recipients of his attention and resources. A total of 6,223 cooperatives were formed by mid-1935 with over 710,000 members. In Jiangxi where the largest effort was made due to the presence of Communist forces over 3,400,000 Yuan was spent in aid or given as loans with further resources represented with 2,500 ploughs thousands of field tools and 180,000 kilograms of rice seed.

Granaries were also established to store up to 3 months of food and by 1935 in the Nanchang HQ area 228,000 tons of grain was stored.

=== Industry ===
During the Nanjing decade, light industry was overwhelmingly privately owned.

=== Media ===
Radio's popularity grew during the Nanjing decade as radio prices dropped and the quality of broadcasting improved. Practices of radio listening in China were primarily communal, with shops in urban areas installing radios and loud speakers and eventually spread to smaller cities where families pooled funds to buy radios and place them at temples or schools.

== Warlord activities ==
=== Guangdong ===
Chen Jitang, the governor of Guangdong prioritised as typical of warlords his own provincial development above all else, though he did collaborate with Nanjing when politically expedient, he nonetheless remained devoted to his province. To these ends, Guangdong began a major highway construction programme under his rule, increasing from 3,661 km in 1929 to 17,587 by 1935, the highest in China by province. Another was the usage of his military to suppress banditry which was assisted by the large road network facilitating the movement of troops throughout the province.

Chen, having secured his position in the province saw military development as his priority expanding his army from 50,000 in June 1931 to over 150,000 by July 1932:

First Group Army
Commander/ formation	First Army	Second Army	Third Army	Independent forces
Commander	Yu Hanmou	Xiang hanping	Li yangjing	
Chief-of-Staff	Yang Gang	Ye Minyu	Zhou Zhi	
Political Department Director	Li Xunhuan	Li Heling	Di Junqian	
1st Division	Li Zhenqiu	Zhang Meixin	Huang Tingzhen	Huang Renhuan
2nd Division	Ye Zhao	Zhang Da	Huang Zhiwe	Zhang Ruigui
Training Division				Mou Peinan
Guards Brigade				Chen Hanguang
1st Brigade				Fan Dexing
2nd Brigade				Chen Zhang
3rd Brigade				Yan Yingyu
1st-8th regiment				

To equip his much larger army, Chen renovated the Shijing Arsenal from 1933 to 1935 to the extent that it employed 2,000 workers and had an annual cost of 2,400,000 Yuan. The arsenal producing monthly 12,000 rifles, 2,100,000 cartridges, 6-18 mortars, 6-18 machine guns, 1,200 shells and 20,000 grenades. However, even this was deemed insufficient in terms of artillery production and gas masks and 11,000,000 additional yuan was spent on building further arsenals to remedy this, though these projects were not completed by the time the Liangguang incident broke out and Chen was removed from power. Chen additionally purchased 12 tanks, 15 armoured cars in 1932 and from 1933 to 1936, 29 fighters, 10 reconnaissance planes, 6 monoplanes, 6 bombers, 3 trainers and a transport plane to bolster his airforce. This purchase of material was accompanied by a 300,000 yuan aircraft plant in Shaoguan.

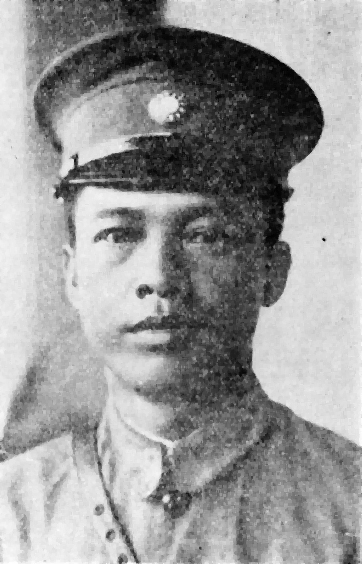
Chen Jitang the Governor of Guandong until his removal in 1936

Provincial revenue and expeniture of Guangdong
Tax name	1930-31	1932-33	1934-35
Revenue			
Provincial treasury:			
All tax receipts	28,858,817	31,731,193	52,181,711
Non-tax receipts	20,537,010	17,226,681	22,045,527
Total	49,395,827	48,957,874	74,227,238
Expenditure			
Provincial treasury:			
Regular expenses	16,988,095	15,401,788	30,143,869
Total expenses	65,666,101	63,969,102	72,432,654
Balance of Provincial treasury	-16,270,274	-14,993,228	+1,794,584

As the table indicates, the province of Guangdong ran consistent budget deficits and its overspending meant that the money allocated to the national treasury and therefore for Nanjing were never forwarded to the central government, though military expenses of a province were allocated to the national treasury and not the provincial treasury, unless there was a deficit where the provincial treasury would account for the shortfall.

National treasury revenue and expenditure of Guangdong
Revenue and expenditures	1930-31	1932-33	1934-35
Salt tax	8,325,137	7,054,409	5,004,271
Tobacco/wine tax	4,103,348	4,635,919	5,029,683
Stamp tax	1,692,228	1,731,235	1,998,822
Customs	632,690	37,258	63,098
Consolidated tax*	1,275,677	10,176,848	15,257,598
Opium Suppression	5,994,699	8,699,971	11,271,292
Others	7,911,580	188,780	283,306
Non-tax receipts	1,672,362	3,959,155	5,004,956
Total	31,607,721	36,483,575	43,913,026
Party expenses	49,880	15,856	30,472
Diplomatic expenses	5,320	4,088	7,862
Administrative expenses of home affairs	236,993	352,536	406,999
Financial administration expenses	1,378,978	572,797	2,725,880
Educational expenses	1,277,800	1,993,597	3,590,275
Military expenses	40,256,960	45,412,781	59,956,742
Others	13,442,491	7,595,984	3,772,706
Total	56,648,422	55,947,639	70,490,936
Balance	-25,040,701	-19,464,064	-26,577,910

*excise on cloth, rolled tobacco, cotton yarn, matches and cement

The Guangdong national treasury never turned a profit under Chen Jitang, this angered Chiang Kai-Shek who in 1931 (prior to Chen's large military expansion) complained that Chen had claimed the entire national treasury to defray his own military spending and accordingly his military expenditure. According to the central government, regulations should not exceed 1,500,000 a month, yet Chen claimed 4,300,000 yuan a month, triple the amount of men he retained in 1931. He additionally earned 800,000 yuan a month from the Guangxi territories he occupied and did not report this to the central government at all.

== Social policies ==
During the Nanjing Decade, the Nationalists promoted secularism and enacted a series of campaigns to eliminate activities deemed superstitious. From 1927 to 1937, the Nationalist government condemned folk religious practices as superstition and sought to eliminate these practices through anti-superstition campaigns. The 1928 "Standards for retaining or abolishing gods and shrines" formally abolished all cults of gods with the exception of human heroes such as Yu the Great, Guan Yu and Confucius.

The Nationalist government banned the professional practices of the "three aunties and six grannies": Buddhist and Daoist nuns, female fortune-tellers, female healers, female shamans, procuresses, female matchmakers, brothel madams, and midwives. In its campaign against superstition, the Nationalist government condemned men who practiced arts deemed superstitious as disreputable, deeming them "unproductive" and "useless to society." Male ritual professions condemned in this way included shamans, fortune tellers, and geomancers, among others.

In Jiangxi, the New Life Movement was driven by the motivation of Chiang Kai-Shek and his encirclement campaigns to eradicate communism in the province. The movement was intended to mobilise society against communism and provide a viable alternative system of administration. Xiong Shihui was the long term governor of Jiangxi in between 1931 and 1942. The association was organised at a county level by the end of 1935c in Jiangxi alone there were associations in 64 counties, 2 townships and 2 special districts.

By 1935, the Movement was openly collaborating with the YMCA and Churches within China, with New Life corps of up to 10 members being formed to disseminate the principles of the movement at a grassroots level, as well as during Church services, with Chiang and his wife openly appointing Christian leaders into the movement and visiting them calling for cooperation with the movement.

The Government additionally re-organised schools from the bao level up and formed Sun Yat-Sen's People's Schools. Central government funding for education increased from 23,290,000 Yuan in 1933 to 55,400,000 Yuan in 1936, though the total amount of funding for education cannot be ascertained as local schools were additionally subsidised by the local elites, whose contribution was not included in government figures. The People's Schools accepted pupils between the ages of 10-16 and adults 16-50. The New Life Movement had its teachings woven into the curriculum: teaching included writing, reading, maths, the Three Principles of the People, communist atrocities, traditional morals, citizenship, physical education and self-defence. It also promoted local agriculture, co-operatives and New Life principles, such as by teaching the principles of cleanliness and orderliness. Lessons around filial piety in particular were emphasized in terms of self-sacrifice for one's nation. In 1934, Jiangxi had 47 counties and 5 special districts who had 1,168 people's schools with 56,500 students and 2,025 teachers at an annual cost of 65,022 Yuan.

The bao-level schools were also aimed towards eliminating illiteracy in both children and adults in rural areas. Attendance was compulsory for children aged 6–15 without previous education, who attended a maximum of 4 years of instruction, as well as adults who had dropped out of schools, who were to attend night classes and obtain a diploma after 6 months. Whilst the People's Schools obtained money from the provincial government, Military Affairs Council and the Boxer Indemnity fund, the bao-level schools obtained funding from the provincial and local governments as well as the local elites. In 1935, there were 14,448 schools; a total of 54.3% of bao had their own school and this percentage rose as the total number of schools grew to 17,938 in 1937.

== See also ==
- Party-state capitalism
- Timeline of events leading to World War II in Asia

== References and further reading ==
- Parks Coble. The Shanghai Capitalists and the Nationalist Government 1927–1937. (Cambridge, MA: Harvard University Press, 1986). ISBN 9780674805361.
- Lloyd E. Eastman. "Nationalist China during the Nanking Decade 1927–1937." In The Cambridge History of China: Volume 13: Republican China 1912–1949, edited by John K. Fairbank and Albert Feuerwerker. 116-67. Cambridge: Cambridge University Press, 1986.
- Harrison, Henrietta (2001), China. Inventing the Nation, London: Oxford University Press. ISBN 0340741333
- Rawski, Thomas G. (1989). Economic Growth in Prewar China. Berkeley: University of California Press. ISBN 0520063724.
- Sheridan, James E. (1975). China in Disintegration: The Republican Era in Chinese History, 1912-1949. New York: Free Press. ISBN 0029286107.
- Hans Van De Ven. China at War: Triumph and Tragedy in the Emergence of the New China, 1937-1952. (London: Profile Books, 2017; Cambridge, MA: Harvard University Press, 2018). ISBN 9781781251942. China at War: Triumph and Tragedy in the Emergence of the New China 1937-1952.
- Peter Zarrow. China in War and Revolution, 1895–1949. Includes Chapter 13: "The Nanjing decade, 1928–1937: The Guomindang era" (pp. 248–270). Routledge, 2005. ISBN 0-415-36448-5.
