= War in Ningxia (1934) =

War in the Warlord era of China

- Part of the Nanjing decade
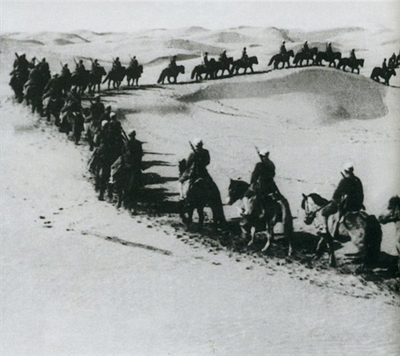
- Cavalrymen of the Ma clique around 1933
Date	January – April 1934
Location	Ningxia, Republic of China
Result	Ma clique and allies victory: 41st Army disbanded and remnants absorbed into Yan Xishan's Shanxi Army

Belligerents
Ma clique: Ningxia forces; Qinghai forces; Gansu forces; Shanxi clique Nationalist government of China	41st Army (Sun Dianying's private army)

Commanders and leaders
Ma clique: Ma Hongkui; Ma Hongbin; Ma Bufang; Ma Zhongying Shanxi clique: Yan Xishan Nationalists: Zhu Shaoliang	Sun Dianying

Units involved
Ma armies, including Muslim cavalry Shanxi Army National Revolutionary Army (NRA): Suiyuan and Gansu forces; Chinese Air Force	Unknown

Strength
Unknown, tens of thousands	50,000–60,000

The war in Ningxia of 1934, also known as Sun Dianying Campaign, was a minor civil war for control over the Republic of China's province of Ningxia, fought between the warlord Sun Dianying and an alliance against him, consisting of the Ma clique, Governor Yan Xishan of Shanxi, and the Nationalist government of China. The conflict erupted as the unintended consequence of a plan by China's supreme leader, Chiang Kai-shek, to weaken the Ma clique, and resulted in the destruction of Sun Dianying's private army.

== Background ==
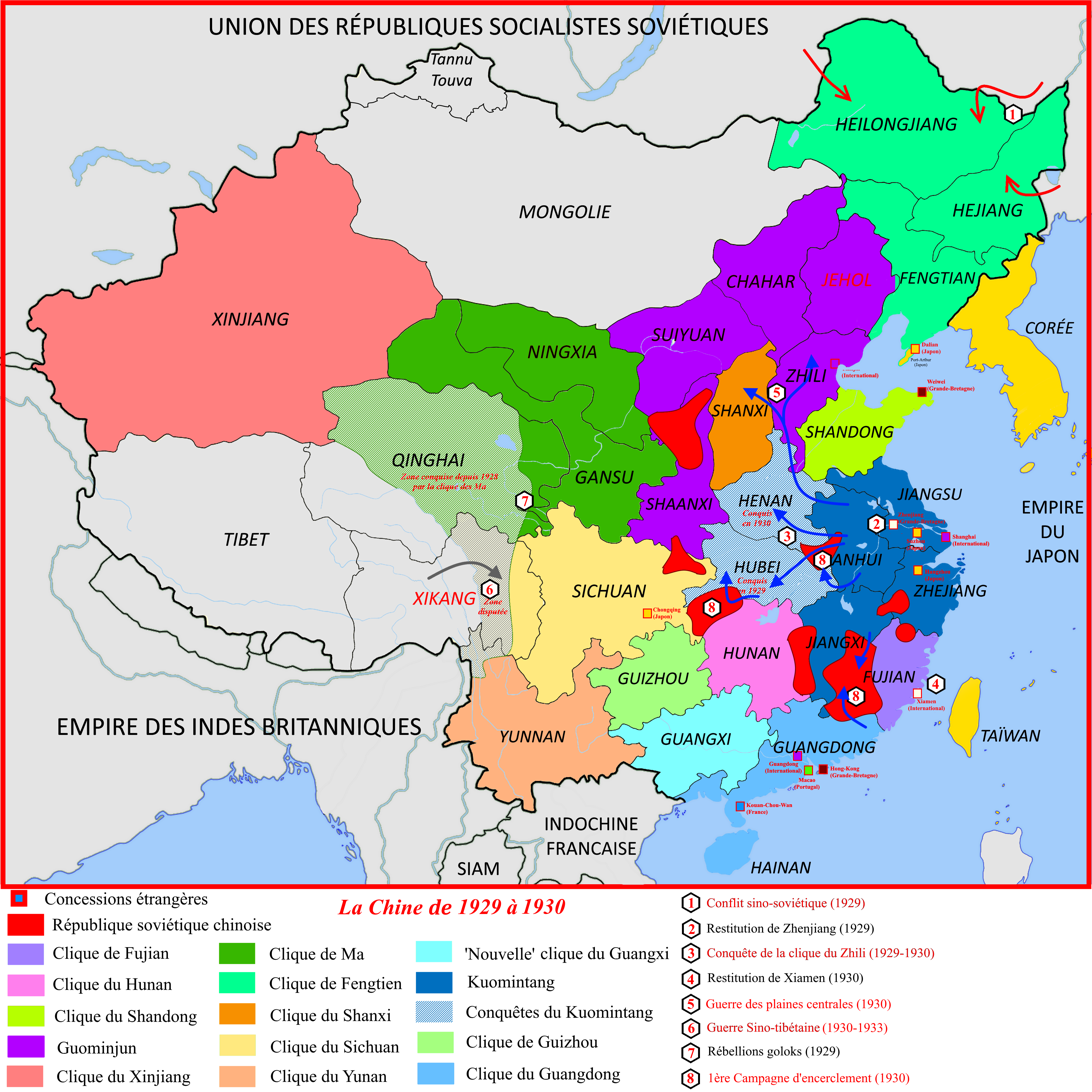
China in 1929/30; territories held by the Ma clique in dark green

In the early 1930s, the Republic of China was politically unstable and divided, with the Nationalist government of Nanjing only in control of parts of the country. Most of China remained in the hands of warlords who had risen to power in the previous decades of internal conflict. Despite having nominally accepted the central government's authority, these warlords used private armies to rule their fiefdoms with impunity and often acted against the orders of Chiang Kai-shek, China's supreme leader. One of the most powerful groups of warlords was the Ma clique, consisting of several related strongmen who controlled the northwestern provinces of Ningxia, Qinghai, and Gansu. Chiang desired to weaken the Ma clique so that his government could assert its power over Northwest China, but his attempts at doing so were only of limited success.

One opportunity to strengthen the Nationalist government presented itself in 1933, as result of the activities of another group of defiant warlords: Feng Yuxiang, a long-time political rival of Chiang and former leader of the Northwest Army, had started to organise the Chahar People's Anti-Japanese Army. While this formation was ostensibly intended for fighting the Japanese invasion of Inner Mongolia, Feng was actually rallying anti-Chiang elements and public support to his cause. In response, the Nationalist government attempted to weaken Feng's military strength. One way it did so was by removing National Revolutionary Army (NRA) units from his influence by sending them from Chahar Province to other parts of China.

Chiang Kai-shek consequently developed a plan to undermine both Feng Yuxiang as well as the Ma clique by moving an army sympathetic to Feng into Ma lands. His political rivals would consequently compete for the same territories, weakening each other in the process. Chiang selected the NRA's 41st Army under the command of Sun Dianying for this plot. Sun was notoriously unreliable, having repeatedly changed sides in his military career for opportunistic reasons and bribes; he was also a known opponent of Chiang and had tentatively supported Feng's Anti-Japanese Army. In June 1933, Chiang ordered Sun to move to Qinghai, officially to colonize the underpopulated and underdeveloped Qaidam Basin. Having been unofficially "outlawed" for supporting Feng, Sun had already moved into Suiyuan to evade the government and knew that he had little option other than to accept the order. Furthermore, he hoped that by moving into western China with his 60,000-men strong 41st Army, he could possibly carve out his own territory.

Appointed as "Reclamation Commissioner of Qinghai", Sun consequently led his forces through Suiyuan's deserts toward the Qaidam Basin, while NRA forces loyal to Chiang took up positions behind him in order to prevent the 41st Army from turning back. The Ma clique quickly realised that Sun posed a potential threat to their power, however, and mobilized a strong political opposition to the Nationalist government's strategy. Governor Ma Lin of Qinghai as well as governor Ma Hongkui of Ningxia declared that they would not allow Sun Dianying to move through their territories, let alone settle in them. They threatened to resign unless Chiang Kai-shek revoked his order, which meant they would possibly revolt against his rule.

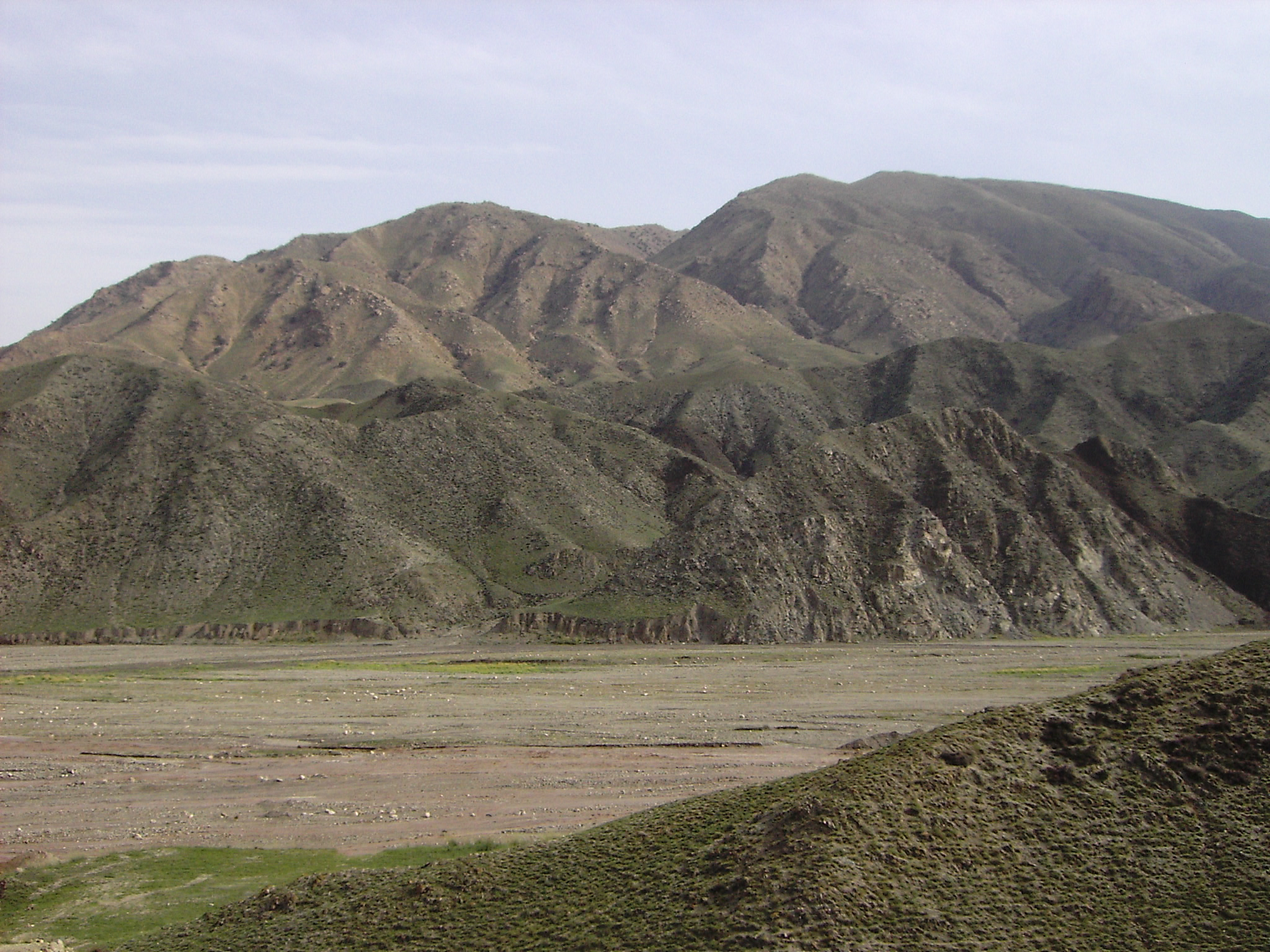
The 41st Army faced starvation at the arid and sparsely populated Ningxia-Suiyuan border.

The Nationalists were unwilling to risk an escalation, and Chiang ordered the 41st Army to halt its advance and wait for further orders in November 1933. Having stopped near the Suiyuan-Ningxia border, the situation of Sun's forces quickly became untenable. They had previously lived off the land and taken supplies from the civilian population, but the area they were now in did not provide enough food for the entire 41st Army. Facing starvation, the morale of Sun's men declined and they threatened to get "out of control". To prevent a mutiny, Sun Dianying had little choice but disobey Chiang's orders and move into Ningxia, thus provoking an open conflict with the Ma clique.

== War ==
The 41st Army advanced into Ningxia in January 1934, overcoming the 10,000 soldiers that Ma Hongkui had already stationed at the border. Sun Dianying proceeded to set up a rival provincial government in Shizuishan, openly declaring his intention to conquer the entire province. Governor Ma Hongkui promptly mobilized his remaining forces, namely his capable Muslim cavalry, as well as infantry troops of much worse quality including spearmen. Other Ma clan members, most importantly Ma Hongbin, Ma Bufang, and Ma Zhongying, sent reinforcements from Gansu and Qinghai. Meanwhile, Chiang Kai-shek knew that he had lost control over Sun, and started to publicly state his support for the Ma clique. He also ordered the mobilization of Yan Xishan's Shanxi Army as well as the Nationalist armies in Suiyuan and Gansu under his loyal follower Zhu Shaoliang against Sun. Chiang hoped that by involving these non-Ma forces in the conflict, he could prevent the Ma clique from single-handedly winning the conflict and thus becoming even stronger than before.

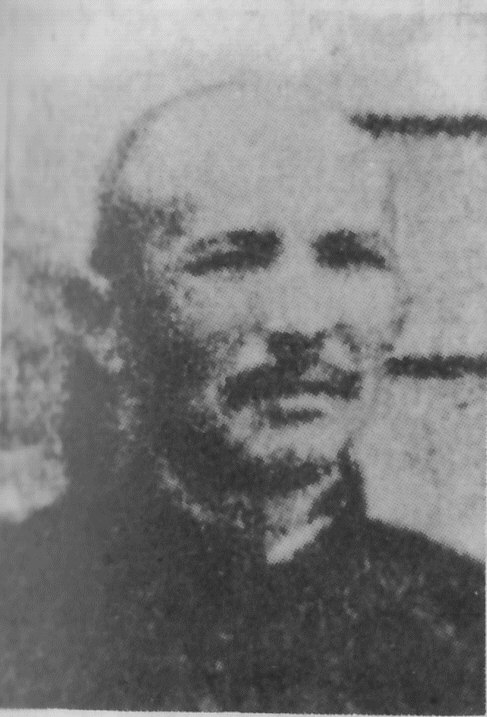
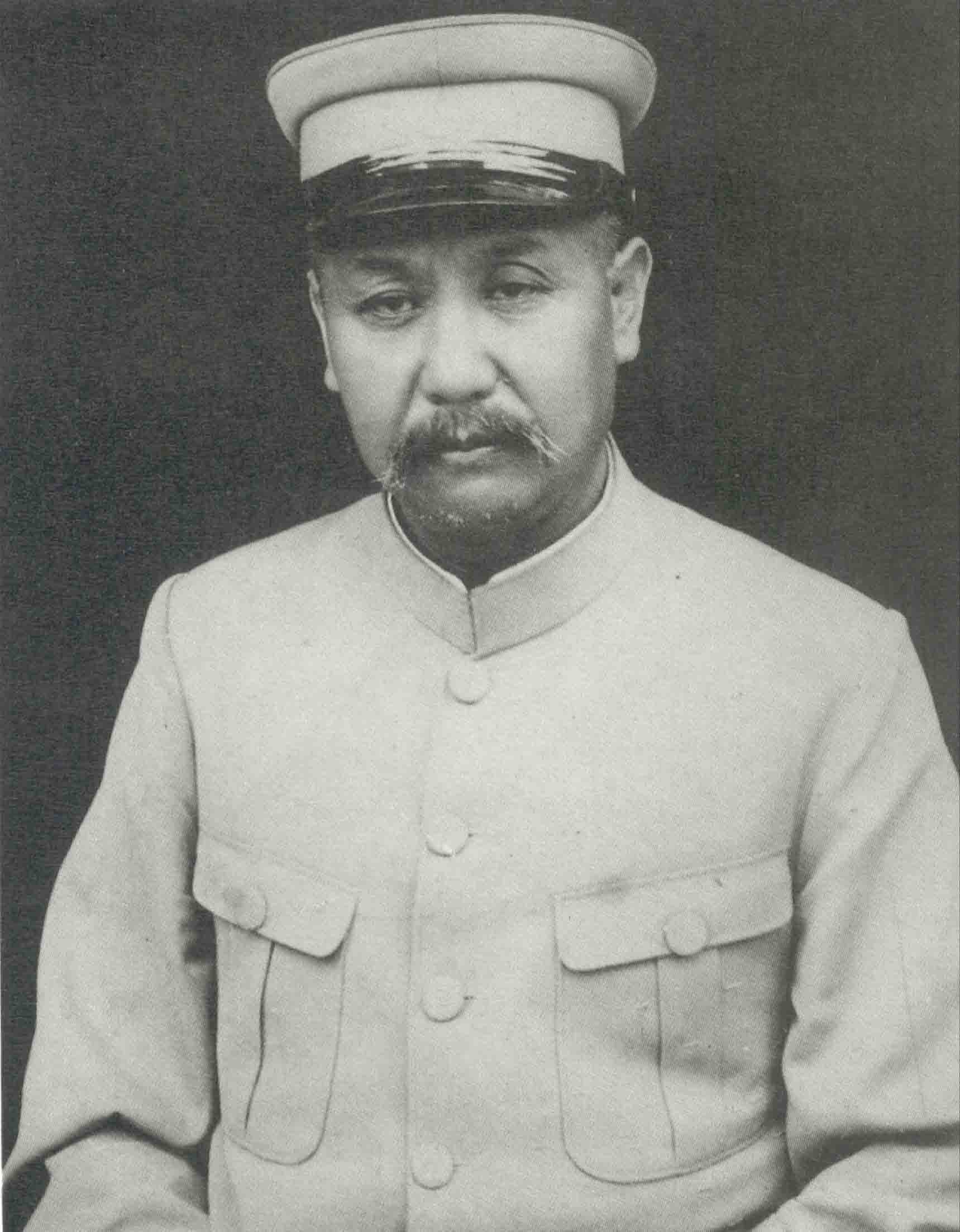
Sun Dianying (left) was eventually cornered by Shanxi governor Yan Xishan (right), resulting in his surrender.

Following its consolidation at Shizuishan, the 41st Army began to advance on Ningxia's capital Yinchuan. Although harassed by the Ma cavalry, Sun's battle-hardened troops managed to advance up to Likangpu, just 13 miles from the capital, before being stopped on 24 January. Soon after, the 41st Army almost managed to defeat Ma Hongkui's army at Pingluo County, but was still unable to capture Yinchuan. Unable to break through, Sun's army grew weaker as casualties mounted, while an increasing number of Ma reinforcements arrived in the province and started to tip the balance in favor of Ma Hongkui. By the end of January, the Ma forces started a major counter-offensive, and the 41st Army began a fighting retreat. At this point, Ma Hongkui even enjoyed the support of the Nationalist Air Force, as Chiang Kai-shek had sent a small number of light bombers and a reconnaissance plane to Ningxia. On 30 January, the Executive Yuan officially stripped Sun of his title as Reclamation Commissioner of Qinghai. The 41st Army was "catastrophically defeated" by the Ma armies in March, and its route of retreat was cut when Yan Xishan's Shanxi Army and the Nationalist Suiyuan army captured Dengkou County. Knowing that he was defeated, Sun surrendered to Yan after mediations by Pang Bingxun in April 1934.

== Aftermath ==
Following Sun's surrender, Yan Xishan offered the 41st Army's surviving soldiers the opportunity to join his own army and most accepted. Yan also gave Sun Dianying a modest estate in Taiyuan, where he was supposed to retire peacefully. Nevertheless, Sun was appointed "high military advisor" for the Military Affairs Commission's Beiping branch by the Nationalist central government in May 1934. When interviewed by Reuters, Sun gave his "meritorious services" to the central government as reason for his appointment. He continued to serve in the NRA for the rest of the Nanjing decade, and again rose to army command in the Second Sino-Japanese War, eventually defecting to the Japanese in 1943.

The war in Ningxia damaged the reputation of the Nationalist government, as it showcased Chiang Kai-shek's political opportunism. Despite this, the Nationalists continued to try to strengthen their position in the northwestern provinces through similar strategies in the following years with minimal success. The Ma warlords ruled their territories until they were defeated by the Communist People's Liberation Army in the late stages of the Chinese Civil War.
