= Sun Dianying =

Chinese warlord and general (1887–1948)

- 孫殿英
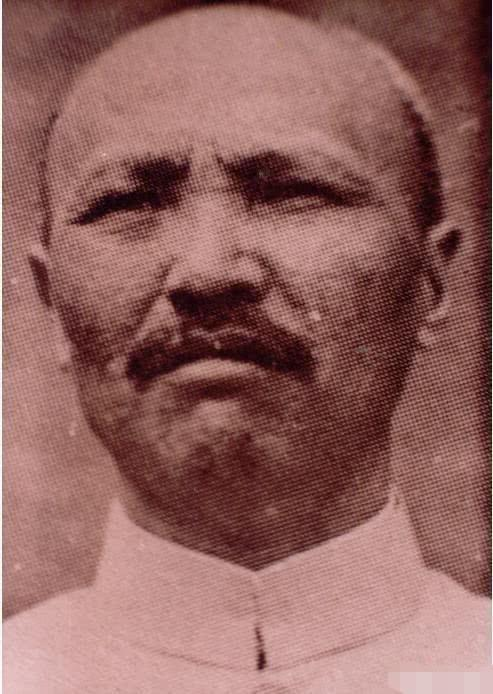
- Born: 1887, 1888, or 1889; Yongcheng, Henan, Qing Empire
- Died: 1946 or 1947; Wu'an, Hebei, China
- Military career
- Allegiance: Republic of China (until 1943, 1945–46/47); Wang Jingwei regime (1943–45)
- Branch: Songxian Pacification Force; Shandong Army; National Revolutionary Army (NRA); Collaborationist Chinese Army
- Rank: General
- Nickname: "Captain Sun"
- Commands: Shandong Army's 35th Division; NRA's 40th Division; NRA's 41st Army; NRA's 5th Army; Collaborationist 6th Group Army District
- Conflicts: Warlord Era; Warlord Rebellion in northeastern Shandong; Central Plains War; Actions in Inner Mongolia (1933–36); War in Ningxia (1934); Second Sino-Japanese War; Chinese Civil War

Sun Dianying (simplified Chinese: 孙殿英; traditional Chinese: 孫殿英; pinyin: Sūn Diànyīng; Wade–Giles: Sun Tien-ying; 1889–1948) was a Chinese bandit leader, warlord, and National Revolutionary Army commander who fought in the Warlord Era, Second Sino-Japanese War, and Chinese Civil War, earning notoriety for changing sides multiple times in course of these conflicts.

== Biography ==
=== Early life as bandit and first military commands ===
Born in 1887, 1888, or 1889 in Yongcheng, Henan, Sun joined a bandit gang in his youth, and eventually became a message-carrier for the Yangshan bandit chief Zhang Ping. He eventually joined the Songxian Pacification Force (SPF), an anti-bandit militia that mostly consisted of ex-bandits. Sun managed to rise to a minor command in the SPF, but he resumed banditry following the suicide of his superior Han Yukun in 1925, or after the SPF's crushing defeat at Xi'an against warlord Feng Yuxiang in 1926.

In any case, Sun wanted to rejoin the armed forces. To achieve this, he led his private army from the western Henan mountains to Anhui. On the way, Sun refrained from plundering the countryside, and thus did not draw much attention. He and his troops were consequently able to launch a surprise attack on Bozhou which they captured almost without a fight. He had thus proven his military capabilities, and was appointed as the 35th Division's commander in the army of warlord Zhang Zongchang in late 1925 or 1926. Sun quickly deserted to the National Revolutionary Army during the Northern Expedition, however, and would repeatedly change sides in the following years. Sometimes, he fought with, sometimes against the Nationalists. In 1928, he plotted the notorious looting of the Eastern Mausoleum of the Manchu emperors. The tombs desecrated included those of the late Empress Dowager Cixi and the Qianlong Emperor. In course of the Warlord Rebellion in northeastern Shandong of 1929, Sun and 7,000 soldiers under his command joined the insurgents against the Nationalist-aligned ruler of eastern Shandong, Liu Zhennian.

In 1930, he fought with warlords Feng Yuxiang and Yan Xishan in the Central Plains War against Chiang Kai-shek's government. Sun's forces were involved in a major friendly fire incident during this war, as they mistakenly fired on Feng's troops at Shangqiu. The two warlords almost went to war over this issue. As the conflict turned against the warlord alliance, Sun's army increasingly suffered from mass desertion, so that he "desperately" launched recruitment campaigns in northern Henan and southern Hubei while the fighting was still ongoing. Realising that the Central Plains War was lost, Sun eventually retreated with his remaining army from the front at Bozhou, and joined the Nationalist-allied forces of Zhang Xueliang. He moved to Shanxi, where his men were reorganized as 40th Division and garrisoned at Jincheng.

=== Campaigns in Inner Mongolia ===
In early 1933, the Imperial Japanese Army launched Operation Nekka to conquer Rehe Province. At the time, Sun commanded the 41st Army of 30,000 men, most of them garrisoned in Lingyuan; one of the soldiers under his command during this conflict was writer Duanmu Hongliang. As the Japanese closed in on Lingyuan, Sun did not resist, as he and his sub-commanders had been bribed by the invaders. They allowed the Japanese to occupy the city almost without resistance. Only a few units under Sun's command refused to retreat from Lingyuan and fought the Japanese to the death, while he moved his army to Chahar Province. As the entire Chinese defense of Rehe collapsed, some of Sun's units lost contact to their headquarters and were left behind; one of his regiments consequently launched a counter-attack on Chifeng, not knowing that other NRA forces had already fled the province. As the Chinese high command initially refused to admit that Sun had been bribed, and some troops under his command had valiantly fought the Japanese, Sun's reputation was slightly rehabilitated in course of the campaign, an opportunity he seized to expand his strength. At the time of the Tanggu Truce, Sun's troops garrisoned the strategic Beijing–Suiyuan Railway.

In May 1933, with Feng Yuxiang organizing the Chahar People's Anti-Japanese Army, Sun also advocated opposition to Japan and criticized Chiang Kai-shek's central government, yet protested his loyalty to Chiang. The national government feared Sun Dianying would cooperate with Feng's Anti-Japanese Army, allowing them to use the railroad to support their forces. However, Sun was also not willing to be involved in a conflict with Chiang. He hoped to be involved in northwest development and control a territory of his own there. In mid-June, when Chiang ordered Sun's army to leave the railroad garrison and open up wasteland in Qinghai, he was willing to go. Chiang's troops replaced his in July, cutting off the Anti-Japanese Army from communication with the rest of China.

Chiang intended the allied northwest Ma clique to have the strength to cope with Sun Dianying and to weaken themselves while competing with him. As the Ma warlords saw through this plot, and strongly protested against Sun moving into their territories, Chiang was forced to give in. He ordered Sun to halt his advance through Suiyuan province in November 1933. However, Sun's forces became short of food and restive from their inactivity.

In January 1934 with his forces threatened with starvation and talk of mutiny, Sun Dianying was forced to march his 60,000-man army west from Suiyuan province into Ningxia, governed by Ma Hongkui. Supported by his fellow Ma warlords Ma Hongbin, Ma Bufang, and Ma Buqing, Hongkui resisted, starting a war for Ningxia. Both sides battled for three months, with heavy losses. In March, Sun's army was defeated by the Ma forces, while his route of retreat was cut off by Yan Xishan and troops loyal to Chiang Kai-Shek. He consequently surrendered in April, and went to Taiyuan to live in seclusion, while the remnants of his defeated troops were incorporated into Yan Xishan's provincial forces. Just one month later, however, Sun was appointed "high military advisor" for the Military Affairs Commission's Beiping branch by the central government.

=== Second Sino-Japanese War ===
In 1937, when the Second Sino-Japanese War erupted, Sun resurfaced once again, commanding troops against the Japanese, taking command of the Hebei-Chahar Guerillas in 1938. He was eventually appointed as general of the NRA's 5th Army, but later on defected to the Japanese in 1943. Joining Wang Jingwei's Reorganized National Government of the Republic of China, he was given command of the Collaborationist Chinese Army's 6th Group Army District which guarded the southern Beijing–Hankou railway, and was made a member of its National Military Council. In August 1943 his troops were defeated by PLA forces in the Linnan Campaign.

When the Second Sino-Japanese War was over, Sun participated in the Chinese Civil War on the side of the Nationalists. He was eventually defeated by People's Liberation Army forces and taken prisoner. In 1946 or 1947, he died in the POW camp of Wu'an.

== See also ==
- Warlord era

== Bibliography ==
- Billingsley, Phil (1988). Bandits in Republican China. Stanford, California: Stanford University Press.
- Graefe, Nils (2008). Liu Guitang (1892-1943): einer der grössten Banditen der chinesischen Republikzeit [Liu Guitang (1892-1943): One of the greatest bandits of the Chinese Republican era] (in German). Wiesbaden: Harrassowitz Verlag.
- Jowett, Phillip S. (2004). Rays of The Rising Sun, Armed Forces of Japan's Asian Allies 1931–45, Volume I: China & Manchuria. 26 Willow Rd., Solihull, West Midlands, England: Helion & Co. Ltd. ISBN 1874622213.
- Jowett, Philip S. (2017). The Bitter Peace. Conflict in China 1928–37. Stroud: Amberley Publishing. ISBN 978-1445651927.
- Lin, Hsiao-ting (2011). Modern China's Ethnic Frontiers: A Journey to the West. Abingdon-on-Thames: Routledge.
- Powell, J.B. (1934). The China Monthly Review. Volume 68. March–May 1934. Shanghai: Millard Publishing.

== Sources ==
- 民国军阀派系谈 (The Republic of China warlord cliques)
- 中国抗日战争正面战场作战记 (China's Anti-Japanese War Combat Operations)
  - Author : Guo Rugui, editor-in-chief Huang Yuzhang
  - Jiangsu People's Publishing House
  - Date published: 2005–7–1
  - ISBN 7-214-03034-9
- China and Eurasia Forum Quarterly, Volume 5, No. 1; Nationalists, Muslim Warlords, and the “Great Northwestern Development” in Pre-Communist China by Hsiao-ting Lin, p. 121-142 (2007)
  - ©Central Asia-Caucasus Institute& Silk Road Studies Program
  - ISSN 1653-4212
