= Ningxia Campaign =

Ningxia Campaign or Ningxia War may refer to:

- Ordos Campaign (1592), also known as Ningxia Campaign
- War in Ningxia (1934)
- Ningxia Campaign (1949)

== See also ==
- Mongol conquest of Western Xia, largely fought in Ningxia
