= Linnan Campaign =

Second Sino-Japanese War campaign

The Linnan Campaign was one of the battles of the Eighth Route Army in the Second Sino-Japanese War. As the Weinan Campaign was concluding, the 129th Division of the Eighth Route Army followed up the victory by launching the Linnan Campaign with part of the strength of the Taihang Military Area Command and the South Hebei Military Command. In this campaign, they annihilated the main force of the 24th Group Army of the Collaborationist Chinese Army of the Wang Jingwei Government, led by Pang Bingxun and Sun Dianying, which was entrenched in the southern Taihang Mountain area to the west of the Beiping-Hankou Railway.

The Linnan Campaign started at 0:30 am on August 18, 1943, and by 12:00 am the following day, all the puppet troops in the city were wiped out while the Japanese troops were besieged at Toudaoying. Starting on August 20, the Eighth Route Army exploited the military victory to press on, and recover Dongyaoji, Lijiachang, Hebiji, Hejian, Yuankang and other places. Afterwards, it repulsed the attack by over 1,400 Japanese reinforcing troops at Anyang and Huixian.

In the Linnan Campaign, the Eighth Route Army claimed it annihilated over 7,000 Japanese and puppet troops, shot down one Japanese aircraft and captured some 80 enemy strongholds while taking 790 casualties.
