= Zhang Fakui =

Chinese general (1896–1980)

Chang Fat-kwei CBE
- 張發奎
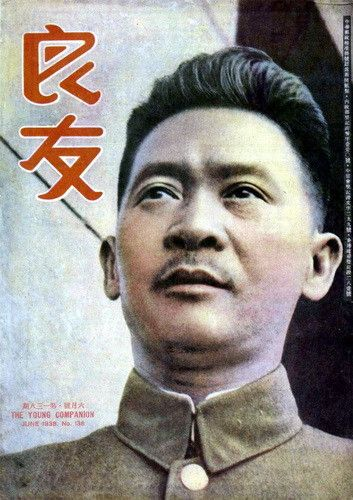
- Chang on the cover of The Young Companion, June 1938

3rd Commander-in-Chief of the Republic of China Army
- In office 9 February 1949 – 26 June 1949
- President: Li Zongren
- Preceded by: Yu Hanmou
- Succeeded by: Gu Zhutong

Personal details
- Born: 2 September 1896 Shixing County, Guangdong, Qing Empire
- Died: 10 March 1980 (aged 83) British Hong Kong
- Awards: Order of the British Empire
- Nickname: Hero of the Iron Army

Military service
- Allegiance: Republic of China
- Years of service: 1912–1949
- Rank: General
- Unit: 4th corps
- Commands: 4th corps, Commander in Chief 8th Army Group, Commander in Chief 4th War Area
- Battles/wars: Northern Expedition, Nanchang Uprising, Guangzhou Uprising, Central Plains War, Anti-Communist Encirclement Campaigns, Second Sino-Japanese War, Chinese Civil War

Chinese name
- Traditional Chinese: 張發奎
- Simplified Chinese: 张发奎
Transcriptions
Standard Mandarin
- Hanyu Pinyin: Zhāng Fākuí
- Wade–Giles: Chang Fa-kuei
- IPA: [ʈʂáŋ fá.kʰwěɪ]
Yue: Cantonese
- Jyutping: Zoeng^{1} Faat^{3}-kwai^{1}

Chang Fat-kwei CBE (Chinese: 張發奎; pinyin: Zhāng Fākuí; Wade–Giles: Chang Fa-kuei; 2 September 1896 – 10 March 1980) was a Chinese Nationalist general who fought against northern warlords, the Imperial Japanese Army and Chinese Communist forces in his military career. He served as commander-in-chief of the 8th Army Group and commander-in-chief of the National Revolutionary Army ground force before retiring in Hong Kong in 1949.

== Life ==
=== Early life ===
Zhang Fakui was born in 1896 in Shixing County, Guangdong province. He entered a private learning facility at a young age and went to Guangzhou to become an apprentice before joining the local militia. He entered elementary military academy in Guangdong in 1912 and then went to Wuhan's military high school. He served as Sun Yat-Sen's personal bodyguard and was appointed as a battalion commander of the newly created 4th Corps of the National Revolutionary Army. In 1923 he joined the campaign (East Expedition of the National Revolution Army) to dislodge the anti-Sun Guangdong clique warlord Chen Jiongming from power and was promoted to regiment, brigade and then division commander. During the Northern Expedition he led the 4th Corps and defeated Wu Peifu's warlord armies in central China. The 4th Corps became known as the Iron Army. Zhang was lauded by the public as the "Hero of the Iron Army". When Chiang Kai-shek unleashed his forces against the communists in the Shanghai Massacre on April 12, 1927, Zhang stayed with Wang Jingwei's Wuhan government. He was appointed to command both the 4th and 11th Corps. In the same month both Kuomintang (KMT) governments launched separate campaigns against the northern warlords, and Zhang again scored a major victory against Marshal Zhang Zuolin's Fengtian clique in Henan province. He was then promoted to commander-in-chief of the 4th Area Army and prepared to attack Nanjing. When Wang Jingwei and Chiang Kai-shek reconciled in July 1927, many communist officers under his command mutinied, resulting in the Nanchang Uprising. Zhang's army defeated the communists and chased the mutineers across into Fujian, then he returned to his home province. While in Guangdong, he drove out the New Guangxi clique and again supported Wang Jingwei over Chiang Kai-shek. The remaining communists in his army used the confusion to launch the Guangzhou Uprising, which Zhang immediately quelled with three divisions. However, he was blamed for the fiasco and resigned his command. Before the outbreak of the Second Sino-Japanese War, he participated in a series of local conflicts in order to stop the growing influence of Chiang Kai-shek's Nationalist Government in his province and was an active member during the Central Plains War against the Nanjing government. In 1936 he and Chiang reconciled and he was appointed commander-in-chief of Zhejiang, Jiangxi, Anhui and Fujian border regions, to eradicate communist activities in those places.

=== World War II ===
During the Second Sino-Japanese War, Zhang Fakui commanded the 8th Army Group in the Battle of Shanghai in 1937, 2nd Army Corps in the Battle of Wuhan in 1938. He Commanded 4th War area from 1939 to 1944, defending Guangdong and Guangxi against the Japanese in South China, achieving a victory in the Battle of South Guangxi. He then was appointed as commander in Chief of the Guilin War Zone during the Japanese Operation Ichigo. As Commander in Chief 2nd Front Army he accepted the surrender of the Japanese Twenty-Third Army in Guangdong at the end of the War.

There was a unique feature for the telephone conversations with Chiang Kai-shek, because Zhang was a Hakka, and the two had difficulties in understanding each other: instead of simply hanging up the phone after giving out orders like he did to everyone else, during the conversation with Zhang, Chiang always asked Zhang if he understood what he had just said, and Chiang always waited until after Zhang gave an affirmative answer.

During the struggle against the Japanese, Zhang was among the first Army Corps commanders to ask the Chinese military to change its code because he discovered that Japanese could easily decode the Chinese code at the early stage of the war. After the war he was made to march into Hong Kong accept the surrender of the Japanese troops and stayed until the restoration of the British. He was awarded Commander of the Order of the British Empire (CBE); his medal was presented by Governor of Hong Kong Sir Mark Young in May 1947. (The Straits Times, 3 May 1947)

Zhang was nicknamed Zhang Fei, after the historical Three Kingdoms figure.

=== Chinese Civil War ===
After the Second Sino-Japanese War, He was put in charge of Guangdong province and then named as one of President Chiang Kai-shek's military advisors. After the disastrous Huaihai Campaign, Vice President Li Zongren took over as acting President, Zhang was named as chief military administrator of Hainan and commander-in-chief of Nationalist ground forces in March 1949. He did not retreat to Taiwan with his commander Xue Yue. He stayed in Hong Kong.

=== Vietnamese Revolution ===
Zhang Fakui was instrumental in the Kuomintang support of Vietnamese revolutionary organizations and parties against the French Imperialist occupation of Indochina. He assisted the Kuomintang of Vietnam (VNQDD). Based in Guangxi, Zhang established the Viet Nam Cach Menh Dong Minh Hoi meaning "Viet Nam Revolutionary League" in 1942, which was assisted by the VNQDD to serve the KMT's aims. The Chinese Yunnan provincial army, under the KMT, occupied northern Vietnam after the Japanese surrender in 1945, the VNQDD tagging alone, opposing Ho Chi Minh's communist party. The Viet Nam Revolutionary League was a union of various Vietnamese nationalist groups, run by the pro-Chinese VNQDD. Its stated goal was for unity with China under the Three Principles of the People, created by KMT founder Sun and opposition to Japanese and French Imperialists. The Revolutionary League was controlled by Nguyen Hai Than. General Zhang blocked the Communist Party of Vietnam, and Ho Chi Minh from entering the league, as his main goal was Chinese influence in Indochina. The KMT utilized these Vietnamese nationalists during World War II against Japanese forces.

Zhang worked with Nguyen Hai Than, a VNQDD member, against French Imperialists and Communists in Indochina. General Chang Fa-kuei planned to lead a Chinese army invasion of Tonkin in Indochina to free Vietnam from French control, and to get Chiang Kai-shek's support.

=== Retirement ===
In June 1949, Zhang resigned and moved to British Hong Kong. He later became the President of the Tsung Tsin Association, the umbrella body for Hakka people in Hong Kong. He had built schools back in his native village. He was the organizer of the First World Hakka Congress in Hong Kong and died there in 1980. He stayed neutral leaning neither to the Communists nearby or his previous Nationalist Government. Despite numerous pleas from both Taiwan and the mainland, he never visited either place. When he died, his old subordinate communist Hakka leader Ye Jianying, by now a Marshal in the PLA, and contemporary Taiwan's leader Chiang Ching-kuo sent their condolence letters to express their sorrow.

== Military career ==
- 1926 General Officer Commanding IV Corps
- 1926 - 1927 General Officer Commanding 12th Division
- 1927 Retired
- 1936 - 1937 Commander in Chief Zhejiang-Fujian-Anhui-Jiangxi Border Area
- 1937 - 1938 Commander in Chief 8th Army Group
- 1937 Commander in Chief Right Wing 3rd War Area
- 1938 Commander in Chief 2nd Army Corps, Battle of Wuhan
- 1939 - 1944 Commander in Chief 4th War Area
- 1944 Commander in Chief Guilin War Zone
- 1944 - 1945 Commander in Chief 2nd Front Army
