= Shanxi clique =

- 晉系
- Shanxi Provincial Government Seal
- Active: 1911–1937
- Disbanded: 1949
- Country: Republic of China
- Allegiance: Beiyang government Nationalist government (1927–1929; 1930–1949)
- Type: Warlord clique
- Engagements: Bai Lang Rebellion; Northern Expedition; Central Plains War; Battle of Taiyuan

Commanders
- Warlord: Yan Xishan

The Shanxi clique, also known as the Jin clique (Jin being the abbreviated name of Shanxi; Chinese: 晉系; pinyin: Jìn Xì), was one of several military factions that split off from the Beiyang Army during China's warlord era.

== History ==
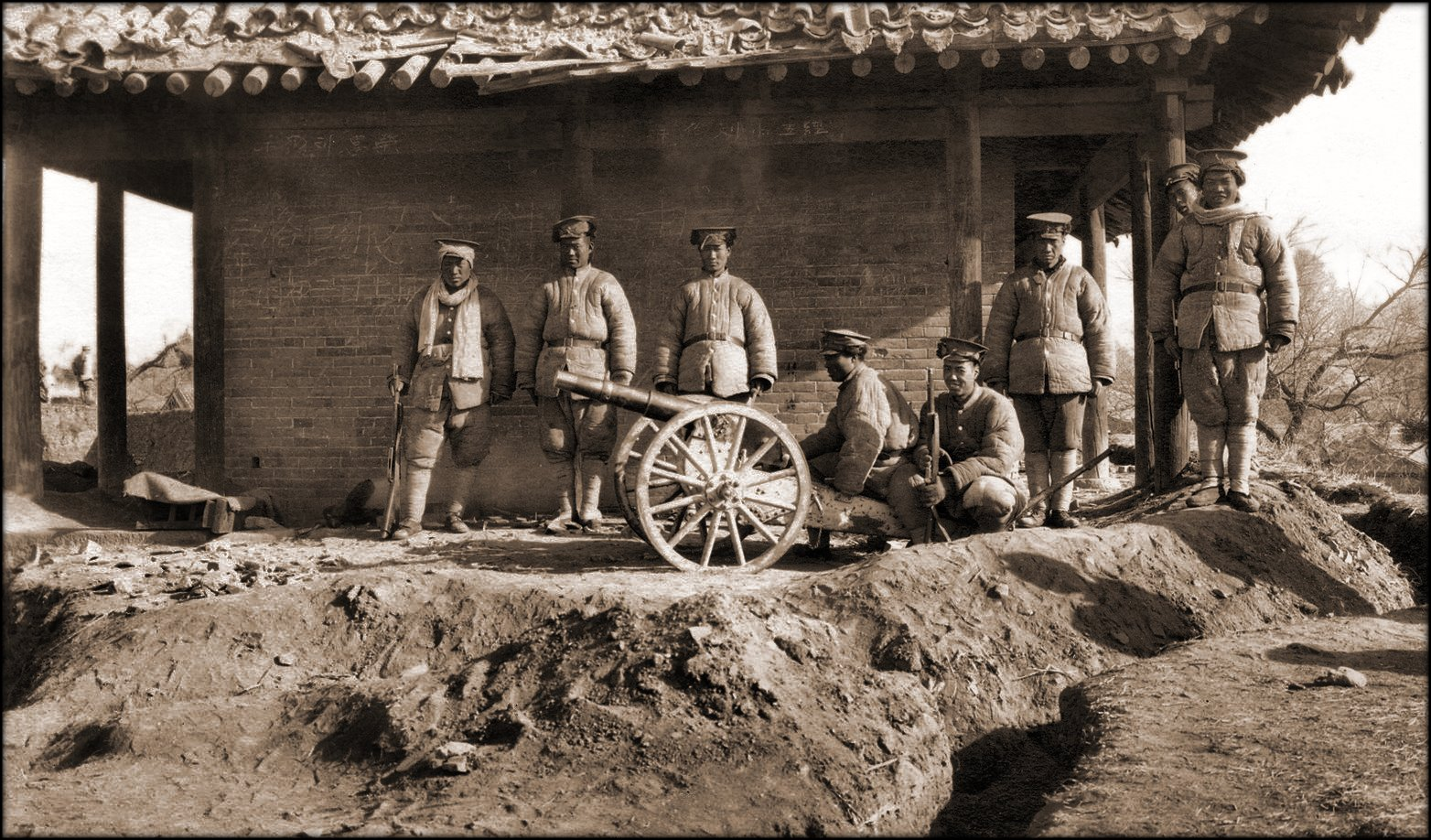
Yan Xishan's soldiers in Liaozhou (now Zuoquan County) in 1925 during the war with Henan warlord Fan Zhongxiu.

Yuan Shikai, after assuming presidency, installed Yan Xishan as the governor of Shanxi. After Yuan's death, Yan consolidated his control over Shanxi and ruled there. He waited for almost one year before expelling Yuan's supporters out of Shanxi.

Though a close associate of Duan Qirui, leader of the Anhui clique, Yan Xishan did not join the Anhui clique. He kept his province neutral from the various civil wars the nation was facing, although he would fight troops from other cliques if they encroached upon the provincial boundaries. In 1927, faced with the overwhelming forces of the National Revolutionary Army, the Fengtian clique issued an ultimatum to Yan to join their side. Yan joined the NRA instead, and drove Fengtian armies from Beijing. As a reward, the Kuomintang allowed the Shanxi clique to expand all the way to the sea at Hebei and Shandong. Displeased with the dictatorship of Chiang Kai-shek, the Shanxi clique together with several other cliques launched the Central Plains War, but was defeated. The clique was significantly weakened by the Japanese invasion which occupied most of their base province. After the war, Yan was unable to defend his province, which fell to the Communists in 1949.

== See also ==
- Warlord Era
- List of warlords and military cliques in the Warlord Era
- History of the Republic of China
