= Yan Xishan =

Chinese general, warlord, and politician (1883–1960)

- 閻錫山
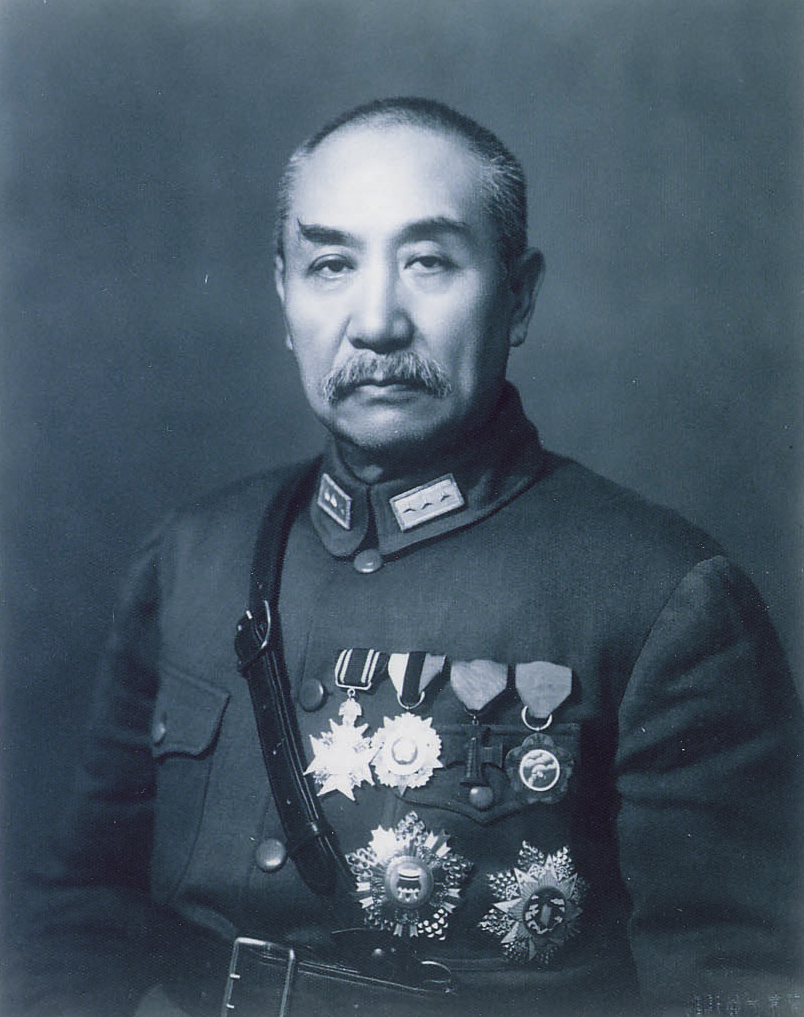

President of the Republic of China
- Acting; 20 November 1949 – 1 March 1950
- Premier: Himself
- Vice President: None (Note: Vice President Li Zongren was in exile during the acting presidency. Per the Order of Succession of Presidents of the Republic of China, Premier Yen thus assumed the acting presidency before Chiang Kai-shek returned office as president.)
- Preceded by: Li Zongren
- Succeeded by: Chiang Kai-shek

4th Premier of the Republic of China
- In office 3 June 1949 – 7 March 1950
- President: Li Zongren (acting); Himself (acting); Chiang Kai-shek
- Vice Premier: Chia Ching-teh; Zhu Jiahua
- Preceded by: He Yingqin
- Succeeded by: Zhou Enlai (Note: As the Premier of the People's Republic of China on Mainland China from 1 October 1949.); Chen Cheng

Personal details
- Born: 8 October 1883 Wutai County, Xinzhou, Shanxi, China
- Died: 23 May 1960 (aged 76) Taipei, Taiwan, Republic of China
- Resting place: Lane 245, Yonggong Road, Yangmingshan National Park
- Party: Kuomintang; Progressive Party
- Children: 5
- Education: Imperial Japanese Army Academy
- Awards: Order of Blue Sky and White Sun; Order of the Sacred Tripod; Order of the Cloud and Banner; Order of Rank and Merit; Order of the Precious Brilliant Golden Grain; Order of Wen-Hu
- Nickname: "Model Governor"

Military service
- Allegiance: Qing Empire; Republic of China
- Branch/service: New Army; National Revolutionary Army
- Years of service: 1909–1949
- Rank: Colonel general
- Commands: 2nd Regiment, Shanxi Div. Beiyang Army; Army of Shanxi; 2nd Military Region, NRA
- Battles/wars: Xinhai Revolution; Northern Expedition; Central Plains War; Second World War; Chinese Civil War

Yan Xishan
- Traditional Chinese: 閻錫山
- Simplified Chinese: 阎锡山
Transcriptions
Standard Mandarin
- Hanyu Pinyin: Yán Xīshān
- Bopomofo: ㄧㄢˊ ㄒㄧㄕㄢ
- Wade–Giles: Yen2 Hsi1-shan1

Courtesy name
- Chinese: 阎百川
- Traditional Chinese: 閻百川
Transcriptions

Yan Xishan (Chinese: 閻錫山; pinyin: Yán Xīshān; Wade–Giles: Yen² Hsi¹-shan¹; 8 October 1883 – 23 May 1960; also romanized as Yen Hsi-shan) was a Chinese warlord who served in the government of the Republic of China from June 1949 to March 1950 as its last premier in mainland China and first premier in Taiwan. He effectively controlled the province of Shanxi from the 1911 Xinhai Revolution to the 1949 Communist victory in the Chinese Civil War. He maintained an ambivalent attitude towards the Communists until 1939, and participated in the Second United Front against the Japanese from 1937. He subsequently negotiated with the Japanese from 1940 to 1943, and allied himself with the Japanese against the Communists from 1944 until fleeing Shanxi in 1949. The resistance of his well-armed forces in Taiyuan posed a major obstacle to Communist victory in the Civil War.

As the leader of a relatively small and land-locked province, he survived Yuan Shikai, the Warlord Era, the Nationalist Era, the Japanese invasion of China and the subsequent civil war, being forced from office only when the Nationalist armies with which he was aligned had completely lost control of mainland China, isolating Shanxi from any source of economic or military supply.

== Early life ==
=== Experience in Japan ===
Yan also joined an even more militant organization of Chinese revolutionaries, the "Dare-to-Die Corps."

=== Return to China ===
When Yan returned to China in 1909, he was assigned as a division commander of the New Army in Shanxi but secretly worked to overthrow the Qing.

== Career in early republic ==
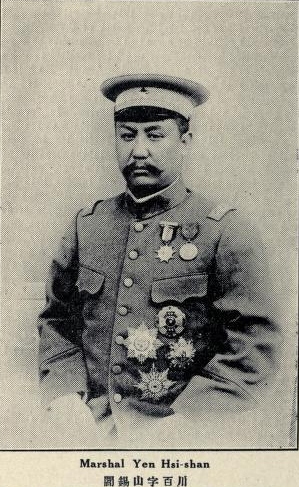
Yan Xishan in the early 1920s, shortly after taking power in Shanxi

=== Conflict with Yuan Shikai ===
In 1911 Yan hoped to join forces with another prominent Shanxi revolutionary, Wu Luzhen, to undermine Yuan Shikai's control of north China, but the plans were aborted after Wu was assassinated. In 1917, shortly after Yuan Shikai's death, Yan solidified his control over Shanxi, ruling there uncontested. After Yuan's death in 1916, China descended into a period of warlordism.

=== Efforts to reform Shanxi ===
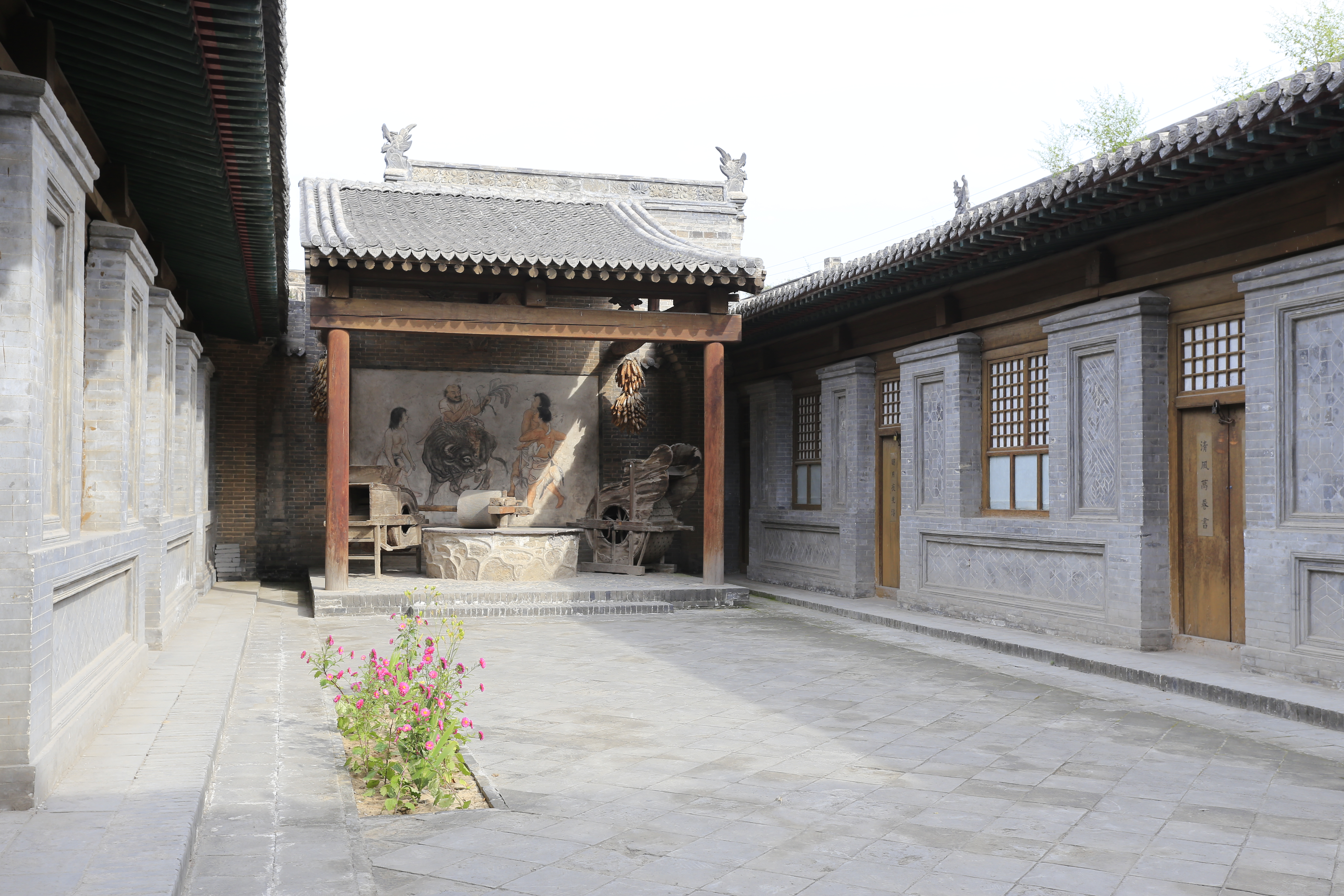
Residence of Yan in Dingxiang, Shanxi.

Yan attempted to modernize the state of medicine in China by funding the Research Society for the Advancement of Chinese Medicine, based in Taiyuan, in 1921. One of less than twenty schools in China at the time, the school had a four-year curriculum and included courses in both Chinese and western medicine. Its courses were taught in English, German, and Japanese. Yan hoped that his support of the school would eventually lead to increased revenues in the domestic and international trade of Chinese drugs, improved public health, and improved public education.

Yan sent students from Shanxi to complete science and engineering degrees at Japanese, American and English universities. In 1936, he provided a scholarship for the future nuclear physicist He Zehui, the daughter of He Cheng, another early member of the Tongmenghui, to embark on a PhD in experimental ballistics at the Technische Universität Berlin.

=== Involvement in Northern Expedition ===
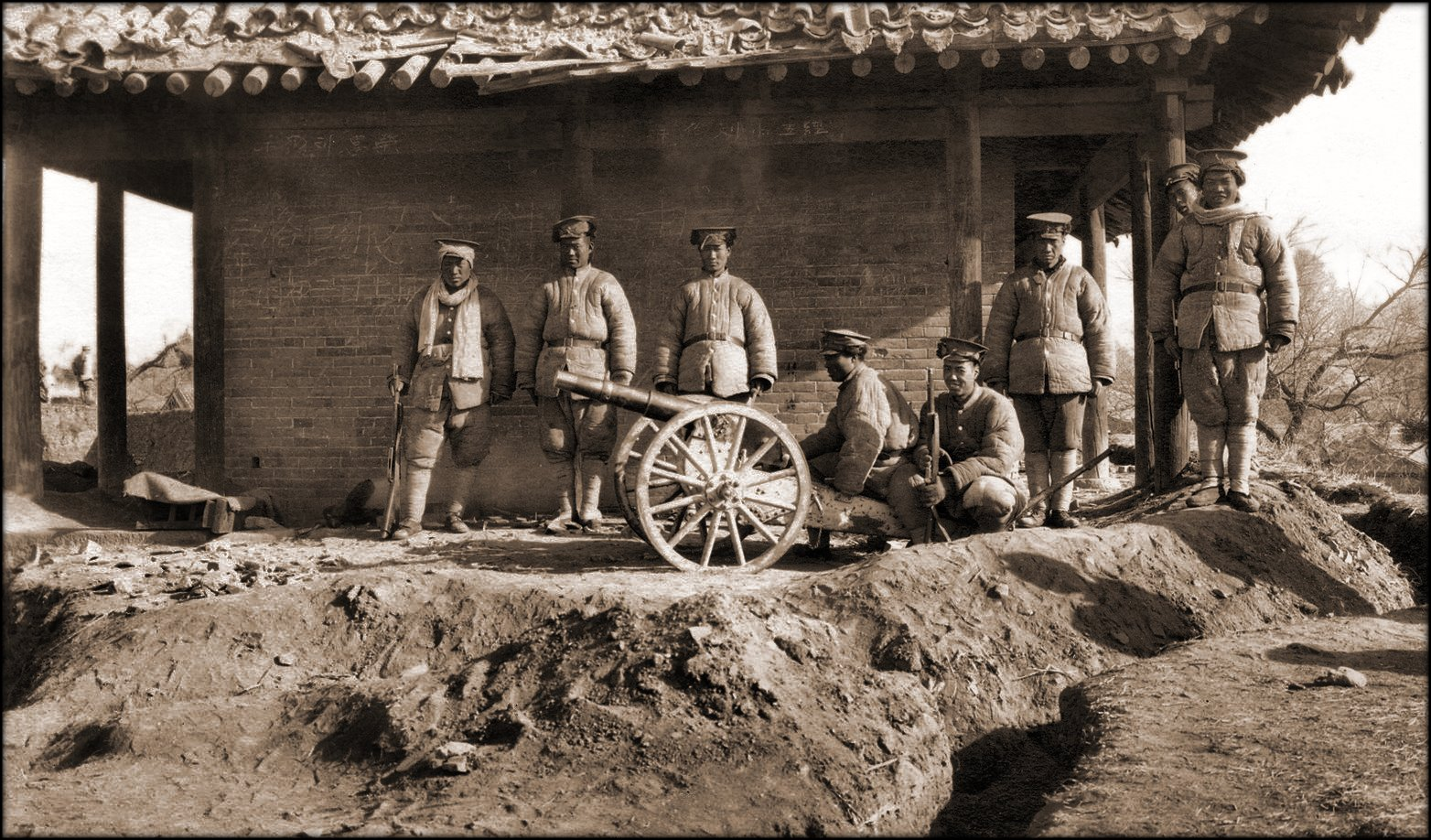
Yan Xishan's soldiers in Liaozhou (now Zuoquan County) in 1925 during the war with the Henan warlord Fan Zhongxiu

Yan's assistance to Chiang was rewarded shortly afterwards by his being named minister of the interior and deputy commander-in chief of all Kuomintang armies.

Yan's support for Chiang's military campaigns and his suppression of Communists influenced Chiang to recognize Yan as the governor of Shanxi and to allow him to expand his influence into Hebei.

=== Involvement in Central Plains War ===
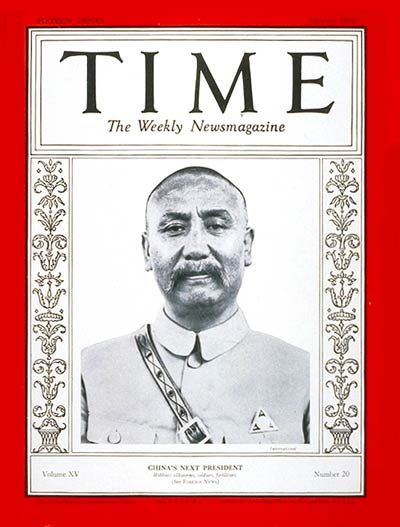
Yan Xishan as "China's Next President" on the cover of the Time magazine, 19 May 1930

During the Central Plains War, the Kuomintang encouraged Muslims and Mongols to overthrow both Feng Yuxiang and Yan. Chiang's defeat of Yan and Feng in 1930 is considered the end of China's Warlord Era.

Yan was unable to match the quality of leadership in Chiang's officer corps and the prestige that Chiang and the Nationalist Army had at the time. Before Chiang's armies defeated Feng and Yan, Yan was billed on the cover of the Time magazine as "China's Next President."

=== Subsequent relationship with Nationalist government ===
Yan sent representatives to negotiate for unity against the Japanese invasion and prevent Chiang's execution.

== Public policies ==
=== Military policies ===
Yan's military doctrine was based on the maintenance of a high-quality, professional core army supplemented by local defense groups. Following the completion of his village reforms in 1922, he established defense groups composed of male villagers aged 18–35, organized in a five-tier system from squads to regional commands. This system allowed him to mobilize large numbers of irregulars while keeping his core forces well-armed and loyal.

=== Attempts at social reform ===
Yan's most ambitious social project was his rural construction movement, which aimed to make the village the foundational layer of society. He reorganized Shanxi's rural administration into a four-tier hierarchy: Village, alley, neighborhood, household.

To modernize the province, he implemented the "Six Policies and Three Tasks". The "Six Policies" included water conservation, tree planting, silkworm cultivation, opium eradication, hair cutting, and discouraging foot binding. The "Three Tasks" were cotton cultivation, afforestation, and animal husbandry. He engaged in a sustained campaign against foot binding, with foot inspectors and fines for those who continued the practice.

=== Attempts to eradicate opium use ===
Yan took a hardline stance against opium, establishing the "Six Policies Assessment Office" to oversee suppression efforts. While hair cutting and foot binding reforms were highly successful, opium eradication proved difficult due to its economic influence and the influx of drugs from neighboring provinces. He established the Opium Suppression Division within his Village Governance Office to enforce anti-opium laws through house-to-house investigations.

=== Limitations of economic reforms ===
Yan's economic strategy focused on state-led industrialization through his "Ten Year Plan", making Shanxi one of the most industrialized provinces in China. At the center of this plan was the Northwestern Industrial Company (NIC), a massive state-owned conglomerate that operated 35 factories and mines, including ironworks, chemical plants, and power stations. To fund these projects, Yan utilized the province's traditional banking expertise.

== Ideology ==
Yan's personal ideology, often referred to as "Yan Xishan Thought", was a unique synthesis of Confucianism, Nationalism, and Socialism. Central to his vision was the belief that the village was the political foundation of the nation, and that self-reliance was the only path to national salvation during a period of foreign imperialism.

=== Influence of Confucianism ===
Yan's governance was based upon Confucian ethics, which he attempted to modernize for a republican era. In 1918, he declared the "Citizen-Oriented Governance Based on Civic Morality, Intelligence, and Wealth", which established four key virtues of trustworthiness, integrity, ambition, and altruism as core moral elements. Yan promoted these virtues through educational books such as What People Must Know and What Families Must Know, which were distributed to every household in Shanxi.

=== Influence of Christianity and Western Thought ===
While primarily a Confucian, Yan was influenced by Western concepts of progress and administrative efficiency. He admired the Japanese model of local autonomy and industrialization, which he had studied firsthand in Tokyo. This influence manifested in his approach to social engineering, where he utilized pilot programs and phased implementation for his reforms.

=== Influence of Chinese Nationalism ===
Yan's nationalism was centered on the preservation of Shanxi as a "Model Province" that could serve as a blueprint for a strong, reunified China. This often led to an ambivalent relationship with the central Kuomintang government; while he ostensibly supported the National Revolutionary Army, his primary loyalty remained to the Shanxi identity he had cultivated. His construction of provincial identity relied on Shanxi's historical role as the heart of Chinese civilization, promoting the province as a "living museum" of Chinese tradition.

=== Influence of socialism and communism ===
Yan's economic policies were often described as "warlord capitalism," but they contained significant state-socialist elements. Influenced by Soviet central planning, Yan's "Ten Year Plan" aimed to establish state-controlled heavy industry to ensure the province's survival. He viewed private capitalism as potentially disruptive and preferred state-sponsored enterprises like the NIC to the control key resources of coal and iron. At the 1920 Jinshan Conference, he explored the idea of "how to effectively organize human groups," which eventually led to his village-based political system designed to enhance social control and productivity.

=== Extent of success ===
By the late 1920s, Yan's reforms had made Shanxi significantly more stable and prosperous than surrounding provinces, gaining the title of "Model Province." However, his self-reliance and his refusal to fully integrate with the national government ultimately limited the province's potential when faced with the dual threats of Japanese invasion and Communist insurgency.

== Second Sino-Japanese War ==
=== Alliance with Communists ===
He allowed Communist agents working under Zhou Enlai to establish a secret headquarters in Taiyuan and released Communists that he had been holding in prison, including at least one general, Wang Ruofei.

=== Fall of Taiyuan ===
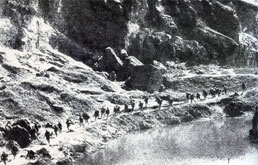
Chinese troops march to defend the mountain pass at Xinkou.

=== Negotiations with Japanese ===
As the Japanese invasion pushed Yan's administration into the southwest corner of Shanxi, he established a base there where he lived in sparse conditions for eight years. During this period, Yan practiced what American diplomat John S. Service described as "eight-faceted glittering gem" diplomacy: maintaining "two faces for the Central Government, two faces for the Japanese, two faces for the Communists, and two more for the people."

In 1940 Yan's old friend, Ryūkichi Tanaka, became chief of staff of the Japanese First Army. Tanaka initiated negotiations to bring Yan into an anti-communist alliance. Yan proposed a policy of co-operating to oppose the communists, which resulted in several direct meetings, including one with Japanese commander Iwamatsu Yoshio in 1942. While Yan never officially signed a "peace" treaty, a virtual ceasefire existed between his forces and the Japanese by 1944, allowing his troops to cross Japanese lines to attack Communist guerrillas.

The efforts of the Japanese Army to convince Yan to cooperate with them was referenced in the Japanese military's monograph Senshi Sōsho as the Operation Targetting Bo (対伯工作) (Note: 'Bo' referred to one of Yan's courtesy name, Bochuan, and the reason why 'Bo' became a codename for the operation was because during talks with Yan's nephew, Yan Yiting, Yan was referred to as 'Bo') or Operation Targetting Yan Xishan (対閻錫山工作). The efforts to appease and win over Yan, the commander of the Second Military Front, were considered a promising operation to undermine the Chinese generals and a first step to collapse the Chongqing government, and was something the Army Ministry, the East Asia Development Board, and the China Expeditionary Army placed great importance on.

A basic agreement and ceasefire arrangement were concluded on 11 September 1941, and detailed provisions of the ceasefire were concluded on 27 October. However, in order to advance the situation, the Japanese side proposed a summit meeting and demanded that Yan issue a declaration of independence to show that he had severed ties with Chiang Kai-Shek. In response, Yan only expressed agreement with the fundamental principles of cooperation, but stated that he would only issue the declaration when he received the military funds and weapons as stipulated in the agreement, which delayed the matter. He argued that his Shanxi clique of more than a hundred thousand troops lacked supply, fighting spirit, and strength, and was under close supervision by the Chongqing Central Army while also in conflict with the Communists. The Japanese Army was unsure if Yan was being sincere or if this was a delaying tactic to build up his army. Moreover, since the agreement was accepted too hastily, the Japanese Army faced difficulty in fulfilling the exaggerated promises they had made to draw in Yan.

Throughout the course of the negotiation, the First Army was sure that Yan was playing both sides and was constantly drafting up plans to annihilate the Shanxi clique. However, the North China Area Army was generally hopeful that they could reach an agreement with Yan, and would always shoot these proposals down. In March 1942, the First Army launched "Operation B" and destroyed a small portion of Yan's Shanxi troops while attempting to isolate the Shanxi clique from Chiang's troops at the opposite bank of the Yellow River by firing artillery shells at the latter. However, the North China Area Army ordered the suspension of the operation in early April after Yan dispatched Zhao Chengshou to negotiate even though the First Army believed that this was a delaying tactic. Then, after Zhao Chengshou returned and Yan refused to attend a meeting with the Japanese on 9 April, the First Army decided to abrogate the existing agreement with Yan in spite of the wishes of the North China Area Army and the China Expeditionary Army. By 22 April, the First Army was intensifying economic blockade and had commenced artillery bombardments on the Shanxi clique, causing Lieutenant General Adachi, chief of staff of the North China Area Army, to contact the army and telling them not to abrogate the existing agreement and engage with the Shanxi clique while the area army was still negotiating with Yan.

In late April, Yan accepted a proposal by Su Tiren, the Shanxi Provincial Governor of Wang Jingwei's Collaborationist Government, for a meeting with the Japanese Army to be held in the Shanxi clique's controlled area of Anping Village on 5 May. As the First Army expected however, the meeting ended up with no result and the commander of the North China Area Army secretly notified the Shanxi clique that he would abrogate the initial agreement on 17 May. After a breakdown in negotiations, the First Army imposed a severe economic blockade and took coercive actions against the Shanxi clique while simultaneously carrying out appeasement and undermining efforts against individual units. They also distributed leaflets detailing the Anping Village meeting in Shaanxi in an attempt to sow discord. In June, having given up on appeasing Yan, the commander of the First Army devised a plan to destroy the core of the Shanxi clique and submitted it to the North China Area Army on the 7th. However, the area army rejected the idea as their plan was to isolate the Shanxi clique and appease them during the Xi'an operation planned for the autumn.

The 69th Division launched attacks against the Shanxi clique until it was ordered to cease military actions on 15 July, during which the division captured many Chinese troops and used them to form the Shanxi Anti-Communist Army in an attempt by the First Army to undermine Yan and engage in anti-communist suppressions. Afterwards, there were attempts from the Yan's side to mend relations and plans from the First Army to once again annihilate the Shanxi clique, but gradually a mood of compromise arose between the two sides, and a renewal effort was adopted to build up partial cooperation and eventually reach full cooperation. As a concrete measure of economic cooperation, the trade of goods began in the spring of 1943. In January 1944, four divisions of the Shanxi clique were relocated to the Fushan and Anze areas for anti-communist measures. In autumn, Yan dispatched his trusted confidant, Zhu Shouguang, to Taiyuan and stationed him there permanently, likely in an attempt to prepare for his return of Shanxi. After that, despite keeping close contact, there were no more attempts by either side until the war ended. Some Japanese officers, like Colonel Kanachi Sasai, a staff officer of the First Army, believed that the operation toward Yan had ended in failure and Yan had succeeded in his objective of self-preservation between the Chongqing government, the Communists, and the Japanese.

=== Relationship with Japanese after 1945 ===
In early August 1945, Yan met with Japanese Chief of Staff Takahashi Tadashi to discuss the terms of surrender. Yan proposed to "co-opt existing military power", requesting to utilize Japanese military resources and personnel to launch a post-war anti-communist offensive. Takahashi agreed in principle, and following the official Japanese surrender on 15 August, Yan returned to Taiyuan on 30 August by an armored train provided and guarded by 500 Japanese soldiers of the First Army.

To prevent Communist forces from seizing the province's urban centers, Yan recruited between 10,000 and 43,000 Japanese soldiers and officers to remain in Shanxi and join his "Provincial Defense Army." Japanese commander Sumita Raishiro remained in Taiyuan as Yan's senior advisor until 1947, while Jono Hiroshi served as a key recruiter for these units. Yan justified their presence to the Nationalist government by claiming it was "easier to feed them" in Shanxi than to repatriate them.

== Chinese Civil War ==
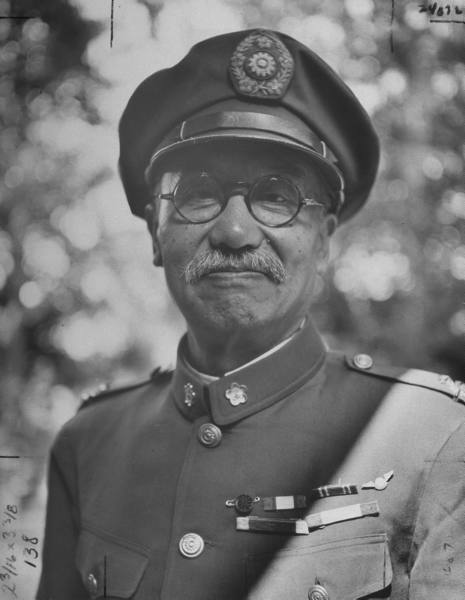
Yan Xishan in 1947

Following his return to Taiyuan, Yan immediately reorganized his forces and puppet provincial troops into the Provincial Defense Army to counter the expanding influence of the Eighth Route Army.

=== Shangdang Campaign ===
In August 1945, as Yan attempted to secure the southern part of the province, his 19th Army under Shi Zebo clashed with Communist forces led by Liu Bocheng and Deng Xiaoping. Despite having Japanese support, Yan's forces suffered a major defeat, losing much of his southern garrison. The Battle of Shangdang was one of the first major military conflicts of the second phase Chinese Civil War, and demonstrated the fragility of the Nationalists.

=== Taiyuan Campaign ===
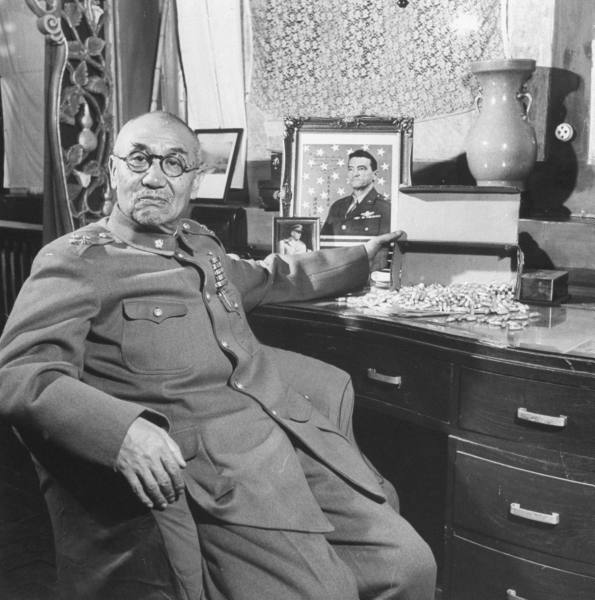
During the Siege of Taiyuan, Yan told foreign journalists that he and his followers would swallow cyanide pills before they let the Communists take Shanxi. Many of his followers committed suicide when Taiyuan fell.

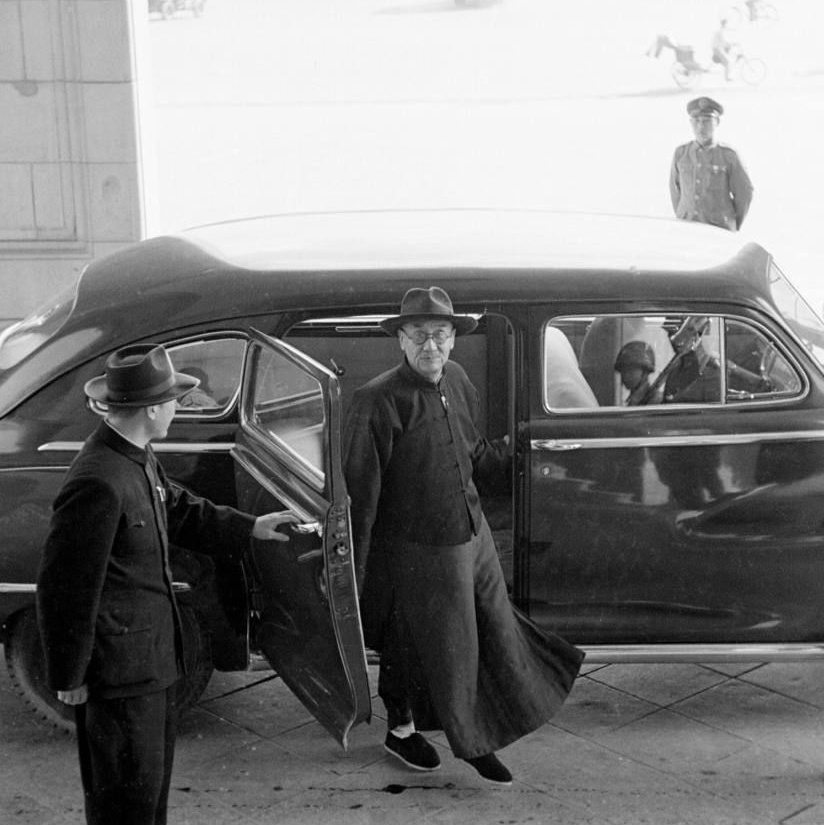
Yan, photographed around the period when he served as Premier of the Republic of China.

== Later life ==
=== Premier of Republic of China ===
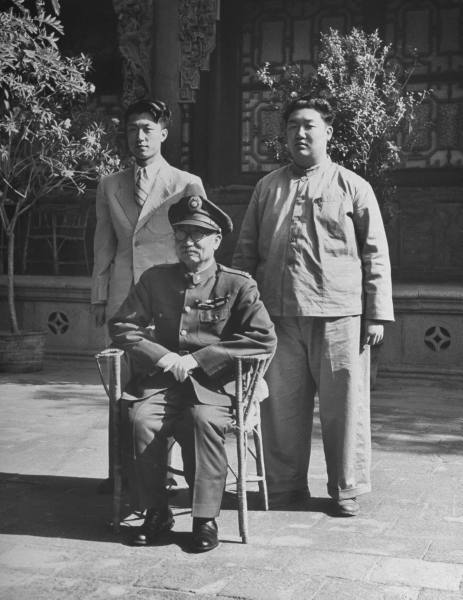
Yan and sons.

=== Retirement in Taiwan ===
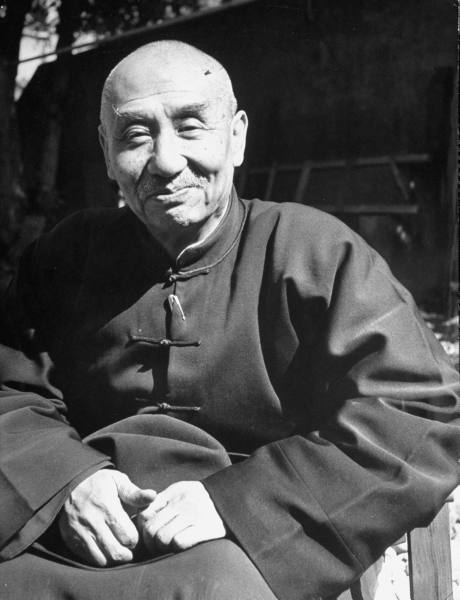
Yan retired from public life in 1950. He spent much of his retirement writing, analyzing contemporary political issues, and promoting Yan Xishan Thought.

Yan Xishan's tomb in Shilin District, Taipei

His late philosophical perspective has been described as "anti-communist and anti-capitalist Confucian utopianism." Several months before the Korean War Yan published a book, Peace or World War, in which he predicted that North Korea would invade South Korea, South Korea would be quickly overcome, the United States would intervene on the side of South Korea, and Communist China would intervene on the side of North Korea. All of those events later occurred over the course of the Korean War.

Yan died in Taiwan on 24 May 1960. He was buried in the Qixingjun region of Yangmingshan. For decades, Yan's residence and grave were cared for by a small number of former aides, who had accompanied him from Shanxi. In 2011, when the last of his aides turned 81 and was unable to care for the residence, the responsibility of maintaining the site was taken over by the Taipei City Government.

== See also ==
- An Chang-nam, Yan Xishan's flight school principal from 1926 to 1930
- History of the Republic of China
- List of Warlords
- Shang Zhen
- Liu Cunhou

== Notes ==
Government offices
Preceded by Ho Ying-chin	Premier of the Republic of China; 1949–1950	Succeeded by Chen Cheng
