= Lianchi, Baoding =

Lianchi 莲池区
- District
- Location in Hebei
- Coordinates (Lianchi government): 38°53′01″N 115°29′50″E
- Country: People's Republic of China
- Province: Hebei
- Prefecture-level city: Baoding
- Time zone: UTC+8 (China Standard)

Lianchi District (simplified Chinese: 莲池区; traditional Chinese: 蓮池區; pinyin: Liánchí Qū) is a district of Baoding, Hebei, People's Republic of China. Lianchi is formed after the merger of Beishi District and Nanshi District in May 2015.

== Administrative divisions ==
Subdistricts:

- Hepingli Subdistrict (和平里街道), Wusi Road Subdistrict (五四路街道), Xiguan Subdistrict (西关街道), Zhonghua Road Subdistrict (中华路街道), Dongguan Subdistrict (东关街道), Lianmeng Subdistrict (联盟街道), Hongxing Subdistrict (红星街道), Yuhua Subdistrict (裕华街道), Yonghua Subdistrict (永华街道), Nanguan Subdistrict (南关街道)

Townships:

- Hanzhuang Township (韩庄乡), Dongjinzhuang Township (东金庄乡), Bailou Township (百楼乡), Nandayuan Township (南大园乡), Jiaozhuang Township (焦庄乡), Yangzhuang Township (杨庄乡), Wuyao Township (五尧乡)
