= Hepingli =

Hepingli (和平里) may refer to the following locations in China:

- Hepingli Subdistrict, Beijing (和平里街道), in Dongcheng District, Beijing
- Hepingli Beijie Station (和平里北街站), station on Line 5 of the Beijing Subway
- Hepingli Subdistrict, Baoding (和平里街道), in Beishi District, Baoding, Hebei
