= Bailou =

Bailou may refer to the following locations in China:

- Bailou, Hebei, a town in Baoding, Hebei
- Bailou, Zhoukou, Henan
- Bailou Township, Sui County, Henan
