= Baoding Military Academy =

- 保定陆军军官学校
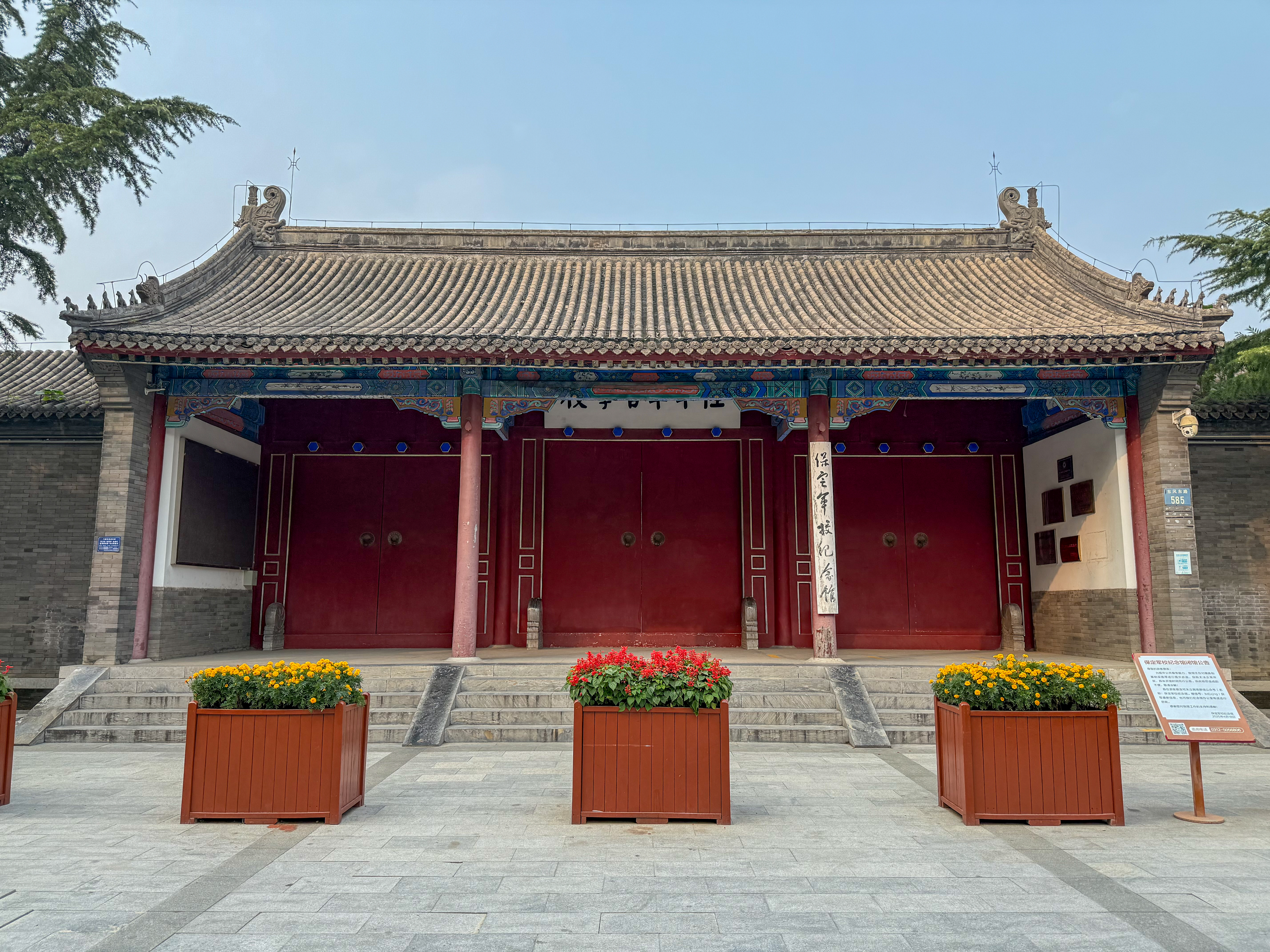
- Entrance of Baoding Military Academy

- Location within Hebei

General information
- Status: Completed
- Type: Historic site
- Location: 585 E Dongfeng Road, Lianchi District, Baoding, Hebei
- Coordinates: 38.8674937°N 115.5259636°E
- Completed: 1902

Baoding Military Academy or Paoting Military Academy (Chinese: 保定軍校; pinyin: Bǎodìng Jūnxiào; Wade–Giles: Pao-ting Chün-hsiao) was a military academy based in Baoding, during the late Qing dynasty and early Republic of China, in the first two decades of the 20th century. For a time, it was the most important military academy in China, and its cadets played prominent roles in the political and military history of the Republic of China. The Baoding Military Academy closed in 1923, but served as a model for the Whampoa Military Academy, which was founded in Guangzhou in 1924. It, along with the Yunnan Military Academy and the Whampoa Military Academy, was one of the "three major strategist cradles in modern China". During the Second Sino-Japanese War, half of 300 divisions in China's armed forces were commanded by Whampoa graduates and one-third were Baoding cadets.

== History ==
To institutionalize military education, Li Hongzhang established the Tianjin Military Academy (天津武備學堂) in 1885, the first Chinese military academy for army officers. As part of his military reforms, he enlisted German advisers to support the academy's development. The move was supported by Anhui Army commander Zhou Shengchuan. The academy was to serve Anhui Army and Green Standard Army officers. Various practical military, mathematic and science subjects were taught at the academy. The instructors were German officers. Another program was started at the academy for five years in 1887 to train teenagers as new army officers. Mathematics, practical and technical subjects, sciences, foreign languages, Chinese Classics and history were taught at the school. Exams were administered to students. The instruction for Tianjin Military Academy was copied at the Weihaiwei and Shanhaiguan military schools. The 'maritime defense fund' supplied the budget for the Tianjin Military Academy, which was shared with the Tianjin Naval Academy. The Tianjin Military Academy in 1886 adopted as part of its curriculum the Romance of the Three Kingdoms. The students were divided into infantry, cavalry, artillery, engineering, and supply departments. Among its alumni were Wang Yingkai and Duan Qirui. Among its staff was Yinchang.

The model was emulated by other influential officials such as Zhang Zhidong, Liu Mingchuan and Yuan Shikai. In 1902, Yuan Shikai, the Viceroy of Zhili Province and the Minister of Beiyang, founded an officer academy in Baoding, the capital of Zhili Province. Baoding was the headquarters for his New Army, which until 1901 was based in Xiaozhan, near Tianjin. The Boxer Protocol required the Qing government to demilitarize Tianjin and the New Army was relocated to Baoding. From 1902 to 1912, the officer academy in Baoding took on a number of different names, including the Beiyang Army Expedited Martial Studies Academy. The academy trained officers for the New Army, which was a significant factor in Yuan Shikai's rise to power at the end of the Qing dynasty and the pivotal role he played in the Xinhai Revolution. In 1912, after Yuan became the provisional president of the Republic of China, the academy was briefly moved to Beijing and became the Army Academy. In October 1912, the academy was relocated back to Baoding and formally became the Baoding Military Academy. The academy closed in 1923 due to the factionalism amongst the warlords.

== Motto ==
The Baoding Military Academy school motto was "Be trustworthy, be punctual, and study diligently. Practice hard, love your school, and be patriotic."

== Notable alumni ==
Baoding military alumni played a large role during the Second Sino-Japanese War, with a large portion of the National Revolutionary Army's Officer Corps being made up of these graduates. Some of these would later have roles in forming the People's Liberation Army.

The following is a list on notable alumni:

- Bai Chongxi
- Cai Tingkai
- Chiang Kai-shek, president of the Republic of China
- Huang Shaohong
- Xia Wei
- Zhang Qun
- Zhang Zhizhong
- Wu Peifu
- Xue Yue
- Chen Cheng
- Li Jishen
- Sun Chuanfang
- Liu Zhi
- Xiong Shihui
- Li Pinxian
- Qin Dechun
- He Jian
- Xu Tingyao
- Luo Zhuoying
- Hao Mengling
- Yu Hanmou
- Han Deqin
- Gu Zhutong
- Shangguan Yunxiang
- Li Hanhun
- Deng Yanda
- Ye Ting
- Tang Shengzhi
- Zhang Jingyao

== Successors ==
- Republic of China Military Academy

== Memorial ==
In 1993, a memorial and museum was built on the site of the academy in Baoding to commemorate the academy and the 11,000 cadets who studied there. In 2006, the memorial became a national-level historical site.
