= Jiaozhuang Township =

Jiaozhuang Township (焦庄乡) may refer to two locations in China:

- Jiaozhuang Township, Hebei, in Nanshi District, Baoding
- Jiaozhuang Township, Henan, in Xiping County
