= Sui County, Henan =

Sui County 睢县
- County
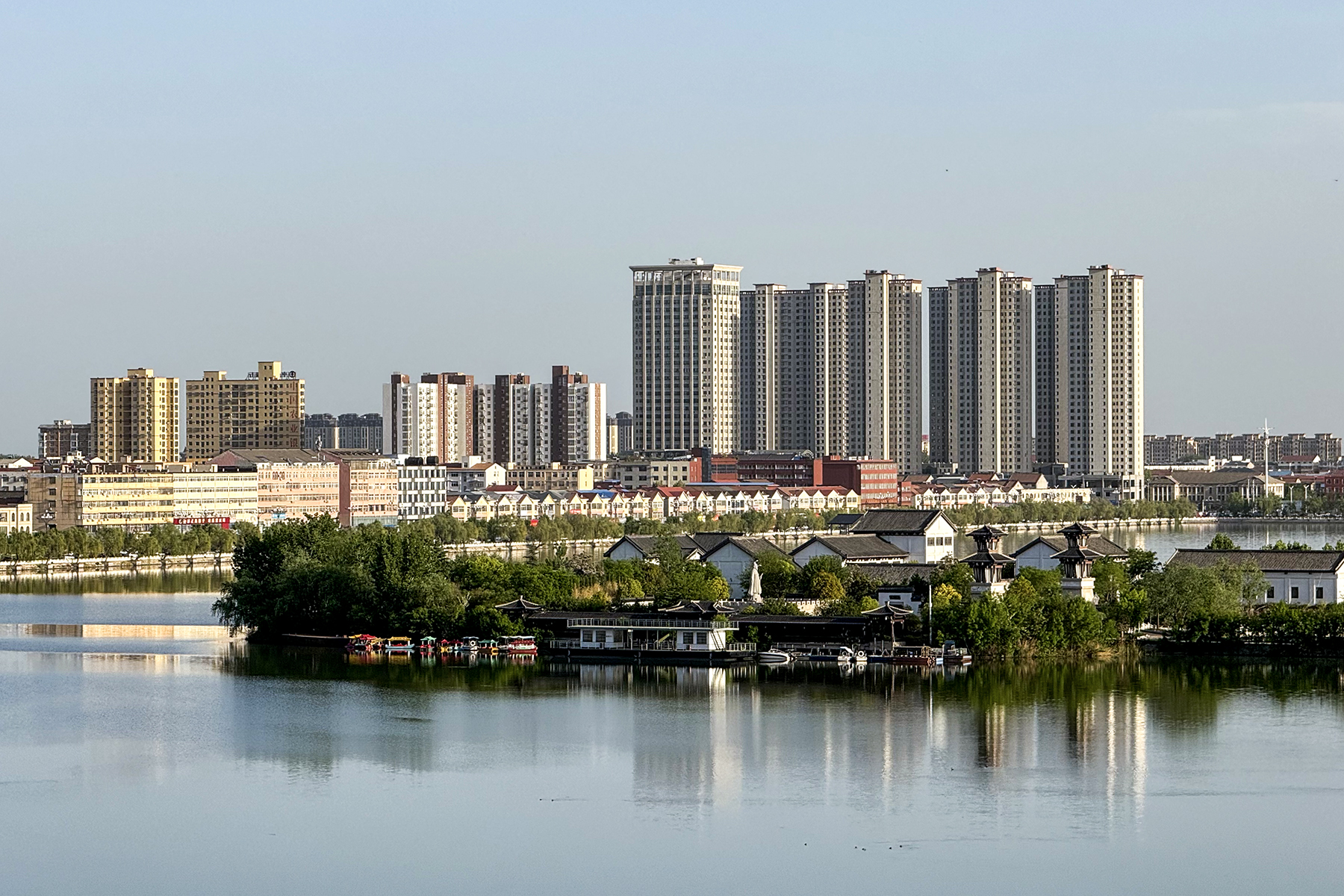
- Fengcheng Lake in Sui County in 2024

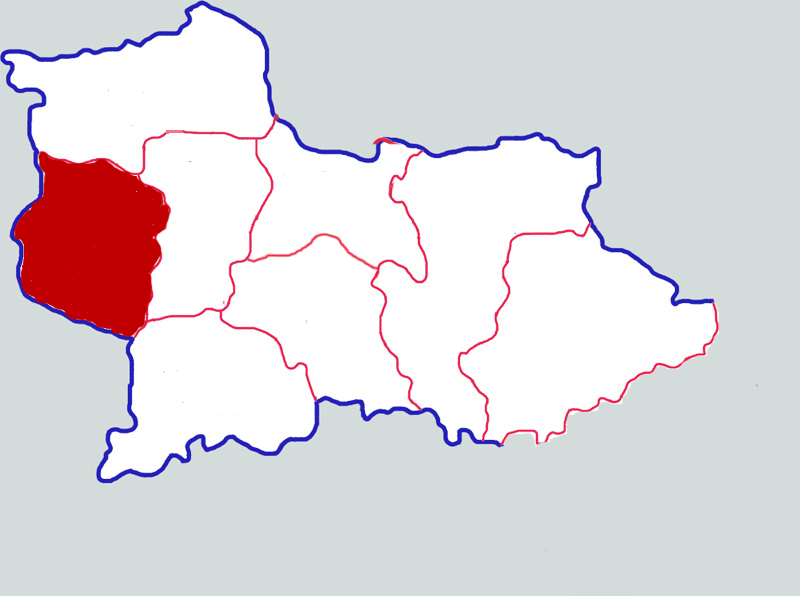
- Location in Shangqiu

- Location of the seat in Henan
- Coordinates: 34°26′49″N 115°04′19″E
- Country: People's Republic of China
- Province: Henan
- Prefecture-level city: Shangqiu

Area
  - Total: 920 km^{2} (360 sq mi)

Population (2019)
  - Total: 668,500
  - Density: 730/km^{2} (1,900/sq mi)
- Time zone: UTC+8 (China Standard)
- Postal code: 476900

Sui County or Suixian (simplified Chinese: 睢县; traditional Chinese: 睢縣; pinyin: Suī Xiàn) is a county under the administration of the prefecture-level city of Shangqiu, in the east of Henan province, People's Republic of China, with a population of about 800,000 as of 2010 and an area of 960 km^{2} (370 sq mi). The county seat is Chengguan Township.

== Administrative divisions ==
As of 2012, this county is divided to 8 towns and 12 townships.

Towns

- Zhoutang (周堂镇)
- Pinggang (平岗镇)
- Chaozhuang (潮庄镇)
- Changgang (长岗镇)
- Liaodi (蓼堤镇)
- Xilingsi (西陵寺镇)
- Shangtun (尚屯镇)
- Chengguan (城关镇)

Townships

- Chengjiao Township (城郊乡)
- Youjitun Township (尤吉屯乡)
- Heji Township (河集乡)
- Hutang Township (胡堂乡)
- Baimiao Township (白庙乡)
- Houtai Township (后台乡)
- Dongdian Township (董店乡)
- Jiangang Township (涧岗乡)
- Kuangcheng Township (匡城乡)
- Bailou Township (白楼乡)
- Sunjuji Township (孙聚寨乡)
- Hedi Township (河堤乡)

== Climate ==
Climate data for Suixian, elevation 56 m (184 ft), (1991–2020 normals, extremes 1981–2010)
| Month | Jan | Feb | Mar | Apr | May | Jun | Jul | Aug | Sep | Oct | Nov | Dec | Year |
|---|---|---|---|---|---|---|---|---|---|---|---|---|---|
| Record high °C (°F) | 17.7 (63.9) | 24.9 (76.8) | 26.9 (80.4) | 32.6 (90.7) | 38.0 (100.4) | 40.1 (104.2) | 38.9 (102.0) | 36.8 (98.2) | 34.9 (94.8) | 34.1 (93.4) | 26.9 (80.4) | 20.4 (68.7) | 40.1 (104.2) |
| Mean daily maximum °C (°F) | 5.3 (41.5) | 9.2 (48.6) | 14.8 (58.6) | 21.0 (69.8) | 26.5 (79.7) | 31.6 (88.9) | 31.8 (89.2) | 30.3 (86.5) | 26.9 (80.4) | 21.8 (71.2) | 13.9 (57.0) | 7.3 (45.1) | 20.0 (68.0) |
| Daily mean °C (°F) | 0.0 (32.0) | 3.4 (38.1) | 8.9 (48.0) | 15.0 (59.0) | 20.5 (68.9) | 25.5 (77.9) | 27.1 (80.8) | 25.6 (78.1) | 21.0 (69.8) | 15.3 (59.5) | 8.0 (46.4) | 2.0 (35.6) | 14.4 (57.8) |
| Mean daily minimum °C (°F) | −3.9 (25.0) | −1.0 (30.2) | 3.7 (38.7) | 9.3 (48.7) | 14.7 (58.5) | 20.0 (68.0) | 23.2 (73.8) | 22.0 (71.6) | 16.5 (61.7) | 10.3 (50.5) | 3.4 (38.1) | −2.0 (28.4) | 9.7 (49.4) |
| Record low °C (°F) | −17.6 (0.3) | −15.1 (4.8) | −8.3 (17.1) | −3.1 (26.4) | 2.5 (36.5) | 10.6 (51.1) | 14.6 (58.3) | 11.5 (52.7) | 5.0 (41.0) | −1.6 (29.1) | −15.5 (4.1) | −15.5 (4.1) | −17.6 (0.3) |
| Average precipitation mm (inches) | 13.1 (0.52) | 16.4 (0.65) | 26.5 (1.04) | 43.4 (1.71) | 63.5 (2.50) | 91.0 (3.58) | 180.8 (7.12) | 172.6 (6.80) | 77.3 (3.04) | 40.1 (1.58) | 31.5 (1.24) | 11.7 (0.46) | 767.9 (30.24) |
| Average precipitation days (≥ 0.1 mm) | 4.2 | 4.5 | 5.4 | 5.7 | 7.4 | 7.4 | 11.1 | 10.5 | 8.0 | 5.8 | 5.5 | 3.7 | 79.2 |
| Average snowy days | 3.7 | 3.1 | 1.1 | 0.1 | 0 | 0 | 0 | 0 | 0 | 0 | 1.0 | 2.2 | 11.2 |
| Average relative humidity (%) | 69 | 67 | 66 | 71 | 72 | 69 | 83 | 86 | 81 | 74 | 73 | 71 | 74 |
| Mean monthly sunshine hours | 124.0 | 136.0 | 177.1 | 206.8 | 221.8 | 201.7 | 187.0 | 181.9 | 164.8 | 162.1 | 139.9 | 130.3 | 2,033.4 |
| Percentage possible sunshine | 39 | 44 | 48 | 53 | 51 | 47 | 43 | 44 | 45 | 47 | 45 | 43 | 46 |
Source: China Meteorological Administration
