= New Army =

Qing dynasty modernised army in response to the first Sino-Japanese war

- 新軍
- Flag of the Qing dynasty
- Active: 1895–1912; 1 July 1917 – 12th July 1917
- Disbanded: 1912; 12 July 1917
- Country: China
- Allegiance: Emperor of China
- Branch: Imperial Qing Army
- Type: Army
- Role: Land warfare
- Size: Corps
- Part of: Military of the Qing dynasty
- Garrison/HQ: Beijing
- March: Soldier's Training Song
- Engagements: Boxer Rebellion; Xinhai Revolution

Commanders
- Notable commanders: Yuan Shikai Yinchang Zhang Zhidong Tieliang
- Nominal commander: Ronglu (Wuwei corps which this army was under) 1895–1903

Insignia
- Flag of China (1889–1912)

The New Army (Traditional Chinese: 新軍, Simplified Chinese: 新军; Pinyin: Xīnjūn, Manchu: Ice cooha), more fully called the Newly Created Army (新建陸軍 Xinjian Lujun (Note: Chinese: 新建陸軍; pinyin: Xīnjiàn Lùjūn; Wade–Giles: Hsin-chien lu-chün) (Note: Also translated as "Newly Established Army" (Chi 1976, p. 13))), was the combined modernised army corps formed under the Qing dynasty in December 1895, following its defeat in the First Sino-Japanese War. At first it consisted of a few experimental units, but after 1901 it was envisioned as a regular and professional army, fully trained and equipped according to Western standards with a reserve. In 1903 an imperial edict expanded it to 36 divisions of 12,500 men each, or total of 450,000 in peacetime supplemented by a further 523,000 reservists in wartime, though it never achieved a strength above 300,000.

== 1895-1897 ==
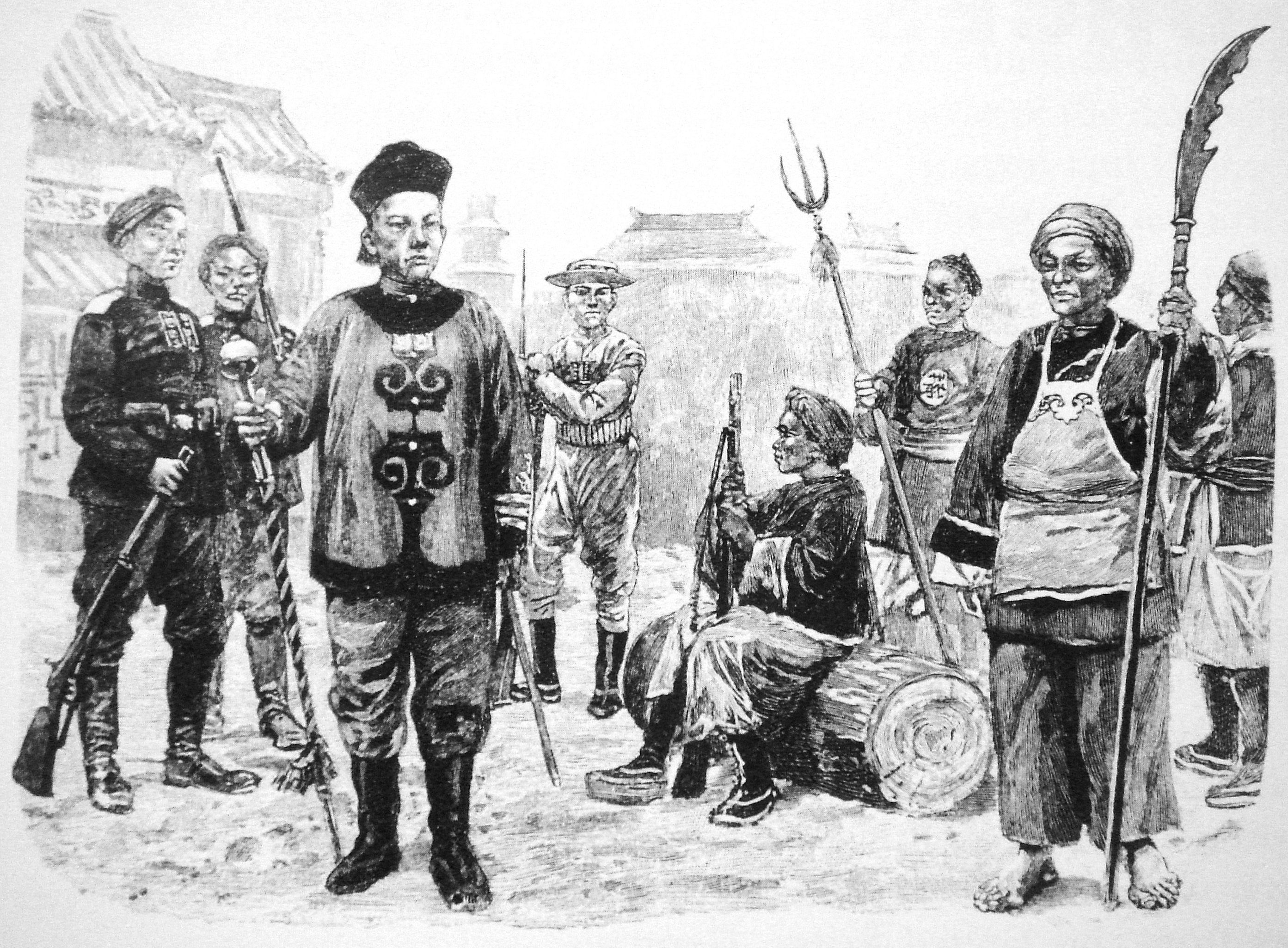
Chinese soldiers in 1899–1901. Left: three infantrymen of the New Imperial Army. Front: drum major of the regular army. Seated on the trunk: field artilleryman. Right: Boxers.

A forerunner to the effort of modernising the Chinese army was created before the end of the Sino-Japanese War: in February 1895, the Qing court assembled its Dingwu or the Pacification Army (定武軍 Dingwu jun), consisting of 10 battalions or ying (営), totaling 4,750 men. This was initially organized by Hu Yufen and aided by German advisor Constantin von Hanneken. However, after one year of training, this force had not yet been trained sufficiently to meet western standards. (Note: As to the man-count figures, "3000 infantrymen, 1000 artillery men, 250 cavalry men, and 500 engineers, a total of 4750 men" is given by Chien-Nung Li, although "more than five thousand men" is given by Wang 1995, pp. 69. If engineers are excluded as non-combatants the figure may round down to 4,000, as given by Chi 1976, p. 13.)

The command of this Pacification Army was turned over to Yuan Shikai by mid-December 1895, (Note: On December 8, 1895, Empress Dowager Cixi passed down the edict) (Note: Yuan was at this time the taotai or intendant of several provinces.) and within a few months was renamed the Newly Created Army (新建陸軍 Xinjian Lujun) and expanded to 7,000 men. (Yuan's Newly Created Army was later to become the Guards Army's Right Division (Wuwei Youjun).)

The monthly expenses of the brigade were 70,000 taels (840,000 taels per year).

The Newly Created Army (or simply the New Army) that was 7,000 men strong then became the most formidable of the three army groups stationed near Beijing and proved effective against the Boxers in Shandong province. Yuan refused to obey the Imperial Court's orders to halt his suppression of the Boxers when the Eight-Nation Alliance invaded China during the rebellion and refused to obey orders to fight the alliance.

The New Army was gradually expanded and upgraded in the following years. Yuan became increasingly disrespectful of the dynasty and only loyal to the party from which he benefited; his defection to Cixi against the Guangxu Emperor was a major blow to the Hundred Days' Reform. After 1900, Yuan's troops were the only militia that the Qing court could rely on amidst revolutionary uprisings throughout China.

Following the disgracing of Li Hongzhang in the First Sino-Japanese War, the Manchu Ronglu was made chief commander of the forces in Zhili and, eventually, Viceroy of Zhili in 1898. He was also minister of war for most of this period.

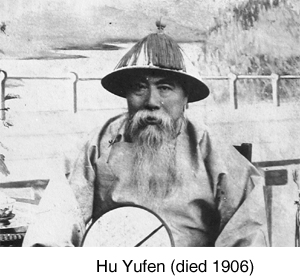
A prominent advocate of military reform

=== General reform ===
During and following the Qing defeats in the First Sino-Japanese War, many officials advocated reform of the military. Hu Yufen, a progressive official, advocated for a completely new army to be trained and raised with 50,000 in the Beiyang region, 30,000 in the Nanyang region, 20,000 each in Guangdong and Hubei, with the other provinces raising 10,000 each for a total of 250,000 troops (Manchuria had not yet been organised into provinces).

Constantin von Hanneken, a German advisor to the Qing military, proposed raising 100,000 men, this recommendation being supported by the Duban Junwu chu, or the "War council assembled during the war". It then memorialised the Grand Council calling for reform; whilst the Manchus of the Council supported the reform, the Han members did not.

In response to von Hanneken's proposal, Sheng Xuanhuai proposed that, due to the expenditure of the Green Standard and the Yong Ying amounting to over 20 million taels each annually, it would be better to disband these forces numbering some 800,000 and replace them with 300,000 western-style troops raised according to local conditions akin to the idea of Hu Yufen. However, the Zongli Yamen retorted that disbanding such a large army would be extremely difficult and came out in favour of a more gradual program of reform with modernisation being extended to the existing forces.

The Throne approved the creation of 2 German-style brigades but, unlike previous reforms, this was not a mere copy of drill and weapons, but a following of German organisation patterns as well as German training and tactics in addition to drill and weaponry of the Self-Strengthening Army of Zhang Zhidong and the Newly Created Army of Yuan Shikai.

=== Eight Banners ===
Despite the criticism of the old-style and inefficient Green Standard Army and Eight Banners, which was common, there were no immediate proposals for reform of them, which the Manchus still closely guarded, by the Han officials.

In late 1895, Yinchang was ordered to choose and instruct Manchu officers at the Tianjin Military Academy in anticipation of their taking command.

=== Military education ===
In 1896, Zhang Zhidong declared in a memorial to the Throne that the reason for German military pre-eminence was the universal education of its officer corps and asked for a military academy and railway school to be established in Nanjing. This was approved, and Zhang organised the training of 150 Chinese cadets under German instruction on a 3-year course involving techniques, strategy, infantry tactics, artillery engineers of both fortress and field artillery, surveying, and cartography. The railway school enrolled 90 students. Zhang already possessed the relevant experience for educating officers via academies, having introduced a similar program for education of officers in Liangguang during the Self-Strengthening Movement. The Nanjing Military academy costed 40,000 taels per year, not including the attached railway school.

=== Newly created army and Yuan Shikai ===
Yuan was appointed as commander of the brigade in December 1895 and immediately began reform of the unit. The infantry was divided into 2 regiments with 2-3 battalions each, the artillery into 2 regiments with 2-3 battalions each with a QF, heavy and reserve component, the cavalry into 4 troops and the engineers into 6 groups based on their tasks. The 7,000 man upper strength limit was rapidly achieved by the unit. A German language school was established and 3 foreign officers instructed the cavalry, artillery and infantry, the upper organisation and staff components of the unit were also westernised as was the maintenance of telegraph communications and the introduction of night fighting something previously avoided by Chinese armies. To combat corruption, Yuan instituted a new system where officers personally handed their funds to the soldiers under their command from Yuan's own HQ under his personal supervision. Yuan, like Zhang, was one of the few Chinese officials who not only paid his troops well, but actually paid them on time.

=== Pace of reform ===
The incompetence of the officers and the technical deficiencies of the military were routinely attacked by imperial censors and the Throne ordered the Board of War to deliberate on the matter of modernisation of the officer corps, something not rectified until several years later with the abolition of the military examination.

The pace of reform and its extent was diluted and slowed by the corruption, favouritism, and general negligence in the bureaucracy, and the Throne often issued edicts to demand the bureaucrats fire the old, incompetent, and weak and report them to the Board of Punishment, but the bureaucrats rarely did this, instead shielding one another especially at higher levels. This did not create an environment conducive for reform.

Only minor increases in the number of modernised troops were made in the period from 1897 to the Boxer rebellion. Whilst the support for reform was almost universal, even amongst the Tartar-Generals, the actual extent of reform was minimal. The Tartar-General of Heilongjiang even praised the ability of his forces in fighting bandits and their lack of reform whilst simultaneously admitting they would be useless in true combat. Additionally, spears and bows were still commonplace, and the Heilongjiang general complained that it was too expensive to equip his entire force with rifles and instead asked for permission to make breech loaded jingals, a weapon lower in cost.

=== Other armies ===
General Nie Shicheng took 30 battalions of the Yong Ying and organised them into a 15,000-strong force based on German organisational patterns and established a military school where 2 Germans taught language and technical subjects. However, Nie's army, whilst better than other Chinese armies, did not approach that of Yuan's or Zhang's.

=== Finances ===
The estimates for the revenue of the central government range from 87,979,000 taels to 92,285,000, with roughly half the amount (45 million taels) going to the military including all forms of expenditure naval and land. The local armies, navies, and fortresses were estimated to cost 27,000,000 taels, with 10,000,000 for the Beiyang and Nanyang fleets and 8,000,000 for the forts and their guns. The Board of War and Board of Revenue jointly reported the cost of the militia, Defense Army, disciplined forces, and new-style troops to cost over 20,000,000 taels. The only accurate figures are that of expenditure on the arsenals at 3,385,000 taels, the Green standard, including the Disciplined forces (the modernised Green standard), were reportedly costing 10,000,000 taels annually, and the Bannermen 4,000,000 taels and 1,000,000 piculs of rice (60,000,000 kg). The reason for the number of the breakdown exceeding the total is due to the significant overlapping between units, the provinces' practice of subsidising other provinces, and the central government also subsidising them whilst some provinces both provided and received subsidies. For example, in 1894, Zhejiang provided not only for its own military, but also that of the Manchu and Chinese in Beijing, the Beiyang Fleet, and the cost of re-organisation in Manchuria.

== 1898-1900 ==
=== Hundred Days' Reform ===
The Hundred Days' Reform initiated by the Guangxu Emperor also affected military affairs, as the Emperor desired a comprehensive reform of the state. The Throne complained of the lack of reform enacted in the provinces, especially the continued corruption and military bloat caused by padded muster-rolls and the failure to disband the Green Standard Army. Within the same edict, the Throne called for new local militia and volunteer units to be raised and to replace the Green Standard; this was the same approach used 30 years earlier by Zeng Guofan, and, whilst it might have brought about a temporary boost to military power, it would inevitably devolve back into corruption and stagnation as the Yong Ying had done. However, the Throne did pass an edict on the recommendation of Hu Yufen to abolish the military exam, which was agreed to be phased out by 1900; the 10,000 strong Peking Field Force left to languish since 1865 was to be given a refresher course in western-style training. However, when the experienced and more politically able Prince Gong (who avoided raising the ire of the conservatives) died, the pace of reform accelerated even further. Weng Tonghe, the Emperor's former tutor and a conservative (the last such advisor to the Emperor), was dismissed, leaving the Grand Council entirely in the hands of the reformers. However, the Emperor maintained Ronglu, a conservative, as the Viceroy of Zhili, a mistake which he would regret and his position on the Board of War was given to the conservative K'ang-i. The Emperor even discussed the possibility of ordering the bannermen, who were a drain on the state treasury, to enter a different occupation and not live solely on the state stipend given to them. The Throne also ordered the provinces to disband the useless soldiers, and the provinces raised their opposition. Some counter-proposed the reduction of militia and Green Standard troops or stated that they had reduced their military forces to the extent that any further downsizing would constitute a danger. Ultimately, little military reform was enacted by the Guangxu Emperor during the brief period of reform.

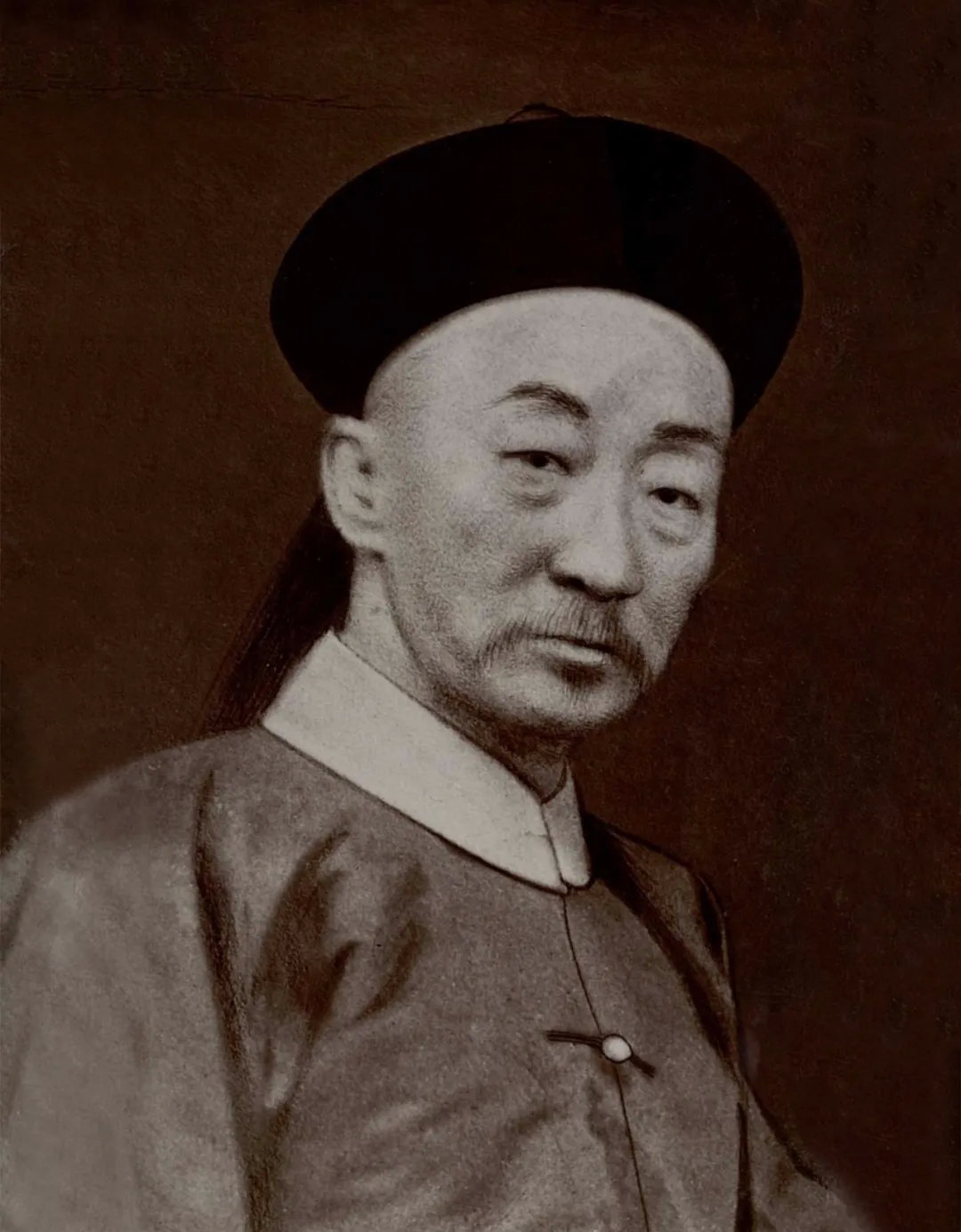
Ronglu, a prominent Manchu military official and nominal commander of the Wuwei Corps

A proposal for universal military training was proposed and approved by the Emperor in the largest departure from the traditional organisation of the military, with all men in a given region being given military training and then act as a national reserve force for the military. The proposal was enacted with the most fervour in Southeastern China, particularly Guangxi and Guangdong, where the strength of the reformers was the most apparent. However, the Throne still did not take the lead even in this reform program, instead delegating the program to the Viceroys and Governors who had in the previous decades failed to deliver, thus it was likely for this program to end in failure too. The Emperor also decreed the adoption of modern drill, and they were to possess true discipline and modern weapons, with traditional weapons to be discarded. The Emperor took the Empress Dowager Cixi to inspect new army units, but this did not prevent the Coup against the Emperor.

=== Cixi's reforms ===
Cixi, following the coup, began improving her control over the military, namely by maintaining the decentralised command of the military so as to deny any one official too much military power whilst simultaneously increasing the forces under her command and those under the control of the Manchus. She continued the adoption of western drill and the importation of weaponry, but the necessary support services for a modern army remained neglected. Cixi continued and re-issued the edicts regarding the disbandment of old units. However, they continued to exist alongside the newer modern western-style units leading to a large cost, which hindered further reform as the finances of the state could not simultaneously support a large modern army and a very large unmodernised army. Cixi, however, did maintain the loyalty of the troops, something the Guangxu Emperor failed to achieve, as she generously gave the troops of Yuan, Dong, and Nie money for their support against the Guangxu emperor and his reformers.

Ronglu, a Manchu, was given unprecedented military power, being appointed simultaneously as Grand Councillor, Controller of the Board of War, and Imperial Commissioner over the forces of Song Qing, Yuan Shikai, Nie Shicheng and Dong Fuxiang, thus centralising all forces around the capital under a loyalist Manchu official. The commander of the forces in the Beiyang region (the area around the Bohai Bay), the new Manchu Viceroy, was to assist him. Cixi did not extend such centralisation to the other provinces, but did continue the universal military service program, ordering officials to encourage such organisations and to hire ex-bandits and criminals and give them a legitimate career in the military, which was not conducive to an effective military but cheaper than fighting the bandits. Cixi re-instated the military exam on the path to abolishment by order of Guangxu, adding a category on firearms in addition to archery and swordsmanship. She did also turn down a request to abolish technical subjects in the provincial colleges and modern schools.

K'ang-i, the President of the Board of War, was sent on an inspection tour of 1899 to improve the defenses of Liangguang and to raise money. In the aspect of finances, he was successful, being given the sobriquet "imperial high extortioner" by the foreign press.

==== Wuwei Corps ====
Ronglu proposed to the Throne that the Wuwei Corps be formed from 4 divisions (later expanded to 5 with the additional Centre division). The Throne agreed, and the Corps was formed the 5 Divisions, being: the Centre under Ronglu; the Front of Nie Shicheng, trained by Germans then Russians, armed with Mauser rifles, artillery, and Maxim guns but poorly disciplined; the Left of Song Qing, which possessed similar arms to the Front division; the Rear of Dong Fuxiang, poorly equipped and armed, but potentially useful; and the Right of Yuan Shikai. Of the 5 divisions, Yuan's was regarded as the best force among them all. Cixi further ordered the training of 12,000 Anhui army soldiers and 19,000 Disciplined Army soldiers for an additional 31,000.

Wuwei Corps
Divisional Name	Paper Strength	Actual Strength	Location
Centre	10,000	considerably less	Nanyuan
Front	13,000	13,000	Lutai
Left	20,000	10,000	...
Rear	10,000	10,000	...
Right	10,000	10,000	...

The 5 divisions were to have 8 ying (battalions): 5 of infantry, and 1 each of cavalry, artillery, and engineers. Each division was to also have a training battalion attached with each battalion, having 4 companies of 250 (old-style formations had their Ying at 500 nominally, in practice around 300). Again the aims were not met, and only the Centre and Right divisions actually conformed to the new organisation. Ronglu also obtained large amounts of funds, some 400,000 taels, from the Hubu for his force of 10,000 (on paper). Simultaneously, the Banner army, which was at least 200,000 and potentially up to 350,000 strong, had less than 5 million taels. Many officers were transferred from across the Empire to this army at Ronglu's request.

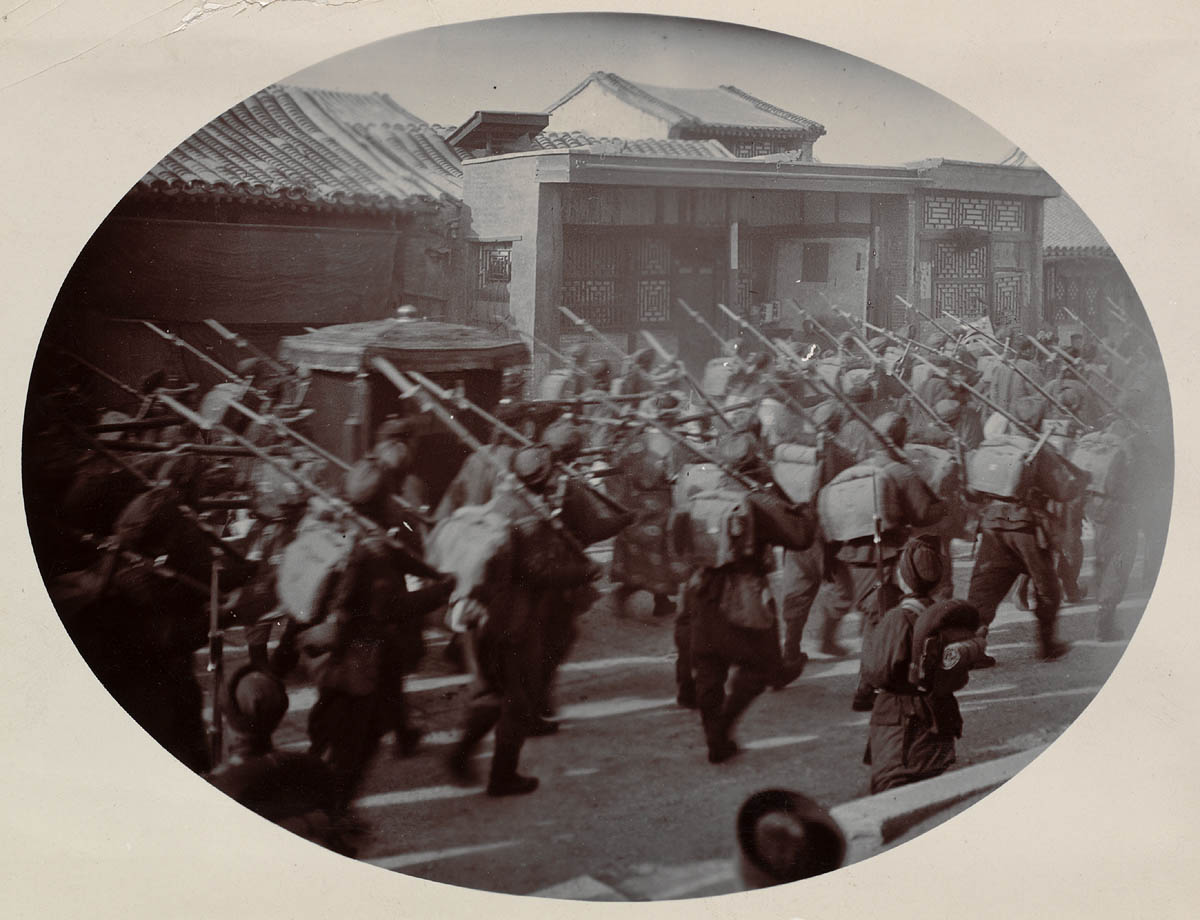
Troops of the Wuwei Corps escorting Dowager Empress Cixi.

==== Arms importation 1895-1900 ====
The Qing government recognised the weakness of its domestic armaments industry and sought foreign imports to bridge the gap. In 1899, the Imperial Army ordered 460,000 Mauser rifles and 3,000,000 cartridges, and, by 1900, the Qing had imported some 207 machine guns, 71 fortress guns and 123 field guns with another 200 Krupp mountain guns being ordered.

== 1901-1903 ==
=== Command and education ===
Zhang Zhidong and Liu Kunyi jointly proposed the formation of an Imperial General Staff, modelled on the Japanese equivalent, and that the chief of the General Staff be a competent professional soldier, not just a noble or imperial clansmen. This could have centralised military forces and allowed for a standardisation of training, pay, and equipment and become an engine of reform. However, the Throne did not approve it until 1909. The two officials did get the Throne to abolish the military exam in 1901, replacing it with direct application to provincial armies by the 2nd and 3rd rank and to await enrollment in military schools in the expectation of their establishment. To obtain a steady and large flow of trained officers, an edict mandated all provinces to open military academies and those with academies (Yuan, Zhang and Liu) were to create a national regulation regarding military education. In 1902, even bannermen were obligated to attend the military schools, though the Imperial Guardsmen were still tested in their proficiency with the bow.

=== Organisational reform ===
The throne also ordered once again to demobilise the Green Standard and militia to a more efficient force by discharging the useless. The remaining forces were then to be organised into a standing army (Changbei jun), a first reserve (Xubei jun), and a gendarmerie (Xunjing jun). Standing army units were to gradually proliferate across the Empire and to then later form the new army (Lujun) the reserves served as a safe haven for the old-style units allowing them to continue existing despite repeated orders to disband them. In 1902 the Throne informed the provinces once again of their intent to demobilise the greater portion of the Green Standard and that land formerly allotted to the maintenance of soldiers in substitution of pay would devolve back to the Throne. The reform edicts were not followed and the Throne complained in 1902 that the Manchu-Generals, Viceroys and Governors were dragging their heels.

The increasing uselessness of the Bannermen spurred the Throne into action. As military power increasingly became Han Chinese, the Throne sought to balance this by ordering Yuan Shikai to train 3,000 Bannermen with plans later arising for an additional 3,000 to be trained. Ronglu also was rumoured to have begun the training of 30,000 bannermen in 1901, but his death ended this before it began.

The Throne also ordered that the Green Standard and Braves be reduced by 20-30% in within a year. Given the lack of reliable figures, this would amount to 200,000-400,000 men being dismissed by the army, a large decrease equivalent to the entire standing armies of other countries. Given these troops were of little real military value, this represented a great cost saving measure.

=== Beiyang army ===
As commander of the army, Yuan Shikai was ordered to form 2 divisions, one of which was to consist of Manchus rather than Han Chinese. Yuan trained the one Manchu division and prepared a corps of 4 divisions, 3 of which were Han Chinese. The 2 initial divisions were to form a Corps of 19,120 men organised into 42 battalions with a total annual cost of 2,387,600 taels excluding the costs of armament. Yuan Shikai hired Japanese instructors and advisors, establishing many schools offering diverse subjects such as topography and ballistics. He also sent his cadets to study in Japan.

=== Hubei army ===
Zhang had organised a bodyguard of 7,750 modernized soldiers organised into 1 brigade of 11 battalions, 8 infantry and 1 battalion of cavalry, artillery and engineers each. However, Captain Gadoffre reported that there were 14,750 foreign-trained men whilst Zhang reported 9,500 to the throne. In Hubei, there were 15,700 modernized troops including 7,000 Bannermen and 42,000 soldiers described as "armed coolies". Zhang had also standardised the armament of his forces using the Hanyang Arsenal and arms imported from Germany. According to Gadoffre's report, the modern units were proficient in drill and on the parade ground, but the control over units broke down in sustained exercises and manoeuvres; artillery was generally underutilised and marksmanship was mediocre. Zhang began to transfer the modern officers from his bodyguard to the provincial forces only for these officers to neglect their learned foreign principles and revert to old methods, spurring the formation of military schools for commissioned and non-commissioned officers.

=== Other provincial reforms ===
Liu Kunyi, Viceroy of Liangjiang, controlled the vital lower Yangtze region and began to organise new military forces. Liu used the Defense Army (Yong Ying) to organise 2 standing army units while the remaining 40 battalions were to be re-organised as first-class reserves. However, Liu maintained the old-style organisation in his bodyguard, his troops were ill-trained and ill-equipped, and trained officers were not given admittance to the formation. Liu also organised military schools similar to Zhang Zhidong's but used Chinese graduates from these schools to train his men rather than having them trained directly by foreigners. All officers under the rank of Lt. Col were ordered to partake in lectures on military science.

In other provinces, modernisation was limited to the German goosestep and issuing men repeating rifles, though men were organised into standing army and first-class reserves across the empire, though not universally. This change was often just in name, and the new organisation was not followed.

== 1904-1907 ==
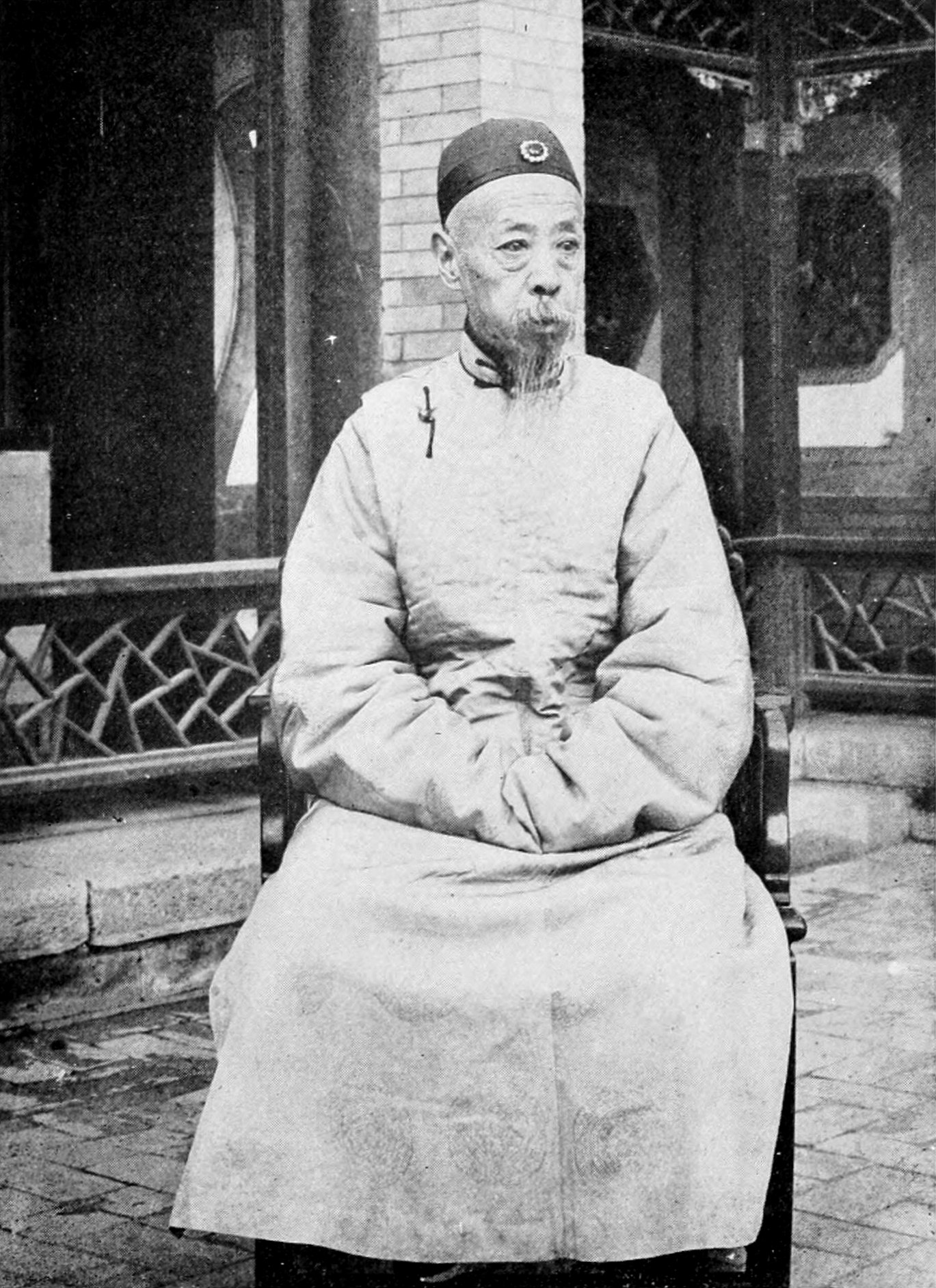
Prince Qing director of the commission for army reorganisation.

The previous reforms were deemed insufficient, and in the face of the Russo-Japanese war the Throne acted much more decisively by forming the Commission for Army Reorganisation. The fact that while reform had been called for little of substance had been achieved made it necessary for the Throne to centralise reform efforts and their implementation. Prince Qing was named the director of these reforms with Yuan Shikai and Tieh'liang as assistant directors.

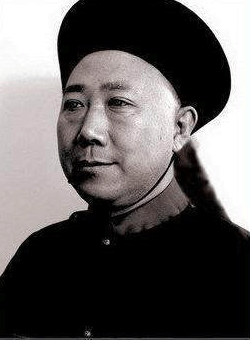
Tieliang, assistant director of the army commission and prominent military reformer.

=== Organisation ===
==== Lujun ====
A division of the Changbei Jun was to consist of 2 infantry brigades, a cavalry and artillery regiment, an engineer transport battalion and a band. Each brigade was to possess 2 regiments which themselves contained 3 battalions. With 4 companies per battalion and at most 3 platoons per company, strength organisation varied. A mixed brigade possessed 2 infantry regiments, an artillery and cavalry battalion, and an engineer and transport company. An infantry division was to possess (excluding officers) 12,500 men while a brigade possessed 3,024, a regiment 1,512, battalions 504, companies 168 and platoons 42 men. A cavalry regiment was to possess 864 men including officers. Artillery regiments were to possess 3 battalions with 3 batteries each, each battery possessing 141 men including officers and operating 6 guns. This made for a total of 54 guns and 1,269 men.

An alternate table of organisation is given for the division:

The division contains 2 infantry brigades each with 2 regiments and each with 3 battalions. One regiment of artillery with 54 guns and 18 machine guns is present, as well as one regiment of cavalry of 12 squadrons, 1 engineer battalion of 4 companies, one logistics battalion of 4 companies, 51 musicians and an unspecified amount of gendarmerie. This yields 12,512 men in peacetime and 21,000 in wartime.

An infantry battalion in peacetime contained 659 men and when mobilised 1,240, while a company was composed of 154 men in peacetime and 299 in wartime. A cavalry squadron had 81 men. An artillery regiment had 1,136 men, while an engineer battalion contained 667 men in peacetime and 1,250 when mobilised, and a logistics company 748 men in peacetime with 1,640 when mobilised.

Thus, a division when fully mobilised would include 14,880 riflemen, 54 guns and 18 machine guns with 1,136 gunners, 1,250 engineers, 1,640 logistics personnel, 972 cavalry and 51 musicians giving a total manpower of 19,927 with the balance likely constituting divisional level officers and the attached gendarme.

A division of the Xubei jun was to contain the same organisation, but its regiments had 2 battalions rather than 3, yielding a total strength of 9,840 men. The Houbei jun only fielded a brigade of 4 battalions containing 2,016 men total, numbered with its parent division.

==== Xunfangdui ====
The reserve troops consisted of the former Luying (Green Standard troops) and Braves (Yong Ying), which were re-designated as reserve troops in 1907. The reserve troops were to serve as a militarised police in peacetime and auxiliary troops in times of war. Each province was limited to maintain at most 50 battalions of infantry or cavalry. An infantry battalion consisted of 301 men and a cavalry battalion of 189 men and 135 horses. Thus, a province fielding solely infantry battalions would field 15,050 men (331,100 nationally), and likewise solely cavalry would field 9,450 (207,900).

==== Gendarmerie ====
The gendarmerie functioned as the military police of the empire. One battalion was organised in 1908 to consist of 299 men and 82 horses.

=== Proposal by Sir Robert Hart ===
Robert Hart, the Inspector-General of the Imperial Maritime Customs Service, reasoned that the Qing folly in allowing Russia and Japan to wage war in Manchuria was due to fiscal weakness. He therefore proposed a uniform land tax at a low rate which would yield 400,000,000 taels to be used by the central government. This money would firstly be used to form 4 armies of 50,000 each, with each army supported by first and second class reserves. Then, 3 modern squadrons of warships could be obtained, and the establishment of 4 modern arsenals could be organised to produce equipment and 4 military schools to produce officers. The military would cost 90,000,000 taels, and 160,000,000 taels would be spent on affording good pay to reduce the need for officials to rely on corruption to support themselves. The proposal was rejected due to provincial opposition, though the proposal was not as revolutionary as similar proposals previously made by the Throne and officials themselves which were not acted upon.

=== Report of the Imperial Army Commission ===
The report called for the implementation of a Western and Japanese-style army system in China and the maintenance of a middle path between over and underspending respectively. The general purpose was standardisation and modernisation of all areas of the army from organisation and pay to training and equipment. The basic system of provincially managed armies that could be mobilised in wartime was maintained, but with new formations and the support of a centralised logistical system. Thus, the recruitment, training and finances of the new troops were managed by the provinces, but the overall command was invested at the higher echelons of government. The commission detailed the various weaknesses of the military and ways to rectify them with the notable exception of the Eight Banners. Each province was ordered to assemble a provincial staff and a brigade of new army troops.

Recommendations of the commission:

- A specialised, educated officers corps for staff and line officers with academy trained officers given priority and higher pay to cover their actual cost of living and to clamp down on corruption.
- A more vigorous system of inspections.
- The issuance of a detailed regulations book detailing the responsibilities of officers, their duties and how control the units effectively. The reliance on drill instructors was to be phased out when academy officers were made available.
- Strict recruiting standards requiring 20% to be literate to potentially become NCOs. Only troops aged 20–25 of a height of 5 ft 6.5 inches in Northern China and 5 ft 4 inches in Southern China capable of lifting 133 lbs in good health and not addicted to opium were to be recruited.
- A pension system in the event of death or disability as well as one for ex-servicemen, encouraging an esprit de corps.
- Implementation of an adequate logistical and medical service from first-aid to military hospitals, and a logistics chain capable of operating from interior depots directly to fighting units.
- Equipment standardisation was also highlighted, with the most modern yet simple and durable weapons to be used by the army. Uniforms were standardised with black for the winter and khaki for the summer, though the commission's goal of standardisation in 5 years was overly optimistic.
- The Army (Lu-jun) was to be divided into 3 categories: the standing army (Changbei jun), the 1st class reserves (Xubei jun) and the 2nd class reserves (Houbei jun). Service in the Changbei jun was to be for 3 years with a monthly pay of 4.2 taels, while the Xubei jun had a service term of 3 years with drill at allotted times with pay of 1 tael a month when not actively serving. The Houbei jun had a service term of 4 years with less allotted training with a monthly pay of half a tael except when actively serving.
- Organisation was to be standardised for a division to contain 12,512 men (748 officers, 10,436 NCOs and enlisted, and 1,328 support). A corps was to possess 1,595 officers and 23,760 enlisted men with an allotted 4,469 horses and 108 pieces of artillery.
- Standardised naming was implemented. Dajun referred to an army; jun to a corps, zhen to a division; biao to a regiment; ying to a battalion (or cavalry squadron); dui to a company, troop or battery; and pai to a platoon.
- It was estimated by the commission that a single division would cost 1,300,000 taels and a corps 2,778,222.76 taels excluding weapons, equipment and barracks costs.
- 36 divisions were to be formed by 1922 with a total strength of approximately 450,000 men and a cost of 48,000,000 taels. This was later amended to 1913.

==== Military schools ====
The Commission and the Throne in turn accepted the fact that this new army would require a trained and educated officers corps in order to prove worthwhile and effective. Therefore, they jointly ordered the establishment of primary military schools in each province, 4 intermediate schools, an officer's school and a General Staff College. Following this, there were plans for the establishment of technical and specialist schools. However, NCOs were also targeted for education through the establishment of NCO schools the training of battalions formed with the express purpose of producing NCOs. To prevent the senior officers from holding back junior officers and maintaining old military thought, senior officers were to also receive modern military instruction at the provincial capitals.

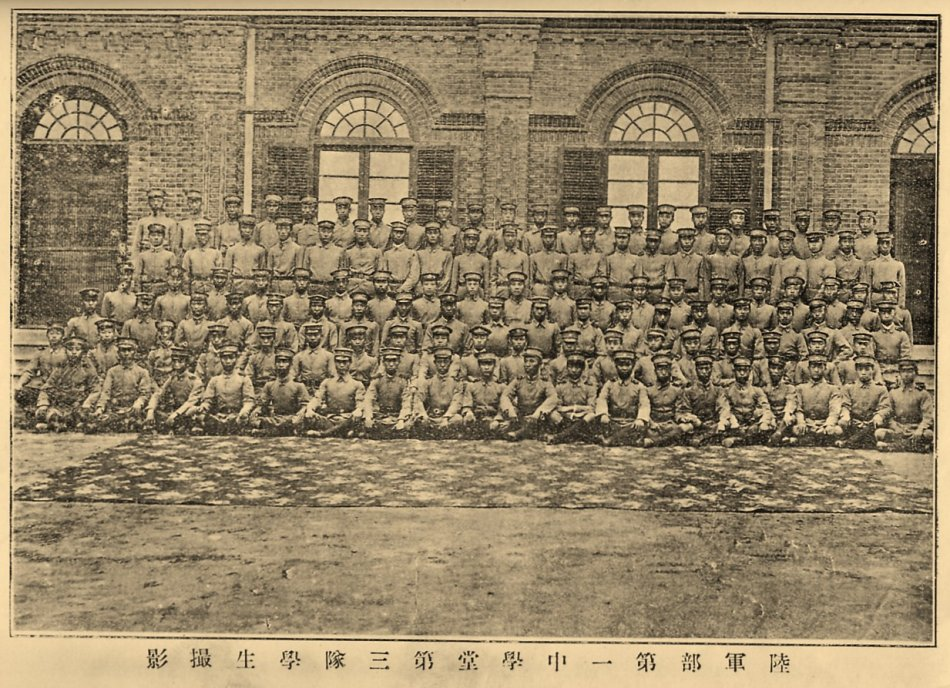
A cohort of junior cadets of the Qing military school system.

The process to become an officer began aged 15 with enrollment in the primary/junior primary schools in each province, with the bannermen and the capital hosting one of these schools enrolling from 90 to 300 students each. Enrollment as a cadet for 3 years in the basic military school followed to obtain general knowledge and learn fundamentals of the military sciences. Students would then attend an intermediate school for 2 years (in Jiangsu, Shaanxi, Hubei and Zhili) which would include a civilian and military curriculum. The cadets would then be obligated to serve 4 months in the ranks, then spend 18 months in the officer's school at Baoding which had a total enrollment of 1,140 officers, then 6 additional months in the ranks before receiving their commission provided they graduated the course. If the now commissioned officers performed 2 years of exceptional service, they would then attend the General Staff College course, which had a total enrollment of 40, for 2 years and become General Staff Corps Officers. This model of military education was similar to that used in contemporary Japan and would have produced educated, competent officers steadily within a decade.

===== Military school for Princes and Nobles =====
This military school offered officer training for 5 years (later reduced to 3) to 120 students. Only certain privileged persons were allowed to attend, including the sons of nobles, clansmen above the 4th rank, Metropolitan and provincial Manchu and Chinese military officials of the second rank and higher aged 18–25, and civil officials of the 2nd rank and higher aged 18–25. Those who passed with the highest grades were immediately commissioned as lieutenants.

New Army Rankings and their equivalent
New Army Rank	Modern US	Chinese Civilian	Unit commanded
Da jiangjun	Field Marshal	Grand Secretary	
Zheng dutong	Lieutenant General	Zongdu (Viceroy)	Jun (corps)
Fu dutong	Major/Lieutenant General*	Xunfu (governor)	Zhen (division)
Xie dutong	Brigadier General	Bu Zhengshi (Lieutenant-governor)	Xie (Brigade)
Zheng canling	Colonel	An Zhashi (Provincial Judicial Commissioner)	Piao (Regiment)
Fu canling	Lieutenant Colonel	Yan Yunshi (Salt controller)	none (deputy regimental commander)
Above ranks awarded by imperial decree			
Xie canling	Major/captain	Taotai (intendant)	Ying (battalion)
Zheng junxiao	Captain/First Lieutenant	Zhi Lizhou (first-class sub-prefect)	Dui (company)
Fu junxiao	First/second Lieutenant	Tong Pan (second-class sub-prefect)	pai (platoon)
Xie junxiao	Second/Sub Lieutenant	Xianzhang (assistant magistrate)/ Zhixian (magistrate)	company adjutant

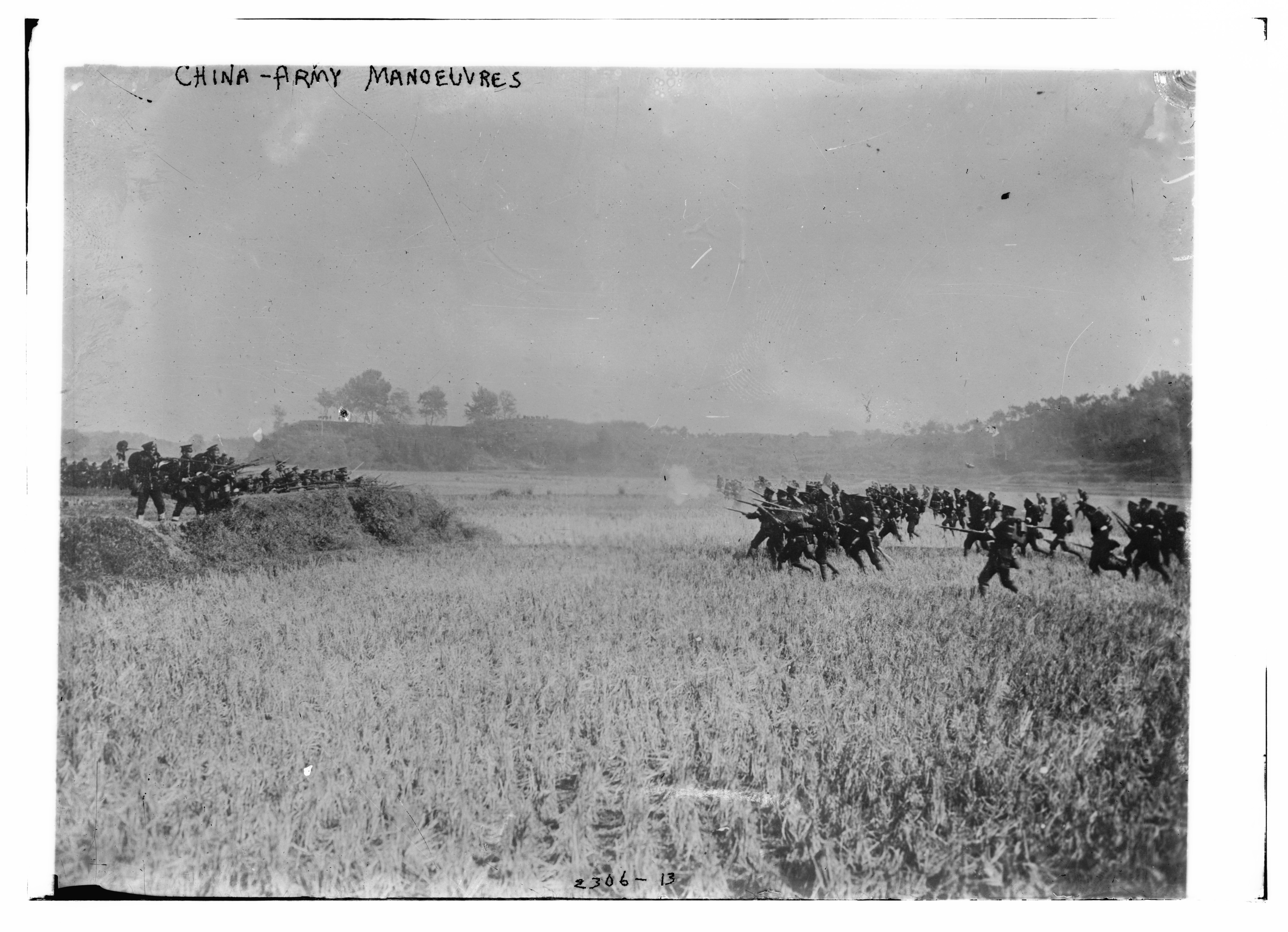
The New Army practicing assault tactics, a field of warfare Qing armies were traditionally viewed as deficient in.

*where alternates are given the former is given by Powell the latter by Brunnert.

=== Implementation of reform ===
==== Zhili ====
The reforms listed above were the theoretical basis and implementation of reform, though in reality differed greatly when put into practice. In 1904-1905, Yuan Shikai attempted to raise 10,000 men (roughly a division) but was blocked by the Board of Revenue as the figure of 3,000,000 taels required was seen as too heavy a burden. However, Yuan remained pursuant to the plan and began the training of large numbers of officers in his military schools. In light of the Russo-Japanese War, Yuan consolidated the disparate forces in Zhili, forming 3 divisions of Chinese and a brigade of bannermen which was to be increased with additional battalions. Yuan's troops attracted praise, being compared to US troops in accuracy and of being well-armed with modern Mauser rifles. Yuan held divisional level manoeuvres in late 1904 with 2 divisions, and with the Manchu brigade a total of 13,100 men were fielded, a key indicator in the quality of troops. This led to 2 additional divisions being raised in 1905 for a total of 5 divisions alongside the Manchu brigade. In late 1905, Yuan shifted his troops from the Beiyang organisational structure to the Lujun organisation as per the imperial military regulations.

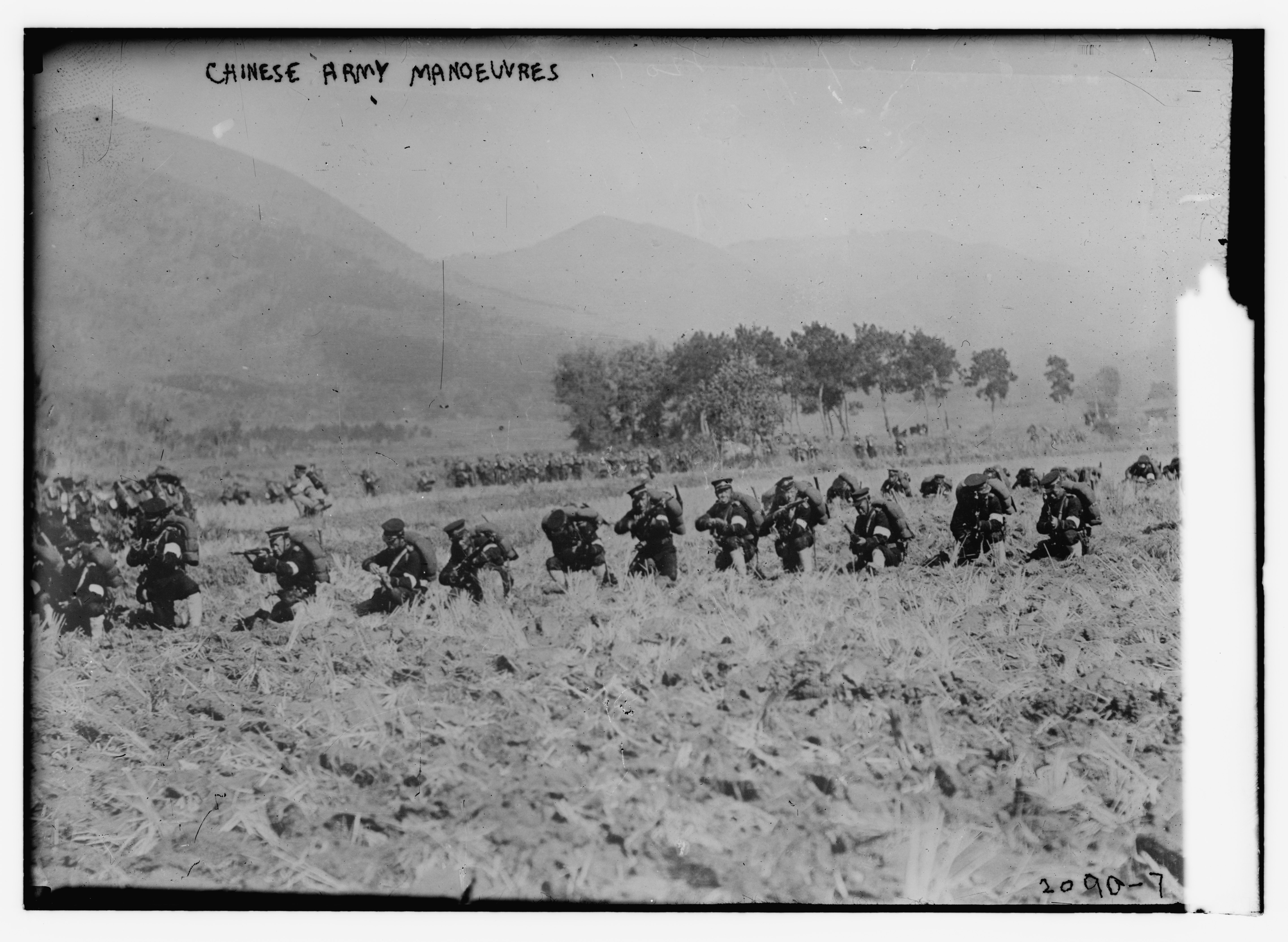
The New Army participating in manoeuvres.

===== 1905 manoeuvres =====
In 1905, the 6 divisions or elements of them all participated in corps level manoeuvres and war games with each corps opposing another. Though exact figures of participants varied from 23,600 to 50,000, per the official regulations there were to be 50,710 men present. In the manoeuvres, praise was forthcoming from the press, but the military observers were less impressed. Issues were still common, particularly among the senior officers who lacked strategic and tactical thought while the junior officers performed better despite the majority of the NCOs still not being trained at all. However, the common soldier received the most praise for being well-drilled and more like a respectable soldier rather than the armed and uniformed bandit of the past. This led to a growing respect for the military amongst the populace at large, with even senior officials like Yuan Shikai and Tieh-liang, the respective corps commanders in the manoeuvres, appearing in corps commander attire as opposed to civilian clothing. The infantry was well praised; the artillery officers were criticised, as was the cavalry, which was regarded as being better utilised as mounted infantry than anything else. The engineers, due to a lack of training, were not utilised besides some bridge building. The use of some telegraph and telephone lines was also noted, as was the utilisation of the Beijing-Hankou railway to move 2 divisions, a major step forward considering a major weakness of the Qing military was its inability to mobilise troops quickly during wartime. Thus, in a few years Yuan had shown considerable progress fielding 2 Western-style corps with modern equipment and moderate ability with a large potential for growth.

==== Hubei ====
Zhang Zhidong had raised 11,500 new-style troops by 1904, but these did not conform to the regulations of organisation dictated to him. Instead, he raised only 2 regiments of infantry and smaller support units divided into 2 brigades. Though these troops were a mix of trained men and raw recruits, they still remained far superior to all other troops in the Yangtze River Valley. Zhang, noting the strategic position of Huguang, stated that he should have 3 or 4 divisions, but this was beyond his financial capacity and instead proposed raising 1 division and 1 mixed brigade of reduced strength before an eventual expansion to 2 full divisions when funding became possible. Zhang, taking into account the numerous hills and waterways of Huguang, aimed to reduce non-combatants, especially logistical troops, and replace field guns with mountain guns. This would reduce his division to 12,071 and his brigades to 5,180 men each, a reduction of several hundred men which would be over 300,000 taels cheaper. This was approved by the throne and Zhang was allowed to form his smaller division and mixed brigade. The division was ready by April 1906 and the mixed brigade by the end of the year. There were also an additional 18,000 soldiers in Hubei not including police forces or militia, a reminder of the main issue facing the Qing: insufficient funding due to the number of outdated troops needed to keep the peace, thereby halting the formation of modernised units needed to protect the country.

==== Other provinces ====
In Jiangsu, the 7th Division remained understrength at only brigade strength (~5000 men). The 9th Division at Nanjing was only 3 infantry regiments (~4500) while the 10th Division in Fuzhou contained 6 infantry battalions, 1 artillery battalions and 2 engineer companies (~5,400). The 25th Brigade in Hunan was almost identical to the 10th Division (~5,400). The 27th Brigade in Jiangsu sported 2 infantry regiments and an understrength cavalry squadron (~4,000), while the 29th Brigade at Kaifeng contained a mix of troops and on paper was at full-strength (~3,000). The 31st Brigade in Anhui contained only 2,000 infantry. Other formations were authorised but did not exist, though there existed the 4,400-strong Canton Brigade and 6,400 men of the Guards who were considered modern troops in their own right.

=== Officer class ===
By 1906 the military had 35 schools with a total enrollment of 787 officers, 3,448 officer cadets, and 2,072 NCOs with an additional 691 training in Japan and 15 in Europe. Given naval officers were also instructed in land warfare, 350 midshipmen could potentially also be added to the enrollment. The Baoding Academy offered veterinary schooling with Hubei and Zhili offering all specialised training and Baoding, Chengdu and Guangzhou offering medical training. A general training course included Chinese history and literature, a foreign language (usually German or Japanese and occasionally English), math, the sciences, geography, general history and military science. The instructors were usually Japanese, Japanese-instructed Chinese and Germans (though these were noted as being undesirable in Germany and thus their contracts were rarely renewed). Even so, Zhili, Anhui and Hubei produced the best officers despite remaining inferior to those trained in Japan on paper. Many officers were still civil officials, elderly officers without training, Green Standard army officers simply shifted in, unqualified naval officers, and civilian students returned from abroad.

== Renaming and revolution ==
In the hunting-park, three miles to the south of Peking, is quartered the Sixth Division, which supplies the Guards for the Imperial Palace, consisting of a battalion of infantry and a squadron of cavalry. With this Division Yuan Shi Kai retains twenty-six modified Krupp guns, which are the best of his artillery arm, and excel any guns possessed by the foreign legations in Peking.

The Manchu Division moves with the Court, and is the pride of the modern army.

By his strategic disposition Yuan Shi Kai completely controls all the approaches to the capital, and holds a force which he may utilize either to protect the Court from threatened attack or to crush the Emperor should he himself desire to assume Imperial power. Contrary to treaty stipulations made at the settlement of the Boxer trouble, the Chinese have been permitted to build a great tower over the Chien Men, or central southern gate, which commands the foreign legations and governs the Forbidden City. In the threatening condition of Chinese affairs it might be assumed that this structure had been undermined by the foreign community, but this has not been done, and if trouble again arise in Peking the fate of the legations will depend upon the success of the first assault which will be necessary to take it. The foreign legations are as much in the power of Yuan Shi Kai's troops in 1907 as they were at the mercy of the Chinese rabble in 1900.

The ultimate purpose of the equipped and disciplined troops is locked in the breast of the Viceroy of Chihli. Yuan Shi Kai's yamen in Tientsin is connected by telegraph and telephone with the Imperial palaces and with the various barracks of his troops. In a field a couple of hundred yards away is the long pole of a wireless telegraph station, from which he can send the message that any day may set all China ablaze.

— To-morrow in the East, Douglas Story, pp. 224-226

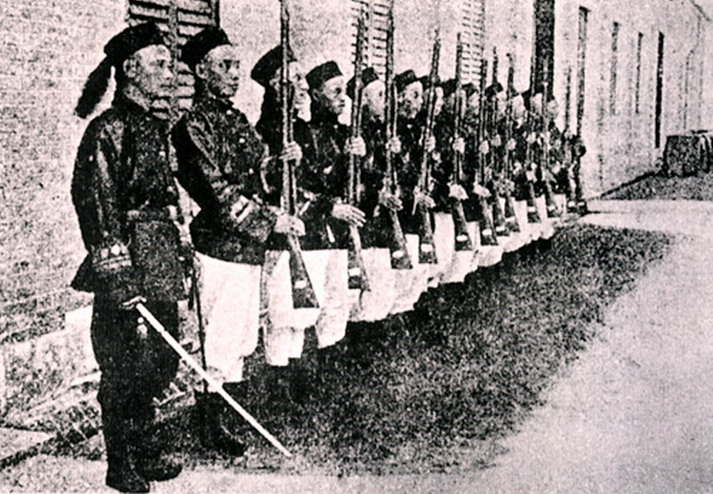
Pacification Army (定武軍 Dingwu jun) in 1895.

The Chien Men gate refers to the Zhengyangmen.

The successful example of the new army was followed in other provinces. The New Army of Yuan was renamed the Beiyang Army on June 25, 1902, after Yuan was officially promoted to the "Minister of Beiyang". By the end of the dynasty in 1911, most provinces had established sizable new armies; however, Yuan's army was still most powerful, comprising six groups and numbering more than 75,000 men. The Qing unified all of China's armies into one force, the "Chinese Army", which was commonly still called the New Army. Two-thirds of the Chinese Army was Yuan's Beiyang Army.

During the Xinhai Revolution, most of the non-Beiyang forces as well as some Beiyang units in the Chinese Army revolted against the Qing. Yuan led the Beiyang Army into opposing the revolution while also negotiating for the Qing's surrender and his ascendency to the presidency of the new republic.

== Politics and modernisation ==
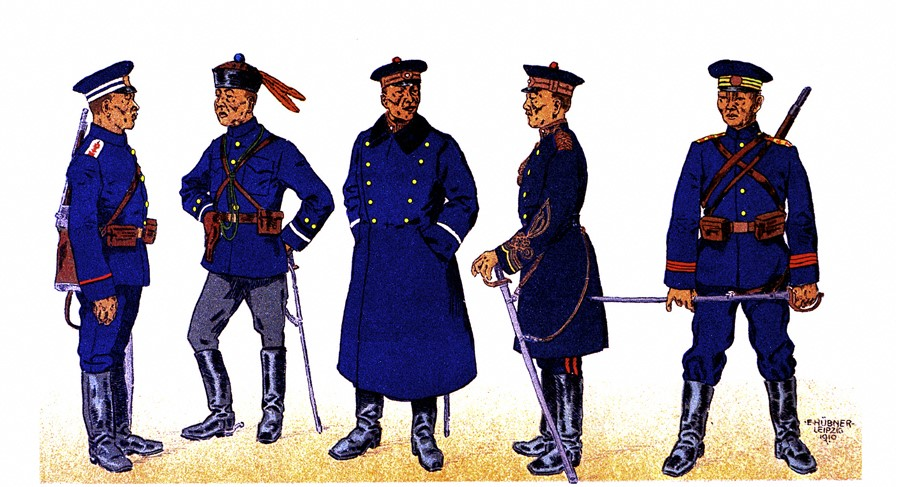
Uniforms of the New Army, 1910.

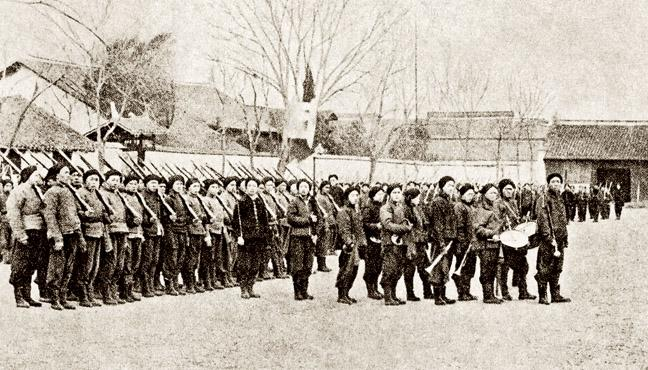
Hubei New Army honour guards and military band

Yuan kept a tight grip on the command of the army after its establishment by installing officials only loyal to him; however, after his death in 1916, the army groups were quickly fragmented into four major forces of combative warlords, according to the locations of garrisons. These army groups and generals played different roles in the politics of the Republic of China until the establishment of the People's Republic of China following the Chinese Communist Party's victory in the Chinese Civil War.

One of the most important legacies of the New Army was the professionalisation of the military and perhaps introduction of militarism to China. Previously, almost any male could join and soldiers were mostly poor, landless and illiterate peasants. The New Armies moved beyond the personalised recruitment and patronage of Zeng Guofan and Zuo Zongtang, which had been successful in the mid-century uprisings, but seemed discredited in the face of modern armies in Japan and the West. The New Army began screening volunteers and created modern military academies to train officers. The modernisation and professionalisation of the New Army impressed many in the gentry class to join. The young Chiang Kai-shek, for instance, briefly attended Yuan's Baoding Military Academy, which thus influenced him in forming his Whampoa Academy, which trained a succeeding generation of soldiers. Yuan and his successors equated military dominance of the political sphere with national survival. The political army would become a dominant force in China for much of the twentieth century.

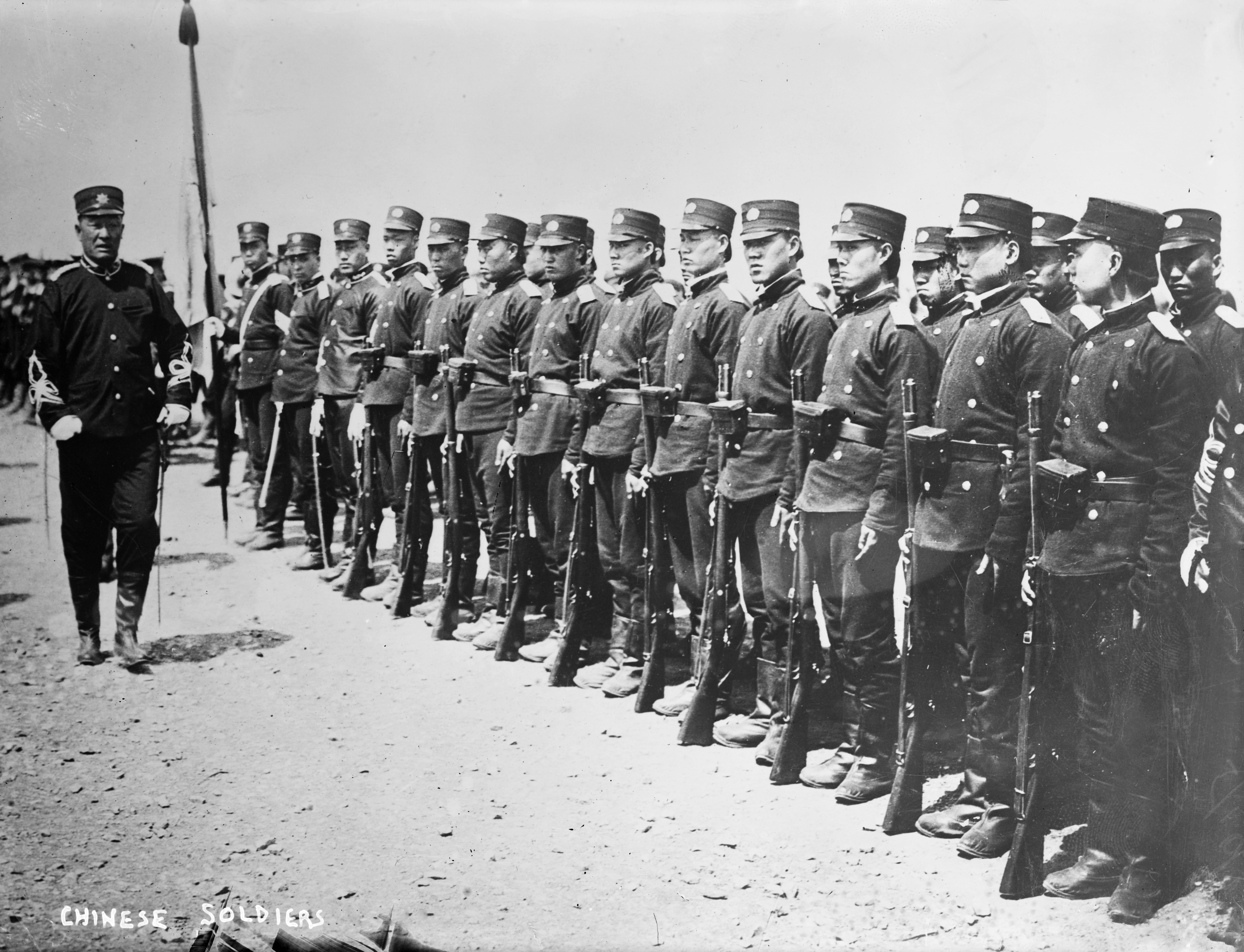
Qing soldiers of a New Army unit in 1905.

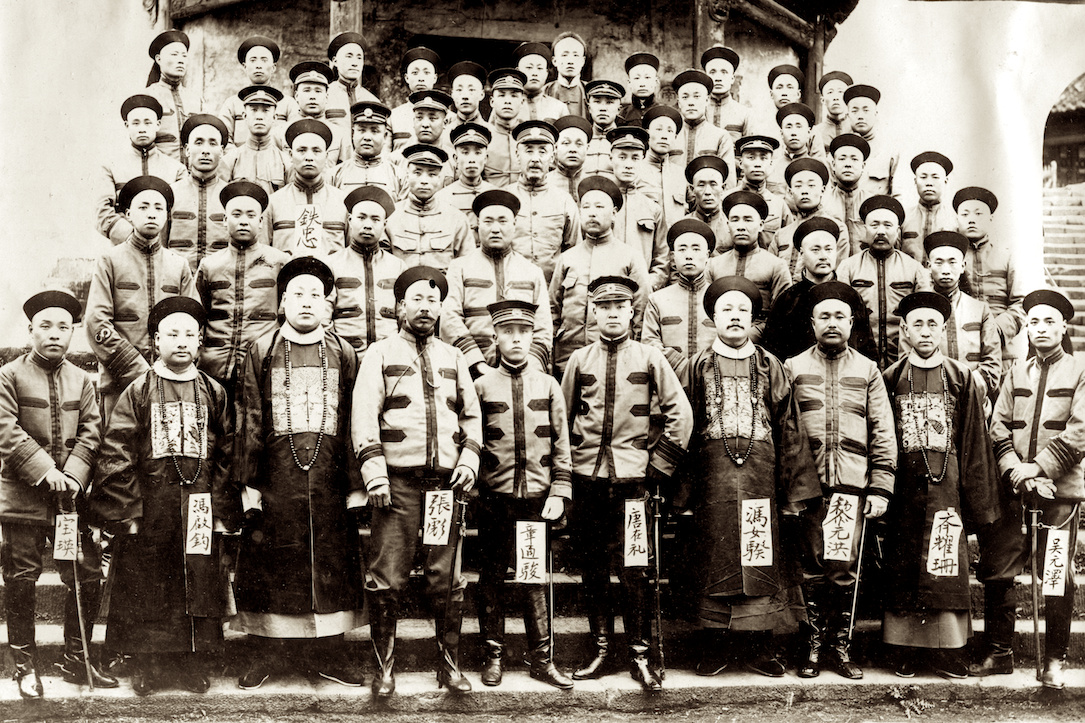
New Army constables in Wuchang in 1906

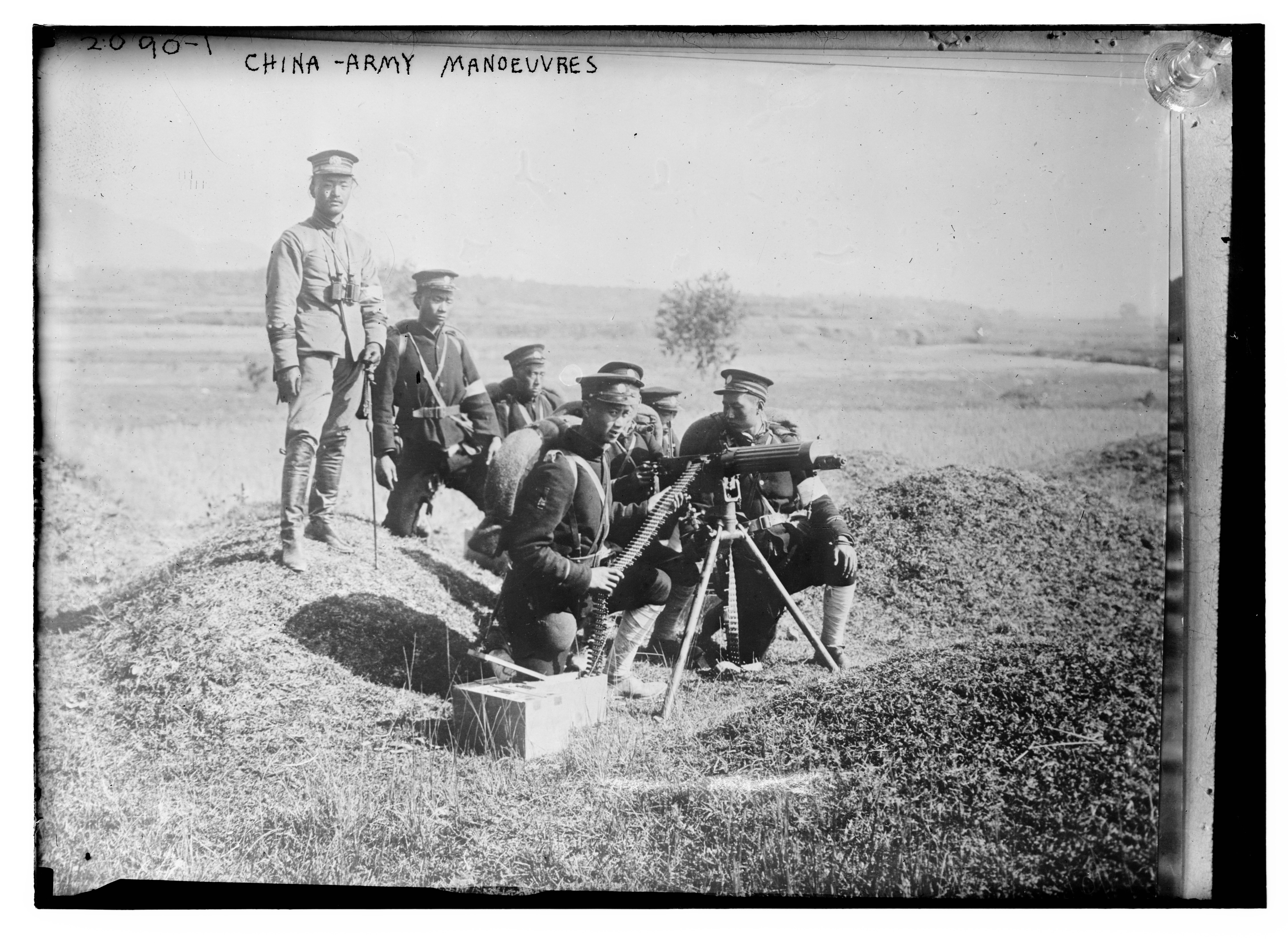
Qing New Army manoeuvres

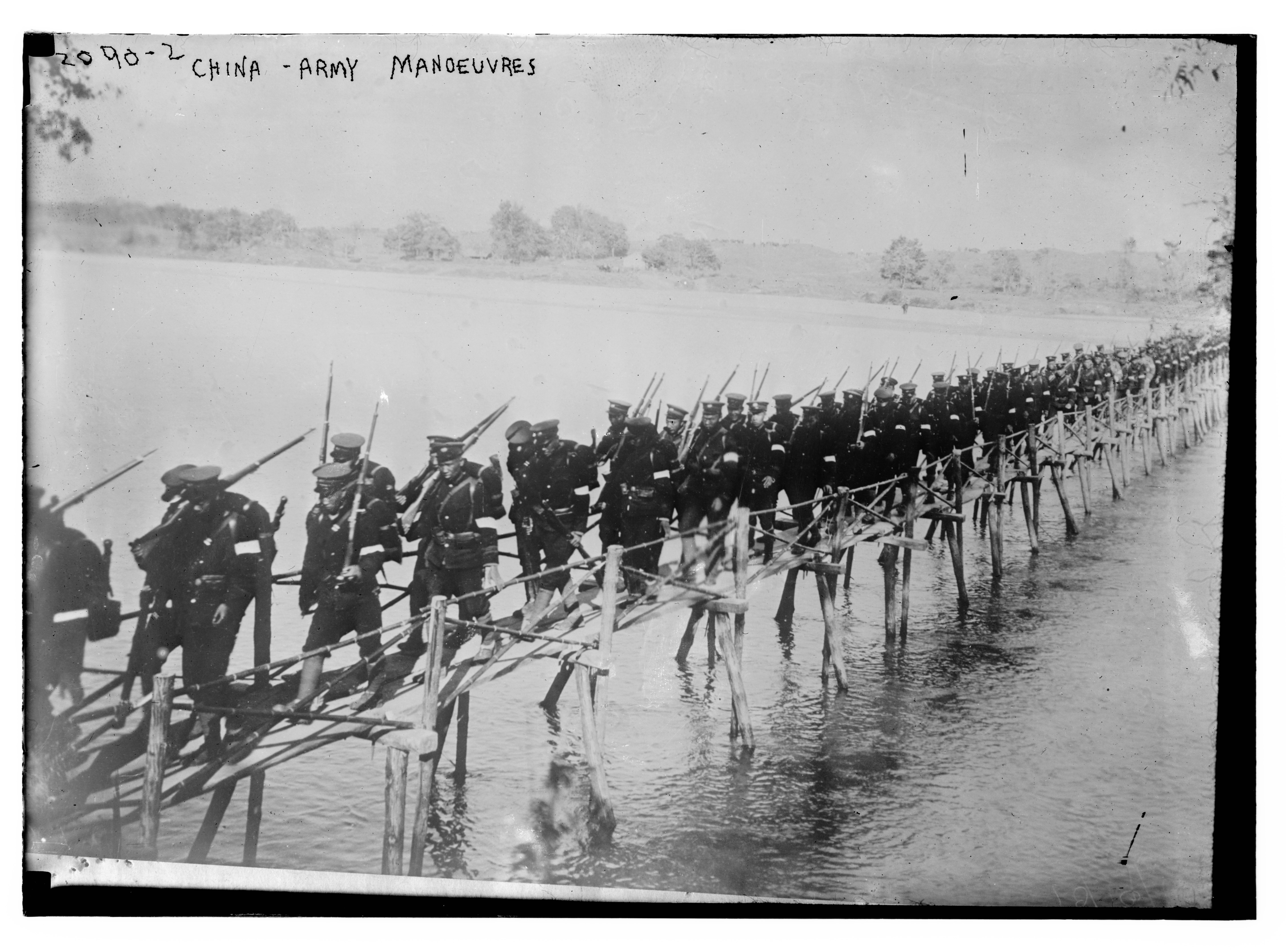
Qing New Army manoeuvres

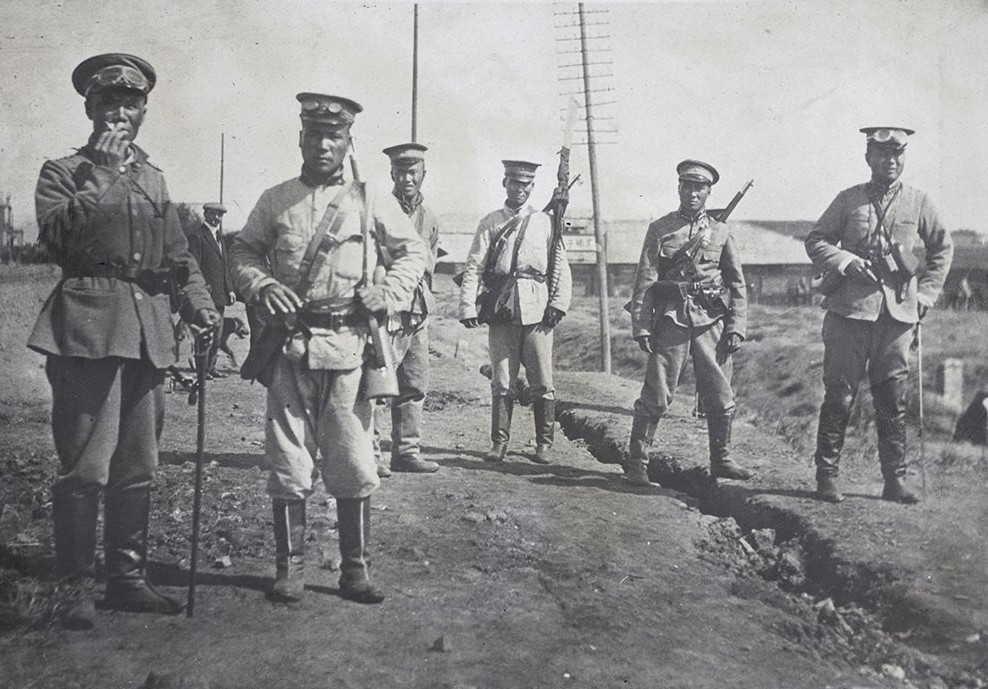
Qing New Army in 1911

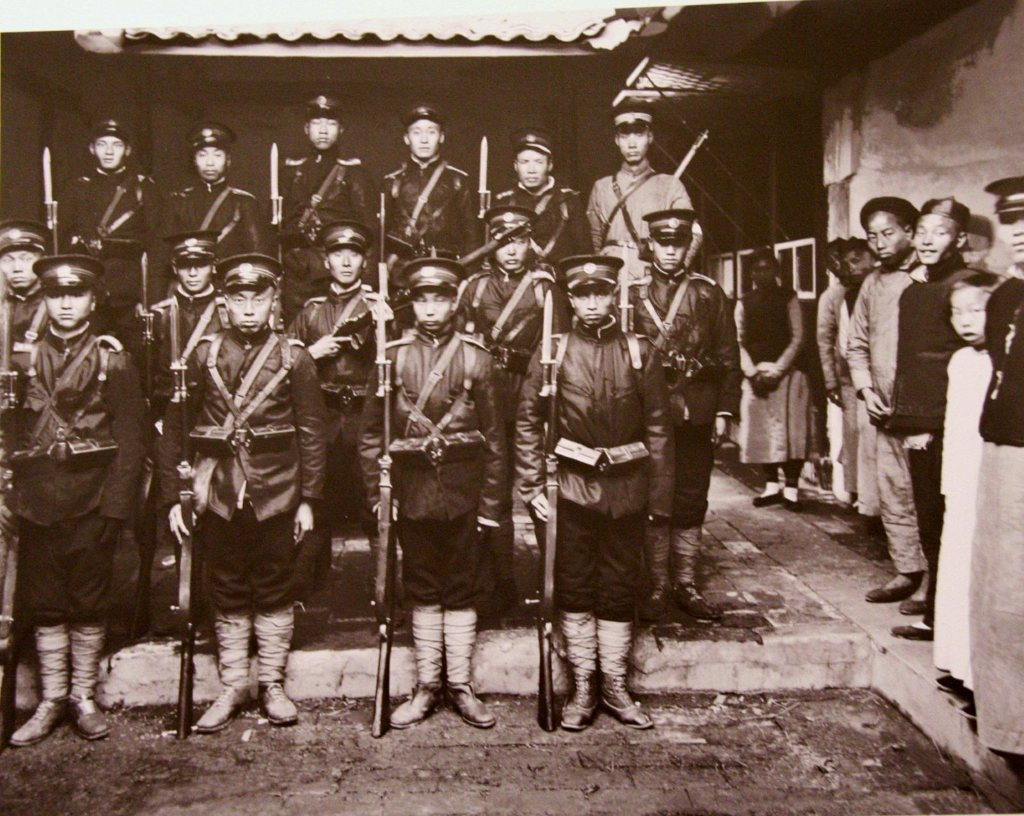
Qing New Army in Chengdu in 1911

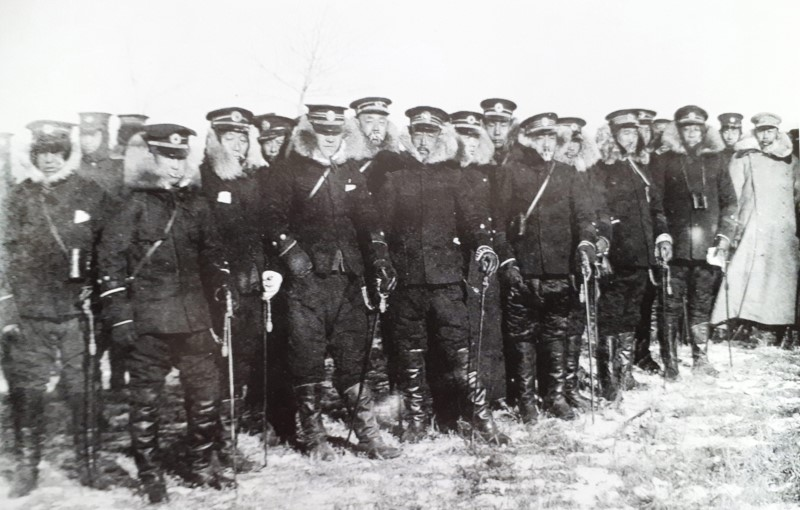
Qing constables training

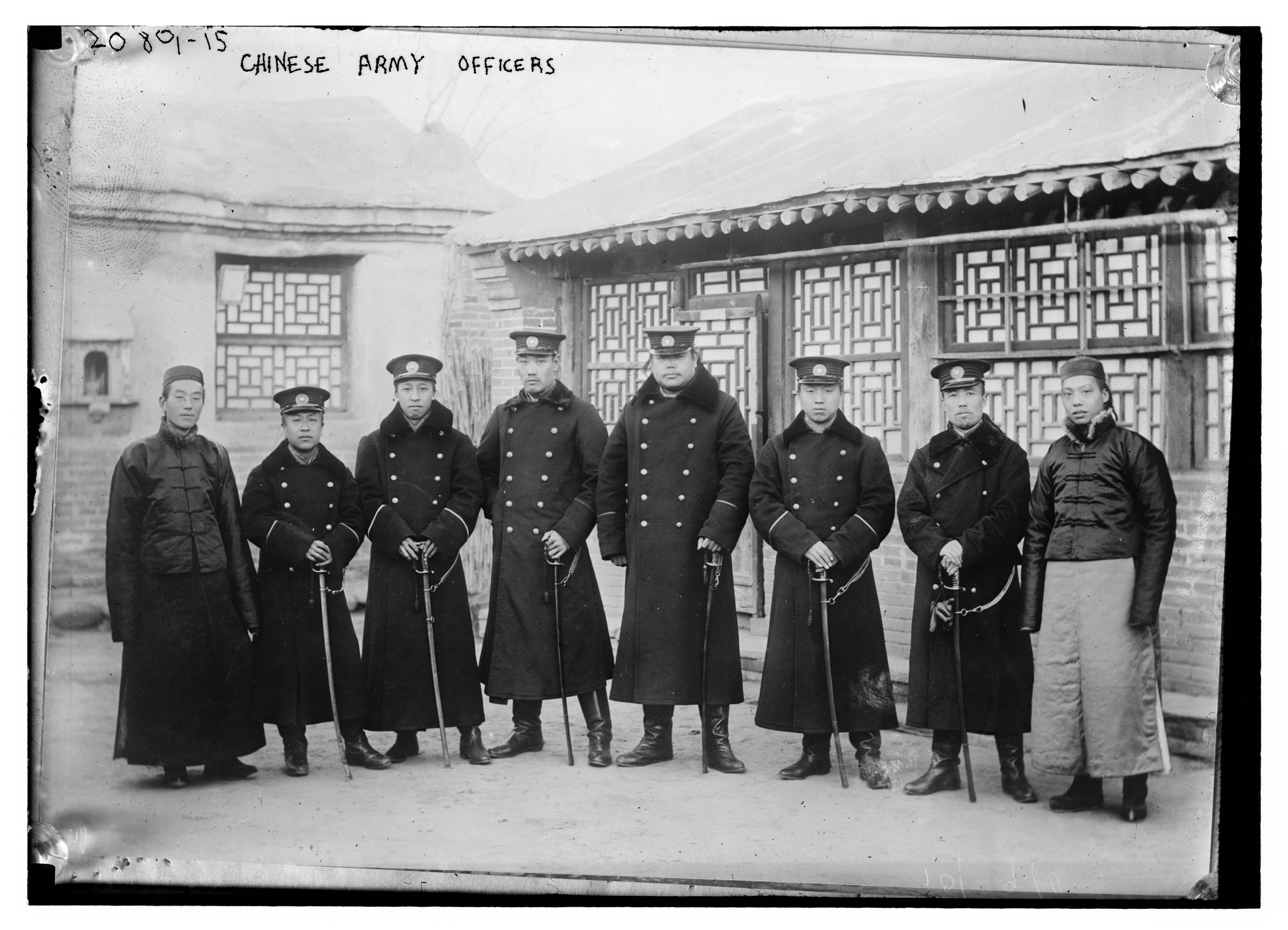
New Army constables

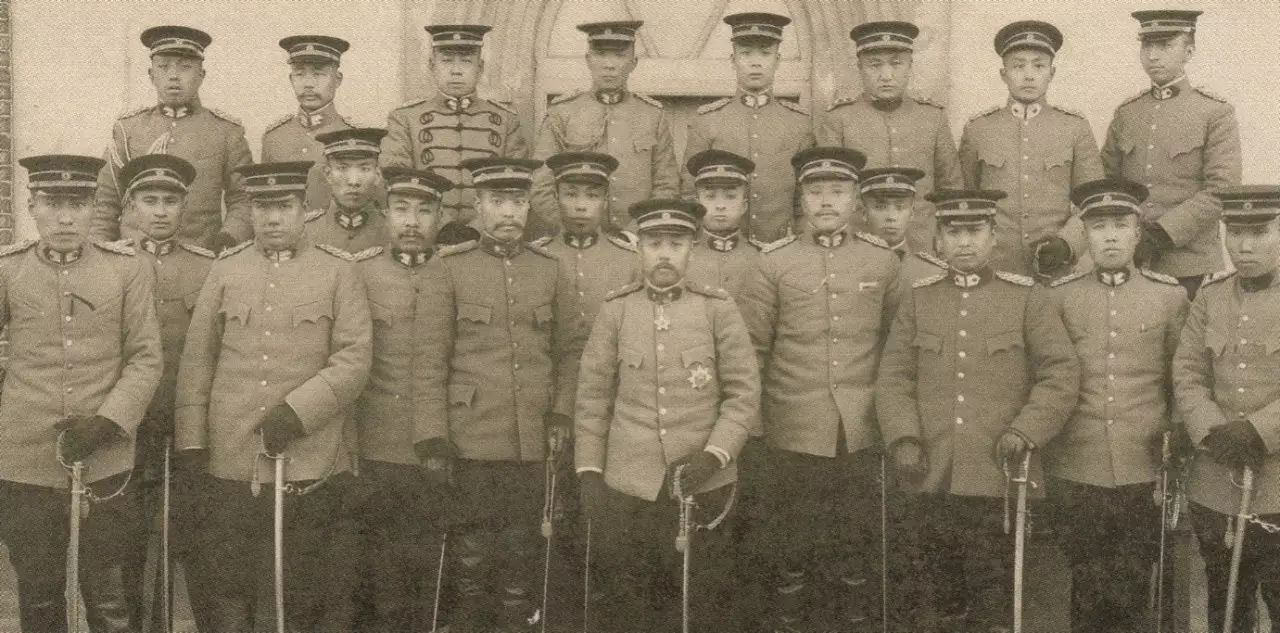
New Army constables

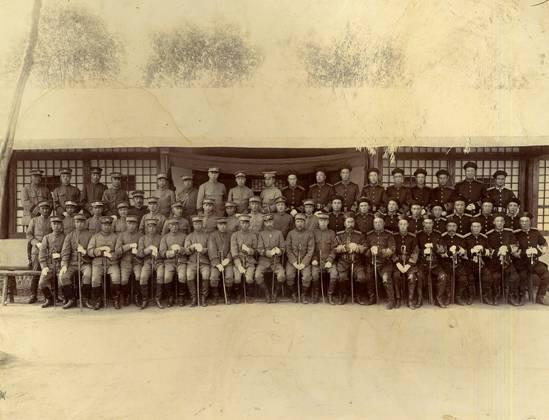
New Army in 1910

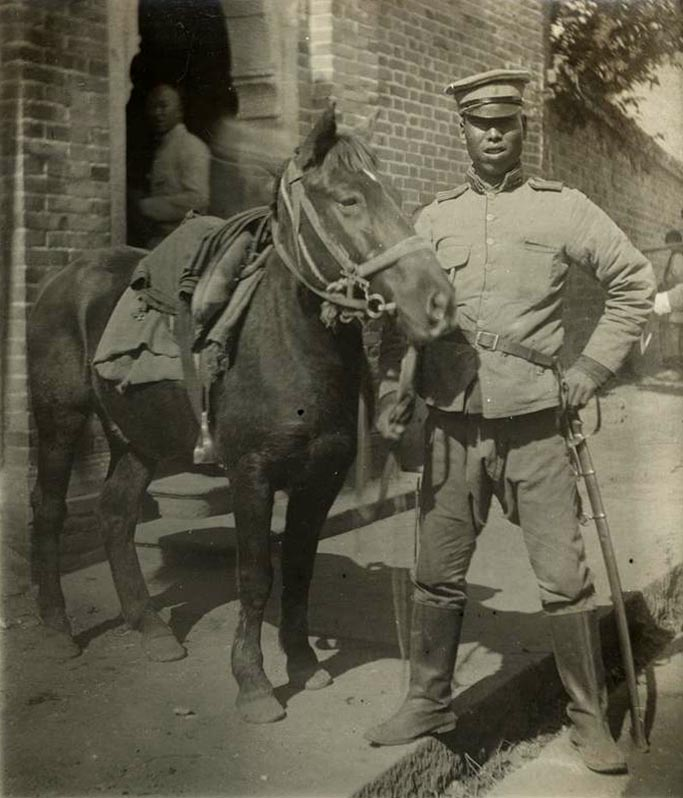
Cavalry of the Qing New Army

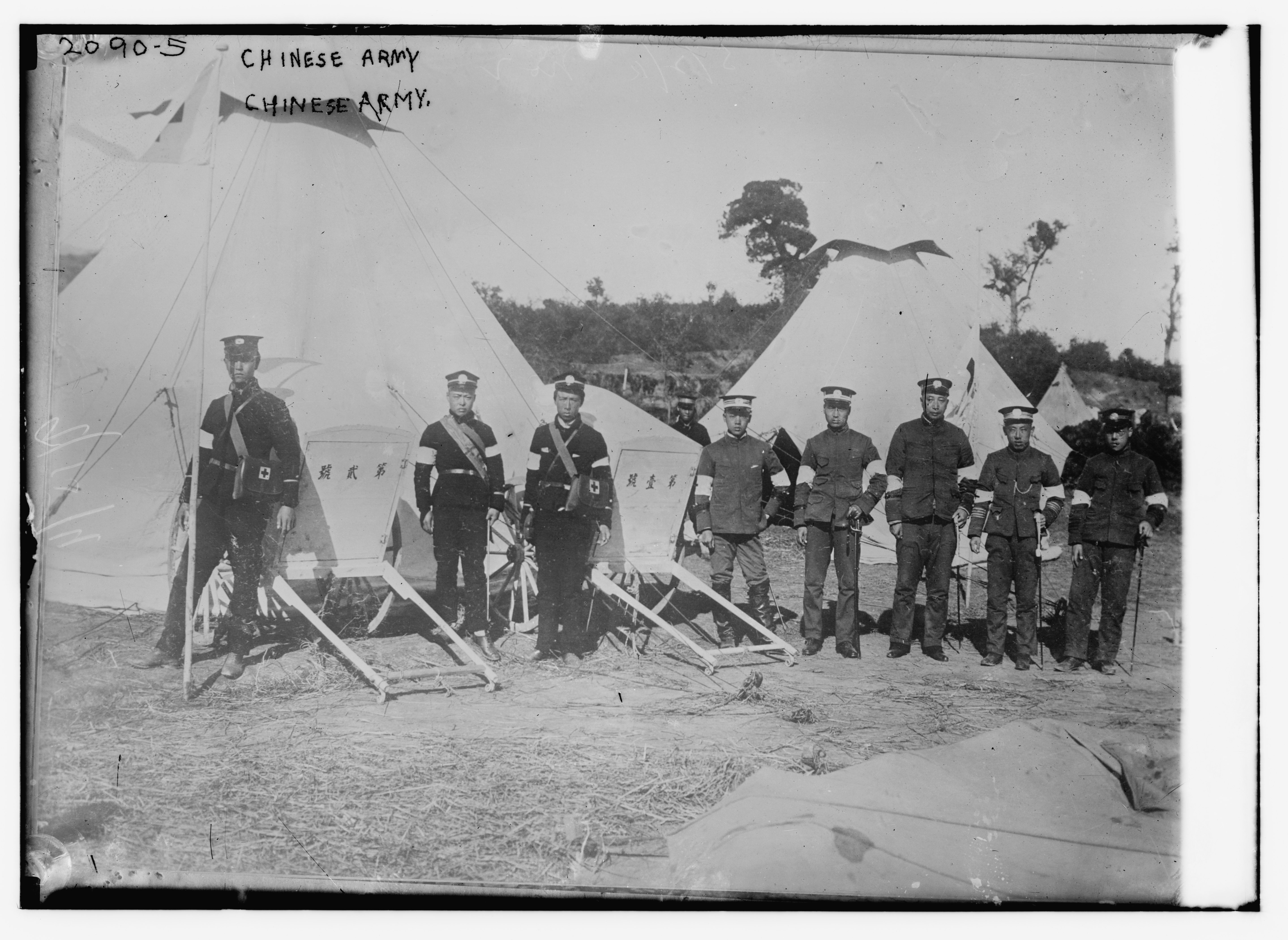
Chinese medics of the Qing New Army

== Zhang Zhidong in Liangjiang ==
Following the disastrous performance of the Qing armies in the First Sino-Japanese War Zhang Zhidong the then Viceroy of Liangjiang stated in a memorial that he intended to raise a 10,000 strong German-trained army with 8 infantry battalions of 250, 2 artillery battalions of 200, 2 cavalry battalions of 180 and 1 engineer battalion of 100 men with more men including doctors, veterinarians and armourers but no support staff such as quarter-masters, transportation or signal units. 35 Germans were to serve in the new army not as instructors but as actual commanders of the units. Every 6 months the German officers were to rotate to a new group of soldiers matching the numbers listed above and to train these men thus in 2 years Zhang Zhidong was to possess 10,000 crack German-trained soldiers it was estimated the 10,000 strong force would cost 440,000 taels annually. The memorial was approved however the force was transferred to Liu Kunyi who did not raise the army beyond its original group and increase it to the proposed 10,000 men as the throne feared provincial officials commanding powerful armies and wanted the force under the more conservative Liu.

== Notable figures of Beiyang ==
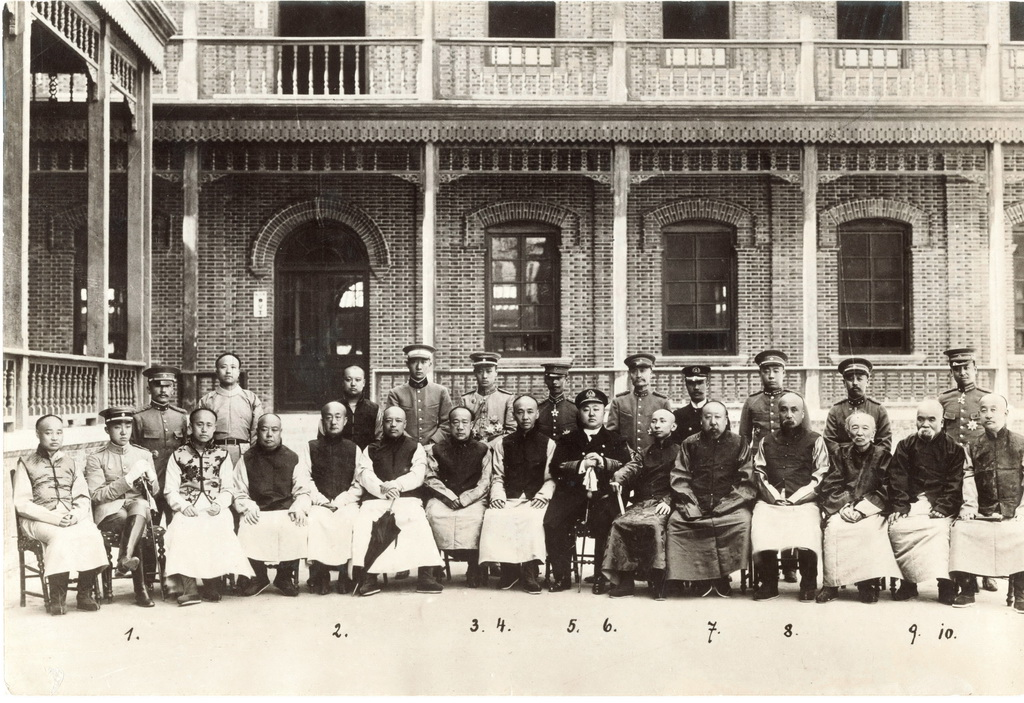
Several notable figures such as Zaitao, Zaixun, Xu Shichang, Sheng Xuanhuai, Zaizhen, and Yinchang

- Yuan Shikai (袁世凱)
- Duan Qirui (段祺瑞)
- Wang Yingkai (王英楷)
- Wu Peifu (吳佩孚)
- Feng Guozhang (馮國璋)
- Sun Chuanfang (孫傳芳)
- Xu Shichang (徐世昌)
- Wang Shizhen (王士珍)
- Cao Kun (曹錕)
- Zhang Xun (張勳)
- Feng Yuxiang (馮玉祥)
- Lu Yongxiang (盧永祥)
- Xu Shuzheng (徐樹錚)
- Zhang Zhizhong (張治中)
- Song Zheyuan (宋哲元)
- Tang Shengzhi (唐生智)
- Qin Dechun (秦德純)
- Qi Xieyuan (齊燮元)

== See also ==
- Military of the Qing dynasty
- Military history of China before 1912
- Late Qing reforms
- Beiyang Army
- Ever Victorious Army
