= Xiguan Subdistrict, Baoding =

Xiguan Subdistrict
- Subdistrict

Chinese transcription(s)
- Interactive map of Xiguan Subdistrict
- Coordinates: 38°51′55″N 115°29′01″E
- Country: China
- Province: Hebei
- Prefecture: Baoding
- District: Beishi District
- Time zone: UTC+8 (China Standard Time)

Xiguan Subdistrict (Chinese: 西关街道) is a township-level division of Beishi District, Baoding, Hebei, China.

== See also ==
- List of township-level divisions of Hebei
