= Dongguan Subdistrict, Baoding =

Dongguan Subdistrict 东关街道
- Subdistrict
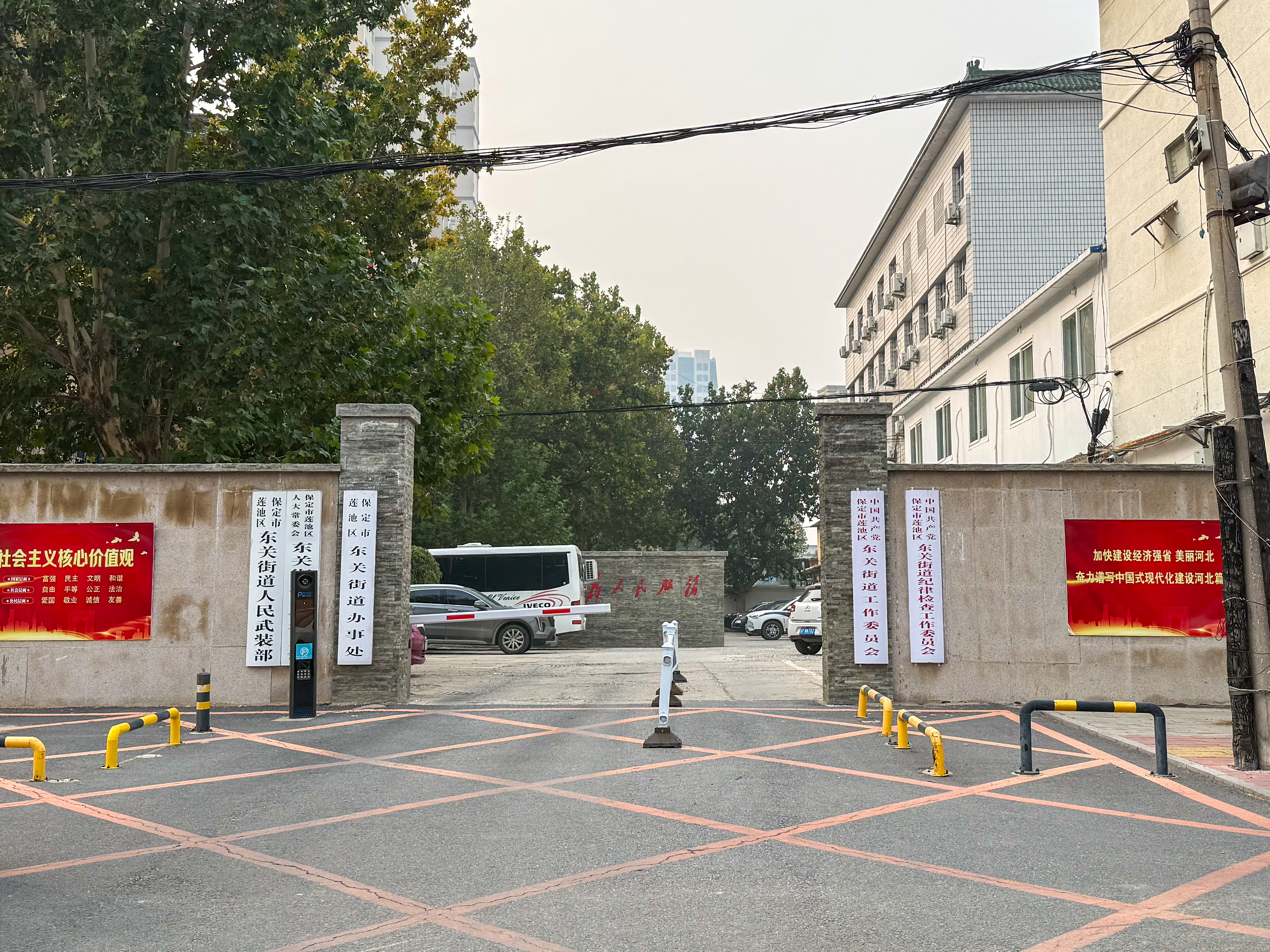

- Location in Hebei
- Coordinates: 38°51′35″N 115°30′34″E
- Country: People's Republic of China
- Province: Hebei
- Prefecture-level city: Baoding
- District: Beishi
- Village-level divisions: 10 residential communities 3 villages
- Elevation: 22 m (72 ft)
- Time zone: UTC+8 (China Standard)
- Postal code: 071000
- Area code: 0312

Dongguan Subdistrict (simplified Chinese: 东关街道; traditional Chinese: 東關街道; pinyin: Dōngguān Jiēdào; lit. 'east pass') is a subdistrict of Beishi District, in the heart of Baoding, Hebei, People's Republic of China. As of 2011, it has 10 residential communities (社区) and 3 villages under its administration.

== See also ==
- List of township-level divisions of Hebei
