= Yangzhuang Township, Hebei =

Coordinates: 38.85282°N 115.51684°E

- Subdistrict

Chinese transcription(s)
- Interactive map of Yangzhuang Township, Hebei
- Country: China
- Province: Hebei
- Prefecture: Baoding
- District: Nanshi District
- Time zone: UTC+8 (China Standard Time)

Yangzhuang Township, Hebei (Chinese: 杨庄乡) is a township-level division of Nanshi District, Baoding, Hebei, China.

== See also ==
- List of township-level divisions of Hebei
