= Nanshi District, Baoding =

Former district of Baoding, Hebei, China

Coordinates: 38°50′42″N 115°31′00″E

Nanshi District 南市区
- District of the People's Republic of China
- 2015
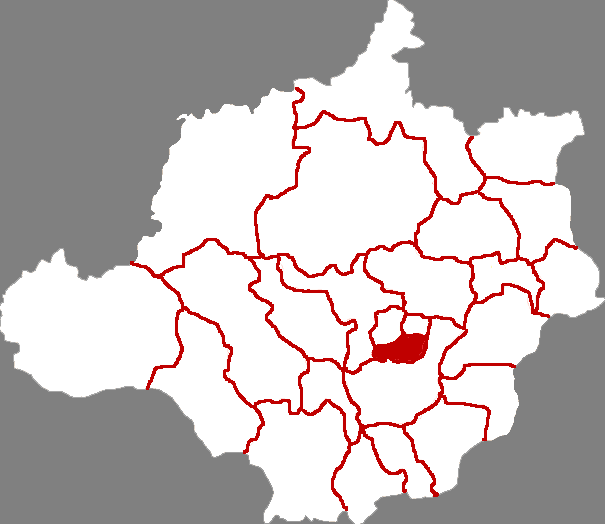
- Former location of Nanshi in Baoding
| Succeeded by |
| Lianchi District |
- Today part of: Part of the Lianchi District, Baoding

Nanshi District (simplified Chinese: 南市区; traditional Chinese: 南市區; pinyin: Nánshì Qū; lit. 'South City') is a former district of Baoding, Hebei, China. In May 2015, it was merged with Beishi District to form the new Lianchi District.

== Administrative divisions ==
There were five subdistricts and four townships at the time of merging:
Subdistricts:

- Lianmeng Subdistrict (联盟街道), Hongxing Subdistrict (红星街道), Yuhua Subdistrict (裕华街道), Yonghua Subdistrict (永华街道), Nanguan Subdistrict (南关街道)

Townships:

- Nandayuan Township (南大园乡), Jiaozhuang Township (焦庄乡), Yangzhuang Township (杨庄乡), Wuyao Township (五尧乡)
