= Hongxing Subdistrict, Baoding =

Hongxing Subdistrict 红星街道
- Subdistrict
- Location in Hebei
- Coordinates: 38°51′14″N 115°30′44″E
- Country: People's Republic of China
- Province: Hebei
- Prefecture-level city: Baoding
- District: Nanshi
- Village-level divisions: 6 residential communities
- Elevation: 23 m (75 ft)
- Time zone: UTC+8 (China Standard)
- Postal code: 071000
- Area code: 0312

Hongxing Subdistrict (simplified Chinese: 红星街道; traditional Chinese: 紅星街道; pinyin: Hóngxīng Jiēdào; lit. 'red star') is a subdistrict of Nanshi District, Baoding, Hebei, People's Republic of China. As of 2011, it has 6 residential communities (社区) under its administration.

== See also ==
- List of township-level divisions of Hebei
