= Hanzhuang Township, Baoding =

Hanzhuang Township 韩庄乡
- Township
- Location in Hebei
- Coordinates: 38°53′09″N 115°30′50″E
- Country: People's Republic of China
- Province: Hebei
- Prefecture-level city: Baoding
- District: Beishi
- Village-level divisions: 20 villages
- Elevation: 20 m (66 ft)
- Time zone: UTC+8 (China Standard)
- Area code: 0312

Hanzhuang Township (simplified Chinese: 韩庄乡; traditional Chinese: 韓莊鄉; pinyin: Hánzhuāng Xiāng) is a township of Beishi District, in the northeastern outskirts of Baoding, Hebei, People's Republic of China. As of 2011, it has 20 villages under its administration. In 1962, Tangut dharani pillars was discovered here.

== See also ==
- List of township-level divisions of Hebei
