= Bailou, Hebei =

Bailou 百楼镇
- Town
- Location in Hebei
- Coordinates: 38°53′56″N 115°33′08″E
- Country: People's Republic of China
- Province: Hebei
- Prefecture-level city: Baoding
- District: Lianchi District
- Village-level divisions: 13 villages
- Elevation: 18 m (59 ft)
- Time zone: UTC+8 (China Standard)
- Area code: 0312

Bailou (simplified Chinese: 百楼; traditional Chinese: 百樓; pinyin: Bǎilóu) is a town of Lianchi District of Baoding, Hebei, China. As of 2020, it had 13 villages under its administration:

- Xibailou Village (西百楼村)
- Caizhuang Village (蔡庄村)
- Dongbailou Village (东百楼村)
- Dongdafuzhuang Village (东大夫庄村)
- Xidafuzhuang Village (西大夫庄村)
- Houying Village (后营村)
- Chailou Village (柴楼村)
- Beizhangzhuang Village (北张庄村)
- Toutai Village (头台村)
- Nanchangbao Village (南常保村)
- Taibaoying Village (太保营村)
- Lujiasi Village (路家寺村)
- Yangzhihuiying Village (杨指挥营村)

== See also ==
- List of township-level divisions of Hebei
