= Wusi Road Subdistrict =

- Subdistrict

Chinese transcription(s)
- Interactive map of Wusi Road Subdistrict
- Coordinates: 38°53′04″N 115°30′03″E
- Country: China
- Province: Hebei
- Prefecture: Baoding
- District: Beishi District
- Time zone: UTC+8 (China Standard Time)

Wusi Road Subdistrict (Chinese: 五四路街道) is a township-level division of Beishi District, Baoding, Hebei, China.

== See also ==
- List of township-level divisions of Hebei
