= Nandayuan Township =

- Subdistrict

Chinese transcription(s)
  - Chinese: 南大园乡
- Location in Hebei Nandayuan Township (China)
- Coordinates: 38°50′11″N 115°29′59″E
- Country: China
- Province: Hebei
- Prefecture: Baoding
- District: Nanshi District
- Time zone: UTC+8 (China Standard Time)

Nandayuan Township (Chinese: 南大园乡) is a township-level division of Nanshi District, Baoding, Hebei, China.

== See also ==
- List of township-level divisions of Hebei
