= Zhonghua Road Subdistrict, Baoding =

Coordinates: 38.8635°N 115.5016°E

- Subdistrict

Chinese transcription(s)
- Interactive map of Zhonghua Road Subdistrict, Baoding
- Country: China
- Province: Hebei
- Prefecture: Baoding
- District: Beishi District
- Time zone: UTC+8 (China Standard Time)

Zhonghua Road Subdistrict, Baoding (Chinese: 中华路街道) is a township-level division of Beishi District, Baoding, Hebei, China.

== See also ==
- List of township-level divisions of Hebei
