= Nanguan Subdistrict, Baoding =

Nanguan Subdistrict 南关街道
- Subdistrict
- Location in Hebei
- Coordinates: 38.84494°N 115.48403°E
- Country: China
- Province: Hebei
- Prefecture-level city: Baoding
- District: Lianchi District
- Time zone: UTC+8 (China Standard Time)

Nanguan Subdistrict (Chinese: 南关街道) is a township-level division of Lianchi District, Baoding, Hebei, China. As of 2020, it administers the following 13 residential neighborhoods:

- Nanguan Avenue Community (南关大街社区)
- Shizhuang Community (史庄社区)
- Jianguo Road Community (建国路社区)
- Xintai Community (鑫泰社区)
- Hebei Agricultural University First Community (河北农大一社区)
- Xinhexingdu Community (鑫和星都社区)
- Jinxiuxincheng Community (锦绣鑫城社区)
- Yufengsanqi Community (裕丰三期社区)
- Jiahuiyuan Community (嘉会园社区)
- Zihengjiayuan Community (紫横家园社区)
- Haodaxinju Community (浩达馨居社区)
- Xinxinwenyayuan Community (鑫欣文雅苑社区)
- Yufeng Community (裕丰社区)

== See also ==
- List of township-level divisions of Hebei
