= Yonghua Subdistrict =

Coordinates: 38°51′19″N 115°29′05″E

- Subdistrict

Chinese transcription(s)
- Interactive map of Yonghua Subdistrict
- Country: China
- Province: Hebei
- Prefecture: Baoding
- District: Nanshi District
- Time zone: UTC+8 (China Standard Time)

Yonghua Subdistrict (Chinese: 永华街道) is a township-level division of Nanshi District, Baoding, Hebei, China.

== See also ==
- List of township-level divisions of Hebei
