= Yuhua Subdistrict, Baoding =

Coordinates: 38.85549°N 115.49378°E

- Subdistrict

Chinese transcription(s)
- Interactive map of Yuhua Subdistrict, Baoding
- Country: China
- Province: Hebei
- Prefecture: Baoding
- District: Nanshi District
- Time zone: UTC+8 (China Standard Time)

Yuhua Subdistrict, Baoding (Chinese: 裕华街道) is a township-level division of Nanshi District, Baoding, Hebei, China.

== See also ==
- List of township-level divisions of Hebei
