= Wuyao Township =

Coordinates: 38°49′08″N 115°26′38″E

- Subdistrict

Chinese transcription(s)
- Interactive map of Wuyao Township
- Country: China
- Province: Hebei
- Prefecture: Baoding
- District: Nanshi District
- Time zone: UTC+8 (China Standard Time)

Wuyao Township (Chinese: 五尧乡) is a township-level division of Nanshi District, Baoding, Hebei, China.

== See also ==
- List of township-level divisions of Hebei
