= Beishi District =

Beishi District 北市区
- District
- Location in Hebei
- Coordinates: 38°53′00″N 115°29′50″E
- Country: People's Republic of China
- Province: Hebei
- Prefecture-level city: Baoding
- Time zone: UTC+8 (China Standard)

Beishi District (simplified Chinese: 北市区; traditional Chinese: 北市區; pinyin: Běishì Qū; lit. 'North City') is a district of Baoding, Hebei, People's Republic of China. In May 2015, it was merged with Nanshi District to form the new Lianchi District.

== Administrative Divisions ==
Subdistricts:

- Hepingli Subdistrict (和平里街道), Wusi Road Subdistrict (五四路街道), Siguan Subdistrict (西关街道), Zhonghua Road Subdistrict (中华路街道), Dongguan Subdistrict (东关街道)

Townships:

- Hanzhuang Township (韩庄乡), Dongjinzhuang Township (东金庄乡), Bailou Township (百楼乡)
