= Dongjinzhuang Township =

Dongjinzhuang Township 东金庄乡
- Township
- Location in Hebei
- Coordinates: 38°52′23″N 115°32′07″E
- Country: People's Republic of China
- Province: Hebei
- Prefecture-level city: Baoding
- District: Lianchi District
- Village-level divisions: 17 villages
- Elevation: 18 m (59 ft)
- Time zone: UTC+8 (China Standard)
- Postal code: 071000
- Area code: 0312

Dongjinzhuang Township (simplified Chinese: 东金庄乡; traditional Chinese: 東金莊鄉; pinyin: Dōngjīnzhuāng Xiāng) is a township of Lianchi District, Baoding, Hebei, People's Republic of China. As of 2020, it has 17 villages under its administration:

- Dongjinzhuang Village
- Liangzhuang Village (梁庄村)
- Yindingzhuang Village (银定庄村)
- Hexinzhuang Village (何辛庄村)
- Mijiadi Village (米家堤村)
- Guoxinzhuang Village (郭辛庄村)
- Donghouying Village (东后营村)
- Zhangxinzhuang Village (张辛庄村)
- Houxinzhuang Village (后辛庄村)
- Qianxinzhuang Village (前辛庄村)
- Lanxinzhuang Village (兰辛庄村)
- Wangxinzhuang Village (王辛庄村)
- Xikangge Village (西康各庄村)
- Xiaodi Village (小堤村)
- Mazhuang Village (马庄村)
- Shangzhuang Village (尚庄村)
- Fu Village (付村)

== See also ==
- List of township-level divisions of Hebei
