= Bailou Township =

Bailou Township 白楼乡
- Township
- Location in Henan
- Coordinates: 34°14′19″N 115°6′25″E
- Country: People's Republic of China
- Province: Henan
- Prefecture-level city: Shangqiu
- County: Sui County
- Time zone: UTC+8 (China Standard)

Bailou Township (simplified Chinese: 白楼乡; traditional Chinese: 白樓鄉; pinyin: Báilóu Xiāng) is a township of Sui County in Shangqiu, Henan, China. As of 2020, it had 26 villages under its administration:

- Bailou Village
- Xigang Village (西岗村)
- Tonglou Village (童楼村)
- Bailou Yangzhuang Village (白楼杨庄村)
- Malou Village (马楼村)
- Qiancailiu Village (前蔡刘村)
- Junzhao Village (君赵村)
- Magang Village (马岗村)
- Zhuqiao Village (朱桥村)
- Siqiao Village (司桥村)
- Jiangzhuang Village (蒋庄村)
- Yuzhuang Village (余庄村)
- Wangtang Village (王堂村)
- Fanlou Village (范楼村)
- Jindong Village (金东村)
- Jinxi Village (金西村)
- Wangguan Village (王关村)
- Jianglou Village (蒋楼村)
- Guopi Village (郭皮村)
- Shunhenan Village (顺河南村)
- Shunhebei Village (顺河北村)
- Renzhuang Village (任庄村)
- Fengzhuang Village (冯庄村)
- Sunlou Village (孙楼村)
- Qianyintang Village (前殷堂村)
- Ruanwa Village (阮洼村)

== See also ==
- List of township-level divisions of Henan
