= Hepingli Subdistrict, Baoding =

Hepingli Subdistrict 和平里街道
- Subdistrict
- Location in Hebei
- Coordinates: 38°51′43″N 115°29′13″E
- Country: People's Republic of China
- Province: Hebei
- Prefecture-level city: Baoding
- District: Beishi
- Village-level divisions: 10 residential communities
- Elevation: 24 m (79 ft)
- Time zone: UTC+8 (China Standard)
- Postal code: 071000
- Area code: 0312

Hepingli Subdistrict (Chinese: 和平里街道; pinyin: Hépínglǐ Jiēdào) is a subdistrict and the seat of Beishi District, in the heart of Baoding, Hebei, People's Republic of China. As of 2011, it has 10 residential communities (社区) under its administration.

== See also ==
- List of township-level divisions of Hebei
