= Jiaozhuang Township, Hebei =

Jiaozhuang Township 焦庄乡
- Township
- Location in Hebei
- Coordinates: 38°50′08″N 115°32′05″E
- Country: People's Republic of China
- Province: Hebei
- Prefecture-level city: Baoding
- District: Nanshi
- Village-level divisions: 18 villages
- Elevation: 16 m (52 ft)
- Time zone: UTC+8 (China Standard)
- Area code: 0312

Jiaozhuang Township (simplified Chinese: 焦庄乡; traditional Chinese: 焦莊鄉; pinyin: Jiāozhuāng Xiāng) is a township of Nanshi District, in the southeastern outskirts of Baoding, Hebei, People's Republic of China. As of 2011, it has 18 villages under its administration.

== See also ==
- List of township-level divisions of Hebei
