= Hu Jingyi =

Chinese warlord and governor of Henan (1892 – 1925)

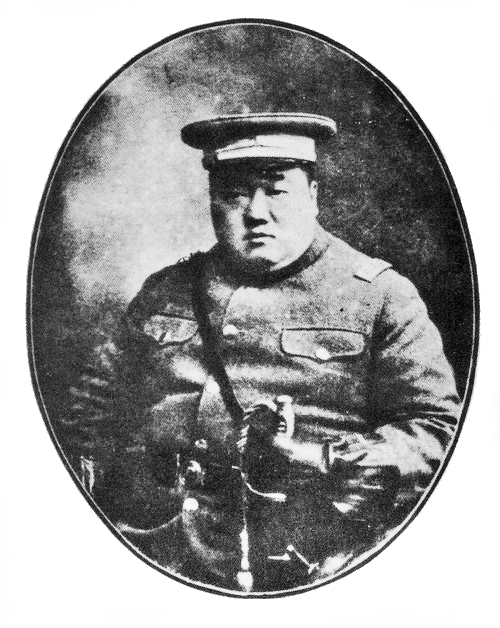
Hu Jingyi

Hu Jingyi (Chinese: 胡景翼; pinyin: Hú Jǐngyì; 1892 – 1925), Chinese general, warlord and military governor of Henan (1924–25) during the Warlord Era of China.

Hu Jingyi was born on 4 June 1892, Fuping County, Shaanxi. He joined the Chinese Revolutionary Alliance in 1910. Following the Wuchang Uprising in 1911 he led a revolt in Shaanxi. He became a general of Kuomintang forces during the "Second Revolution" against Yuan Shikai's dictatorship in 1913. He held several posts in the Shaanxi army over the following decades.

During the Second Zhili–Fengtian War in the autumn of 1924, Feng Yuxiang betrayed the Zhili clique when he led his army from the battlefield to execute the Beijing coup, detaining its leader President Cao Kun, and reorganized his forces as the Guominjun. Hu was named deputy commander-in-chief and the commander of the 3rd Army as well as governor of Henan.

The Soviets decided to assist Feng with advisers and assistance in arming the Guominjun, with the intent of forming another movement like the KMT in north China. In return for arms, Feng and Hu gave the Russian and Chinese Communists a free hand in their territories. Feng and Hu sent 25 high-ranking officers to the Soviet Union for military training. However, Hu died suddenly in office on 10 April 1925 and was succeeded by Yue Weijun.

== Sources ==
- Odoric Y. K. Wou, Mobilizing the Masses: Building Revolution in Henan, Stanford University Press, 1994, ISBN 0-8047-2142-4.
- 陈贤庆(Chen Xianqing), 民国军阀派系谈 (The Republic of China warlord cliques discussed), 2007 revised edition
- Rulers: Chinese Administrative divisions, Henan
- Rulers: Index Ho-Hy, Hu Jingyi
