= Beijing Coup =

Beijing coup could be:

- 1861 Beijing Coup, which removed the Eight Regents of Xianfeng Emperor
- 1898 Beijing Coup, which ended the Hundred Days' Reform
- 1912 Beijing Coup, during which the Beiyang Army rebelled against the Qing dynasty
- 1917 Manchu Restoration, a failed attempt to restore the Qing dynasty
- 1924 Beijing Coup, which removed Cao Kun’s administration and the Qing house from Beijing
- 1925 Beijing Coup, a failed attempt to remove Duan Qirui
- 1976 Beijing Coup, which removed the Gang of Four
