= Naxun Lanbao =

- Born: 1824; Ulaanbaatar
- Died: 1873 (aged 48–49)
- Occupation: Poet
- Spouse(s): Heng-en
- Children: Aixinjueluo Yi, Sheng-yu
- Parent(s): Dorje Wangchuk

Naxun Lanbao (Chinese: 那遜蘭保; 1824 – 1873), also known by the courtesy name Lianyao (莲友), was a Mongolian poet who was raised at the court of the Daoguang Emperor. She is the earliest Qing dynasty Mongol woman with a poetry collection still extant.

Naxun Lanbao was born in 1824 in Kulun (modern-day Ulaanbaatar). She was the daughter of Dorje Wangchuk (多尔济旺楚克), a member of the Borjigit clan of Khalkha Mongols. Her mother was a daughter of the Manchu poet Wanyan Jinchi (完顏金樨).

Dorje Wangchuk was one of four sons of the Borjigit prince 蕴端多尔济 who were rewarded with imperial posts by the Daoguang Emperor. Following his father's death in 1828, Dorje Wangchuk was assigned to be an imperial guard at the Gate of Supreme Harmony of the Forbidden City. The four year old Naxun Lanbao accompanied her parents to Beijing, where she would spend the rest of her life, so acclimating that she claimed to have forgotten how to speak Mongolian. She was largely raised by her grandmother, Wanyan Jinchi. At the age of seventeen, she married Heng-en (恒恩), an imperial censor and grandson of Yongxi (永錫), the sixth Prince Su. Their second son was Shengyu (盛昱), a respected official and scholar.

In 1873, she published two collections by other poets. She collected her grandmother Wanyan Jinchi's poems as Poetry Collection of the Pavilion of Green Rue (Lityunxuan shiji) and reissued a condensed version of the 1857 publication of poems of her friend Baibao Youlan, Collected Poems of Cold Reds Studio (Lenghongxuan shiji). These were intended to be the first two volumes of her ambitious and never-realized project, a collection of the works of Manchu women poets, Anthology of Poetry from Manchu Inner Chambers (Manzhou guige shichao 滿州閨閣詩鈔). After her death, her son Shengyu collected and published her poems in 1874 as Preserved Poems of the Hall of Fragrant Rue (Yunxiangguan yishi).
