= Sun Yue =

Sun Yue (Wade–Giles: Sun Yueh) may refer to:

- Sun Yue (warlord) (孙岳, 1878–1928), Chinese warlord
- Sun Yueh (孫越, 1930–2018), Chinese/Taiwanese actor
- Sun Yue (singer) (孙悦, born 1972), Chinese female singer
- Sun Yue (volleyball) (孙玥, born 1973), female Chinese volleyball player
- Sun Yue (basketball) (孙悦, born 1985), Chinese male basketball player
- Sun Yue (curler) (born 1986), Chinese female curler
- Sun Yue (rugby union), Chinese rugby sevens player
- Sun Yue (shot putter) (born 2001), Chinese shot putter

== See also ==
- Sun Yu (disambiguation)
