= Gate of Manifest Virtue =

Historic structure in Beijing, China

- 昭德门
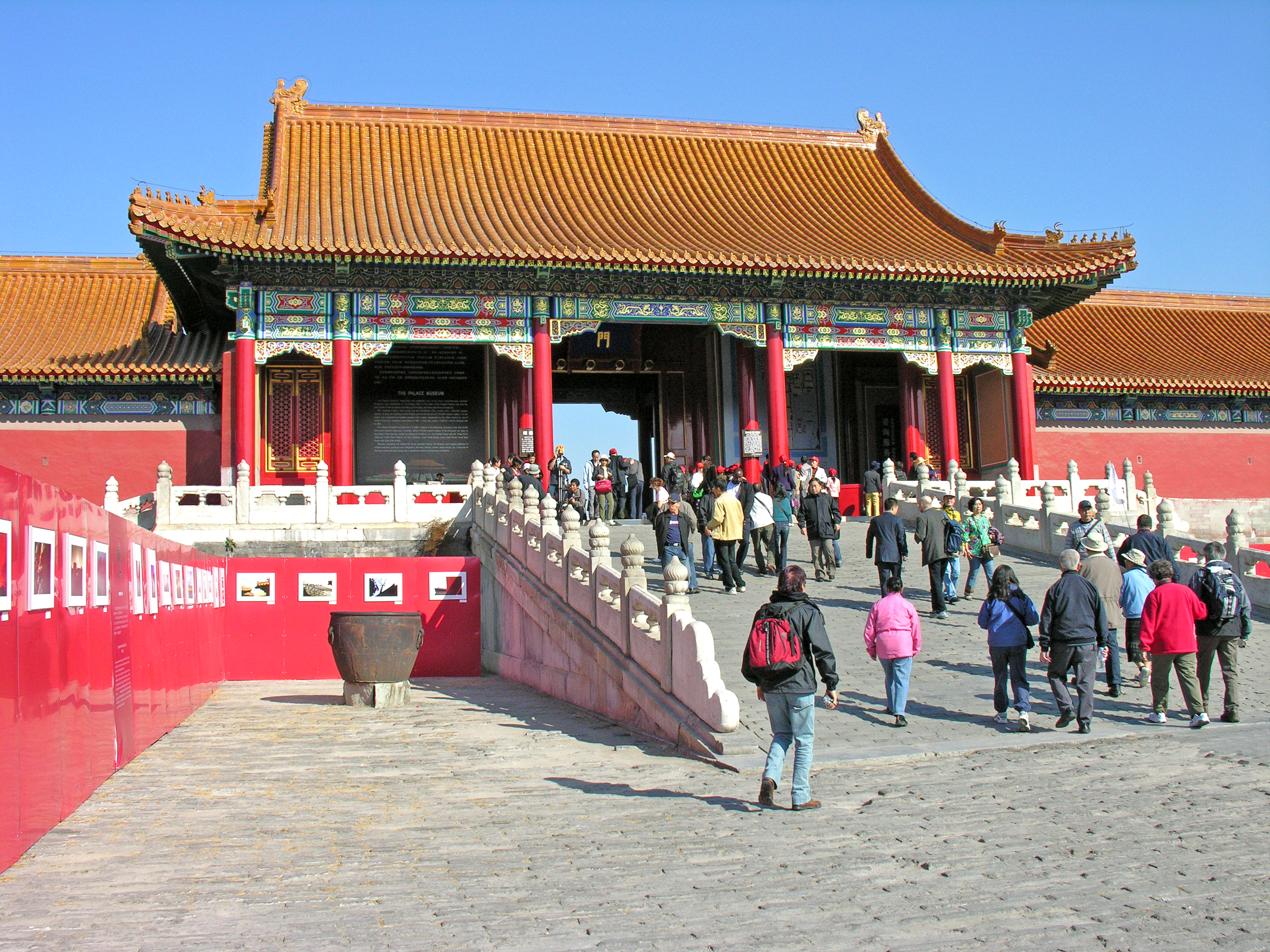
- The gate in 2006
- Former names: Eastern Corner Gate

General information
- Type: Gate
- Location: Forbidden City

The Gate of Manifest Virtue (simplified Chinese: 昭德门; traditional Chinese: 昭德門) is a gate in the Forbidden City. It is located on the eastern side next to the Gate of Supreme Harmony. It was first called the Eastern Corner Gate in the Ming Dynasty.
