= Gate of Blending Harmony =

Historic structure in Beijing, China

- 协和门
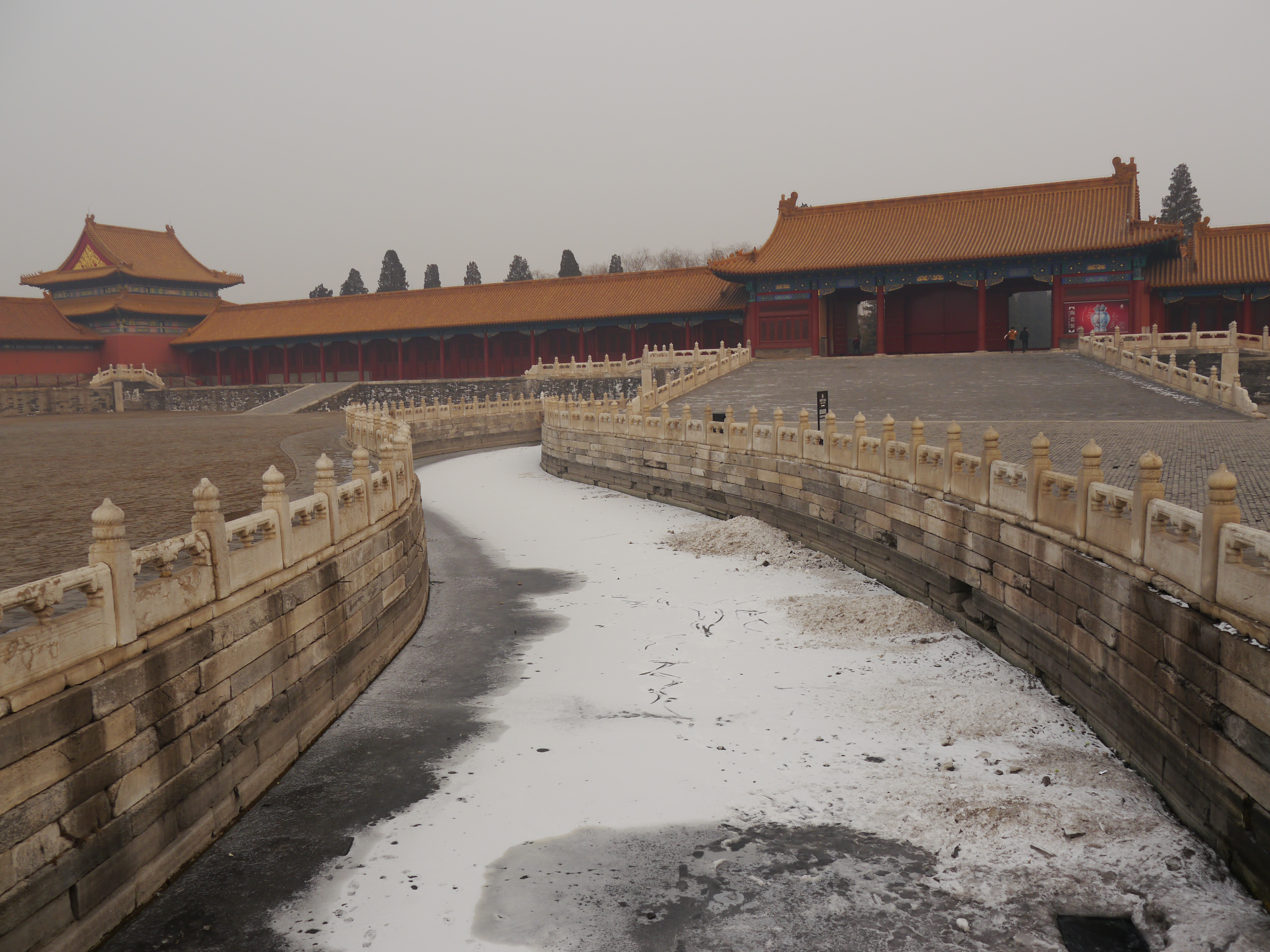
- Looking from the eastern side to the Gate of Blending Harmony
- Former names: Gate of Left Obedience
- Alternative names: Gate of Xiehe, Xiehemen

General information
- Type: Gate
- Town or city: Forbidden City
- Coordinates: 39.914527°N 116.398516°E

The Gate of Blending Harmony (Chinese: 协和门), or the Gate of Xiehe, Xiehemen, is a gate sits on the central road of the outer court of the Forbidden City, outside of the Gate of Supreme Harmony. On the eastern and opposite of the road to the Gate of Glorious Harmony. It was first built in the 18th year of Yongle and named the Gate of Left Obedience. The current one is re-built in the early years of Shunzhi and named so.
