= Gate of Glorious Harmony =

Historic structure in Beijing, China

- 熙和门
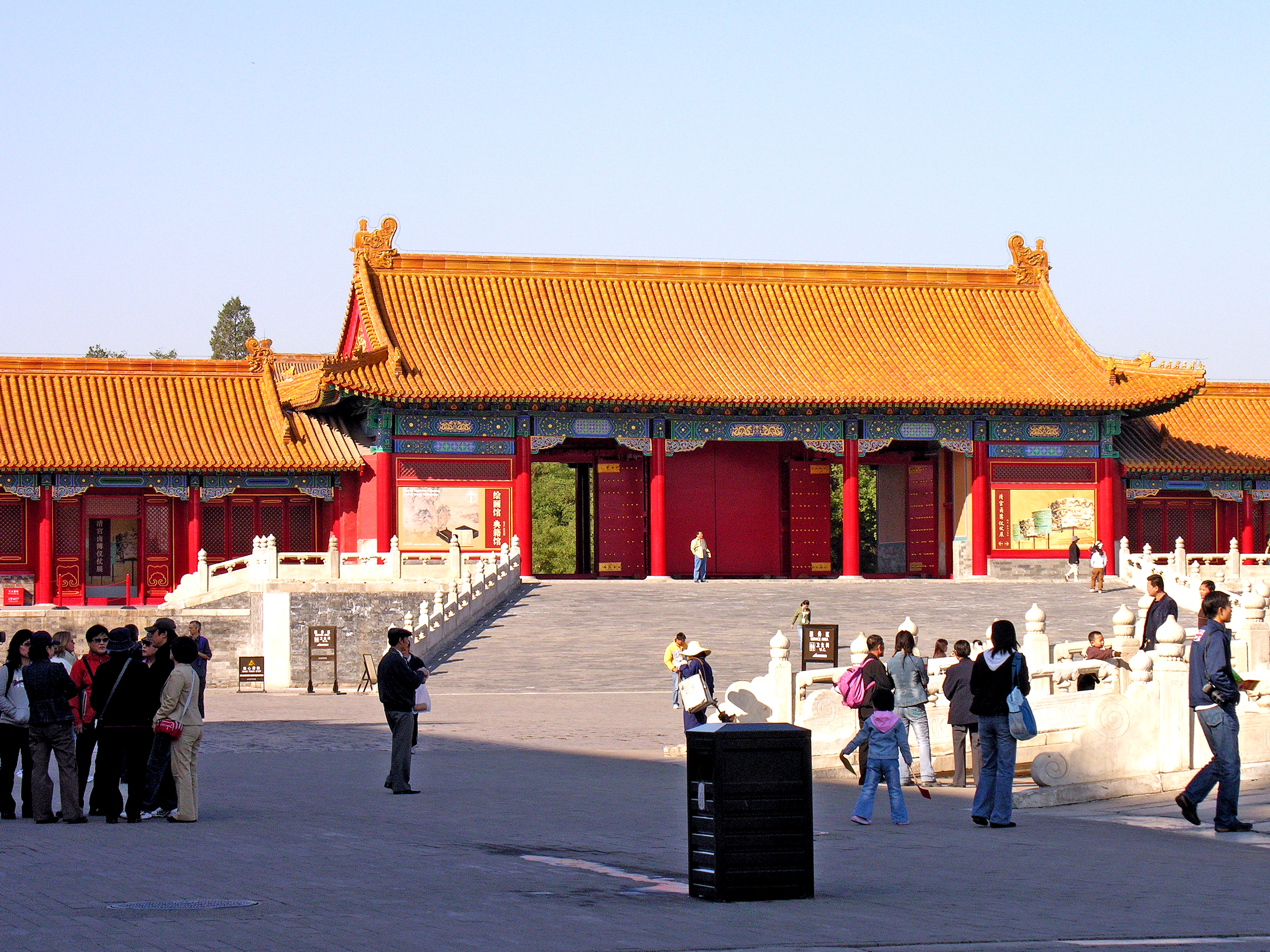
- Eastern Side of the Gate of Glorious Harmony
- Former names: Gate of Right Obedience
- Alternative names: Gate of Xihe, Xihemen

General information
- Type: Gate
- Coordinates: 39.914592°N 116.395868°E
- Opened: 1420

The Gate of Glorious Harmony (simplified Chinese: 熙和门; traditional Chinese: 熙和門; Manchu: ᡳᠵᡳᠰᡥᡡᠨ
ᡥᡡᠸᠠᠯᡳᠶᠠᠮᠪᡠᡵᡝ
ᡩᡠᡴᠠ ijishūn hūwaliyambure duka), or the Gate of Xihe, Xihemen is a gate sits on the central road of the outer court of the Forbidden Palace. It is on the outer side of the Gate of Supreme Harmony, and eastern to the Gate of Blending Harmony It was first built on the 18th year of Yongle (1420) and was named Gate of Right Obedience. The current building is built on the 23rd year of Qianlong (1758).
