= Beijing Central Axis =

Stretch of road in Beijing, China

Beijing Central Axis: A Building Ensemble Exhibiting the Ideal Order of the Chinese Capital
UNESCO World Heritage Site
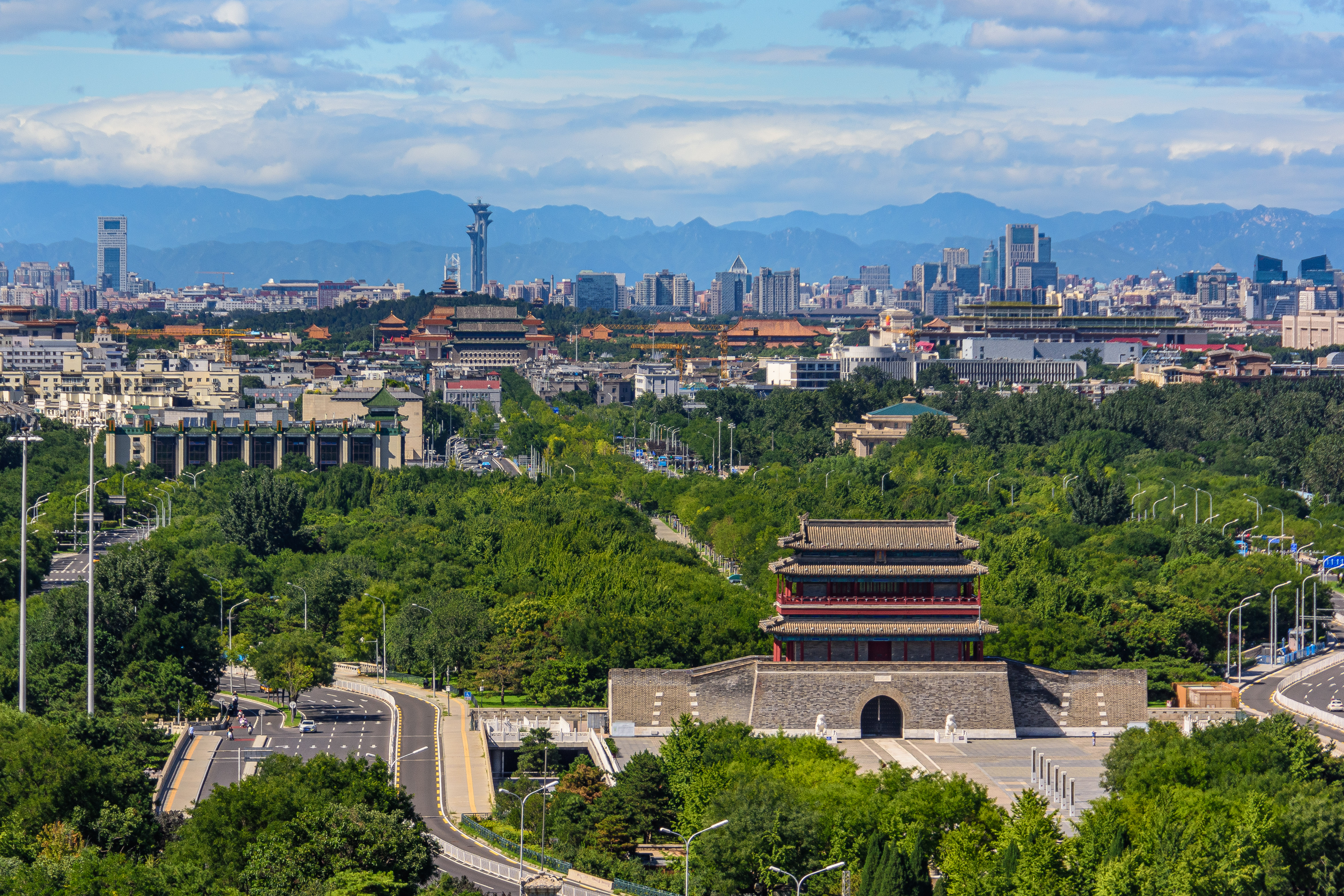
- South-to-north view of the Beijing Central Axis, taken from Yongdingmen
- Interactive map of Beijing Central Axis: A Building Ensemble Exhibiting the Ideal Order of the Chinese Capital
- Criteria: Cultural: (iii), (iv)
- Reference: 1714
- Inscription: 2024 (46th Session)
- Coordinates: 39°53′59″N 116°23′30″E

The Beijing Central Axis (simplified Chinese: 北京中轴线; traditional Chinese: 北京中軸綫; pinyin: Běijīng Zhōngzhóuxiàn), or Central Axis (simplified Chinese: 中轴线; traditional Chinese: 中軸綫; pinyin: Zhōngzhóuxiàn), refers to a stretch of road in Beijing, China. Beijing Central Axis extends 7.8 kilometers from the Drum and Bell Towers in the north to the Yongdingmen Gate in the south.

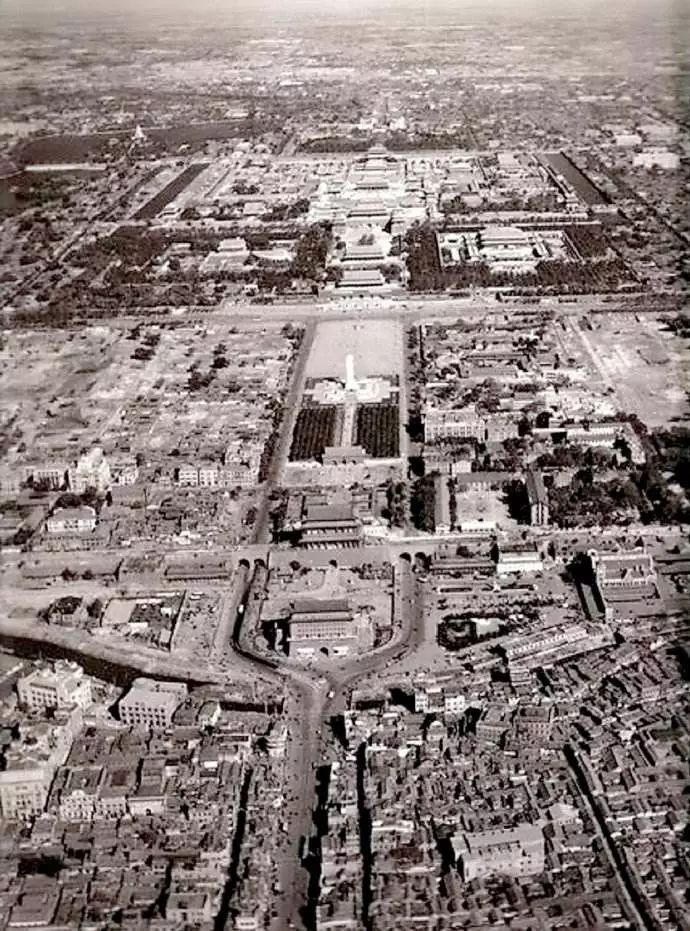
The axis in 1959

Beijing Central Axis boasts both ceremonial and iconic buildings dating back to the 13th century (Yuan dynasty). These structures, with distinctive features, serve as exemplars of ancient Chinese architecture. When so many heritages come together, the complex becomes a story of Chinese civilization and the process of unity in Chinese history, as well as a concise overview of Chinese aesthetics.

The Central Axis was inscribed in the UNESCO List of World Heritage Sites in China.

== Landmarks ==
Beijing Central Axis is in turn from north to south, Drum and Bell Towers, Wanning Bridge, Jingshan Hill, Forbidden City, Altar of Land and Grain, Imperial Ancestral Temple, Upright Gate, Tian'anmen Gate, Outer Jinshui Bridges, Tian’anmen Square Complex, Zhengyangmen, Temple of Heaven, Altar of the God of Agriculture, Southern Section Road Archeological Sites, Yongdingmen Gate.

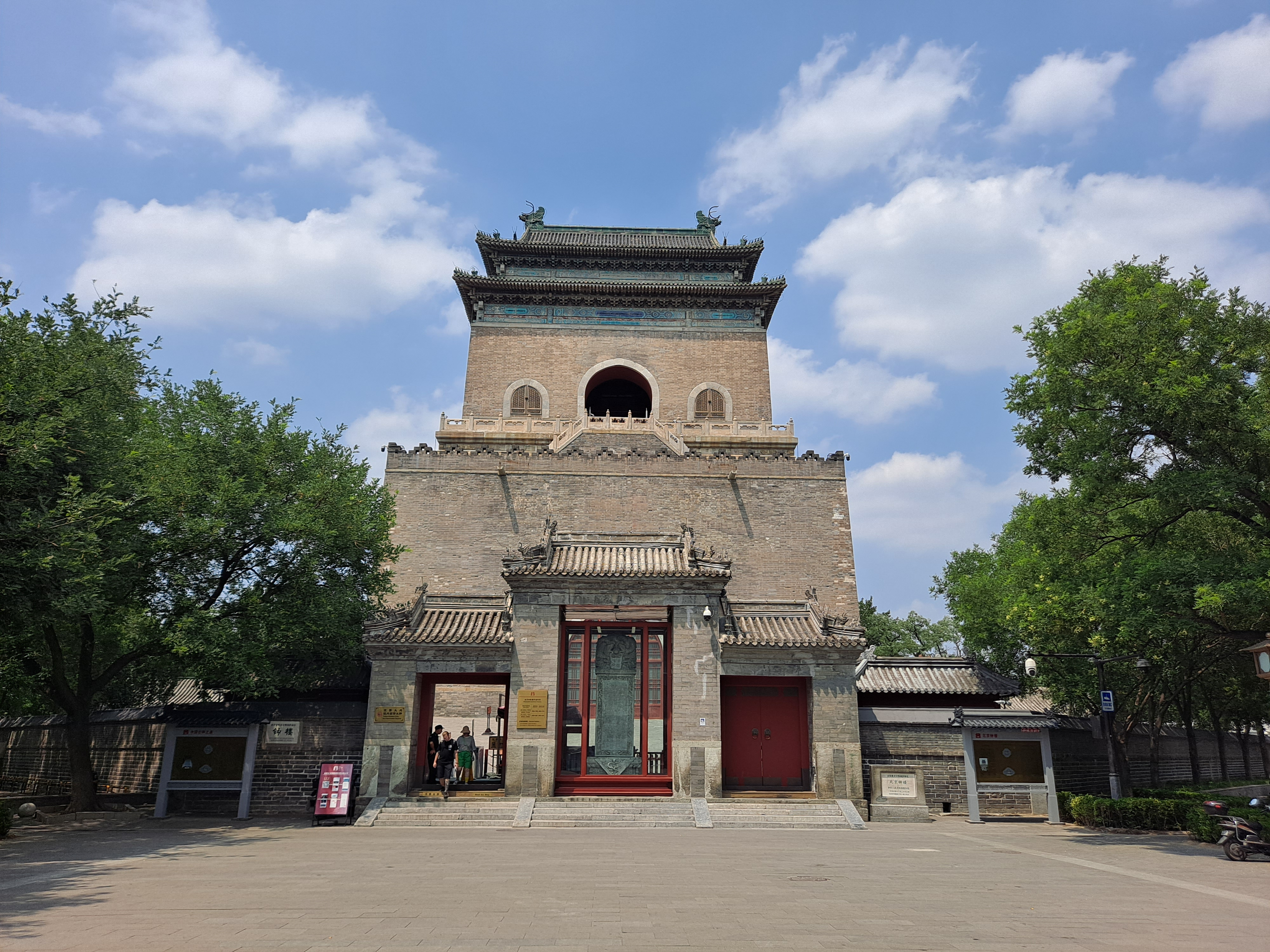
Bell tower (钟楼)

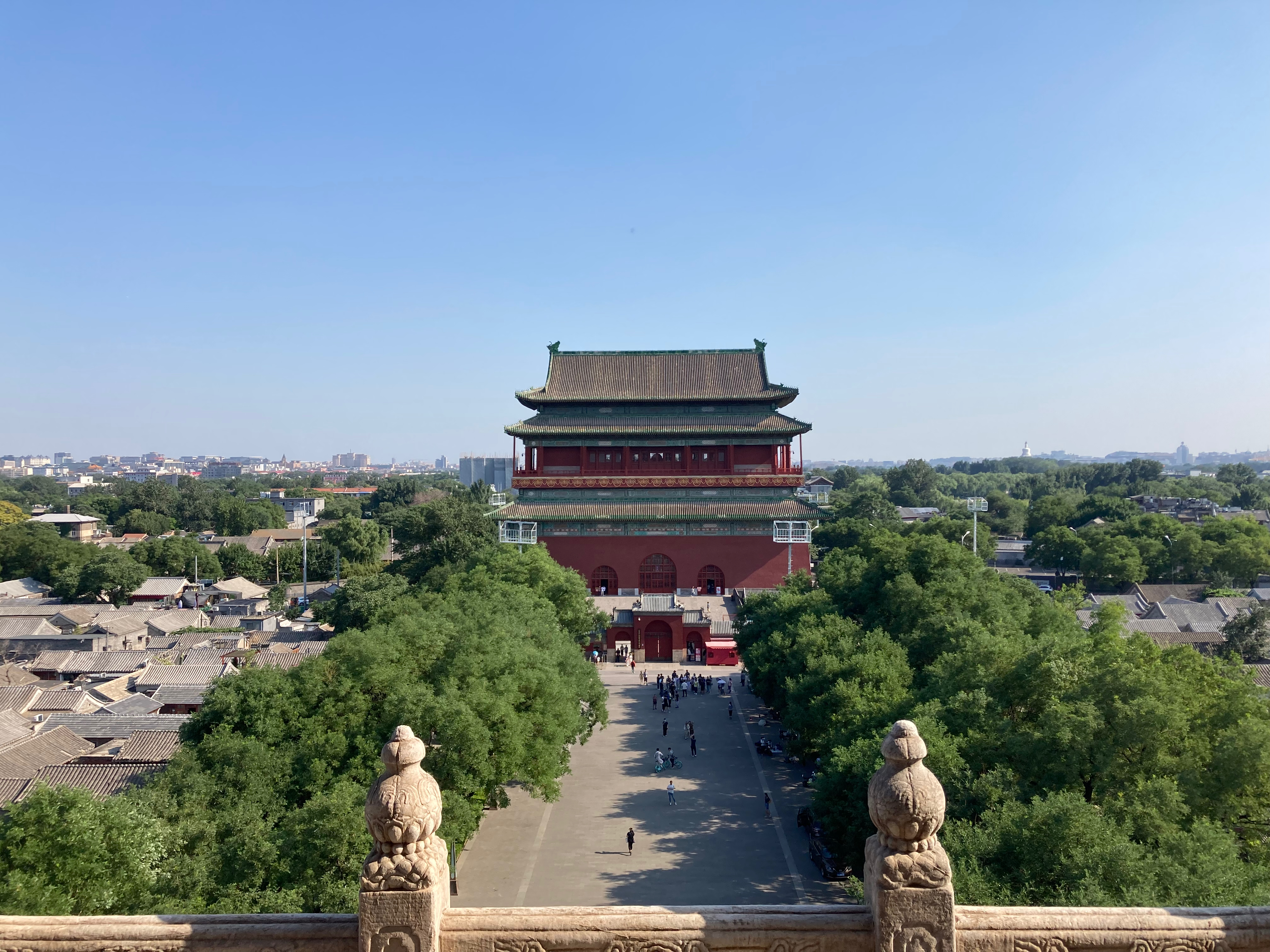
Drum tower (鼓楼)

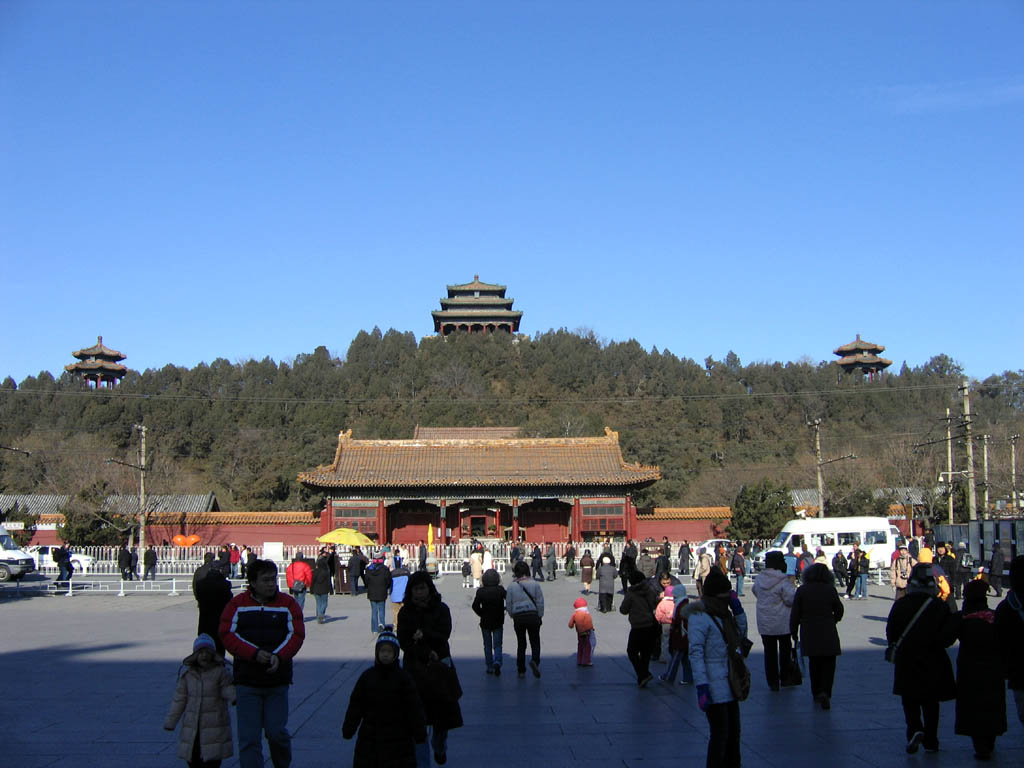
Jingshan (景山)

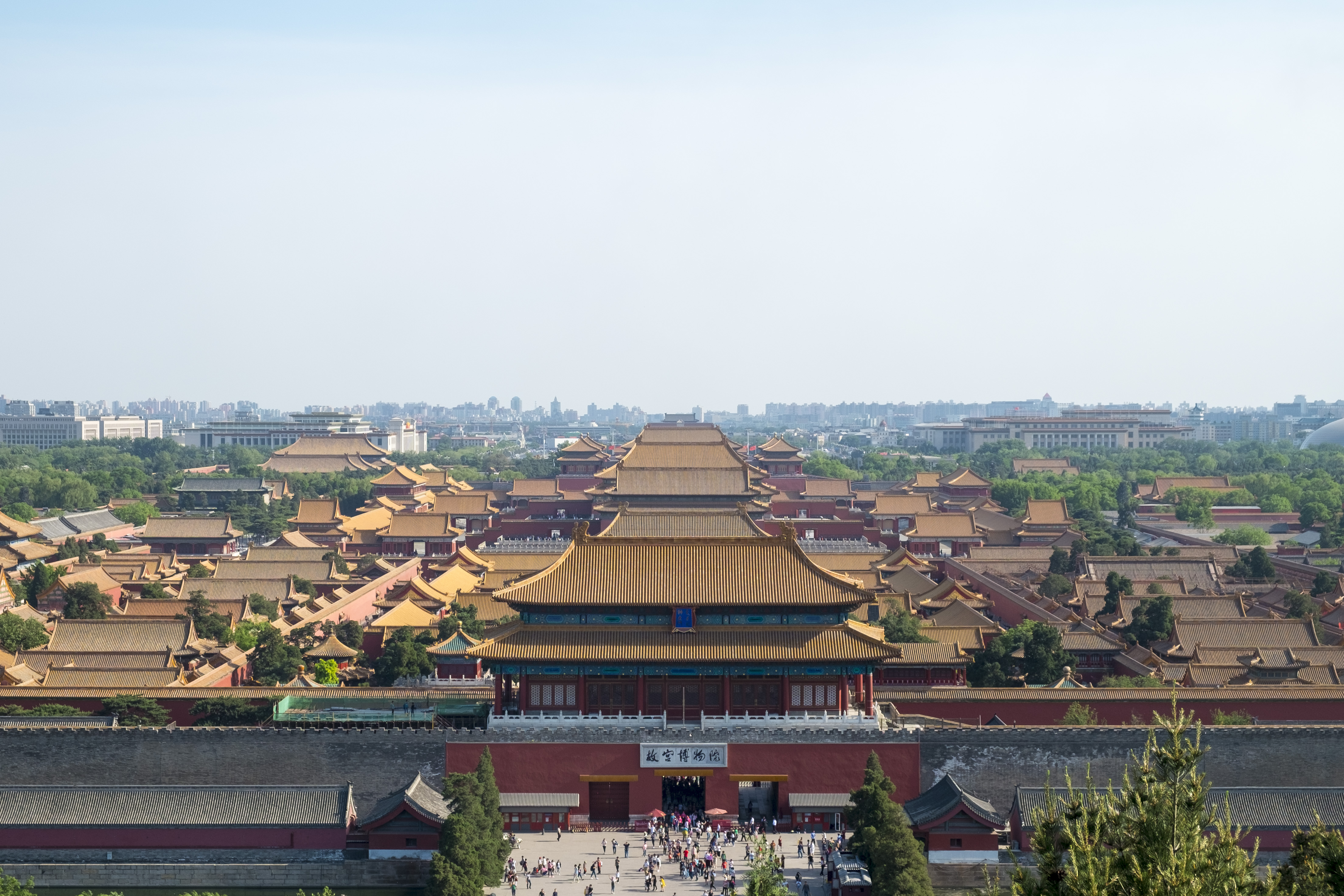
Forbidden City (故宫) overview

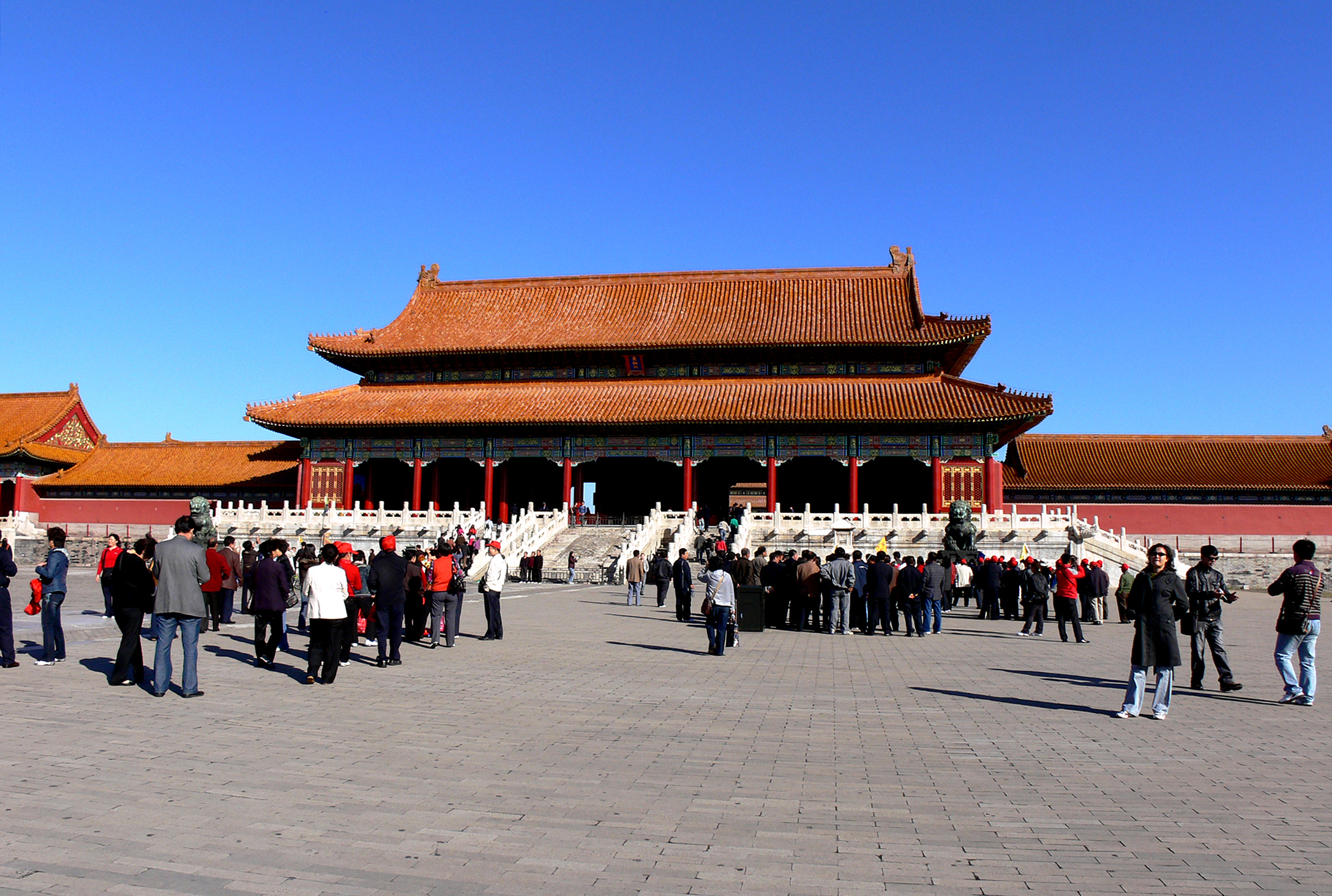
Gate of Supreme Harmony (太和门)

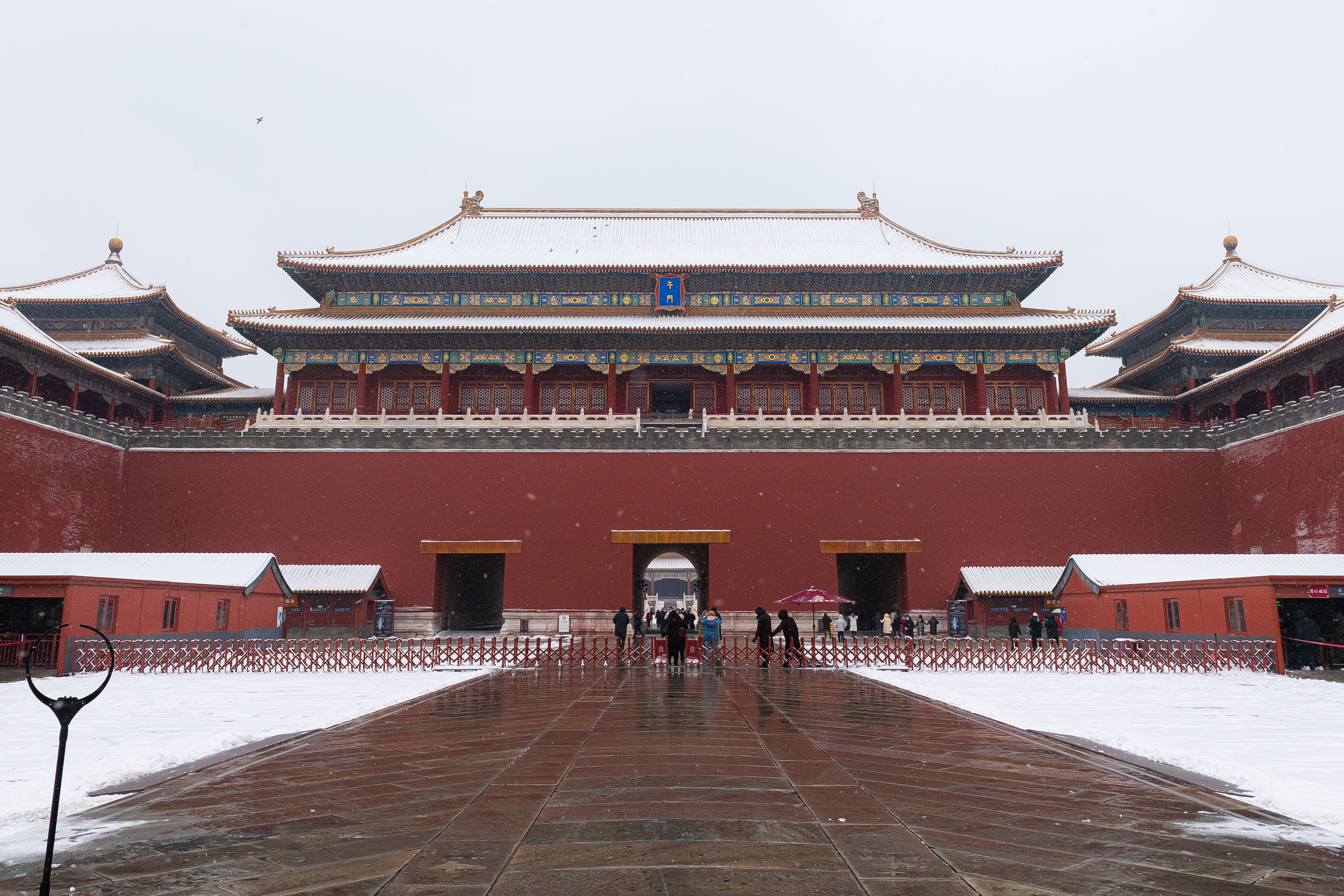
Meridian Gate (午门)

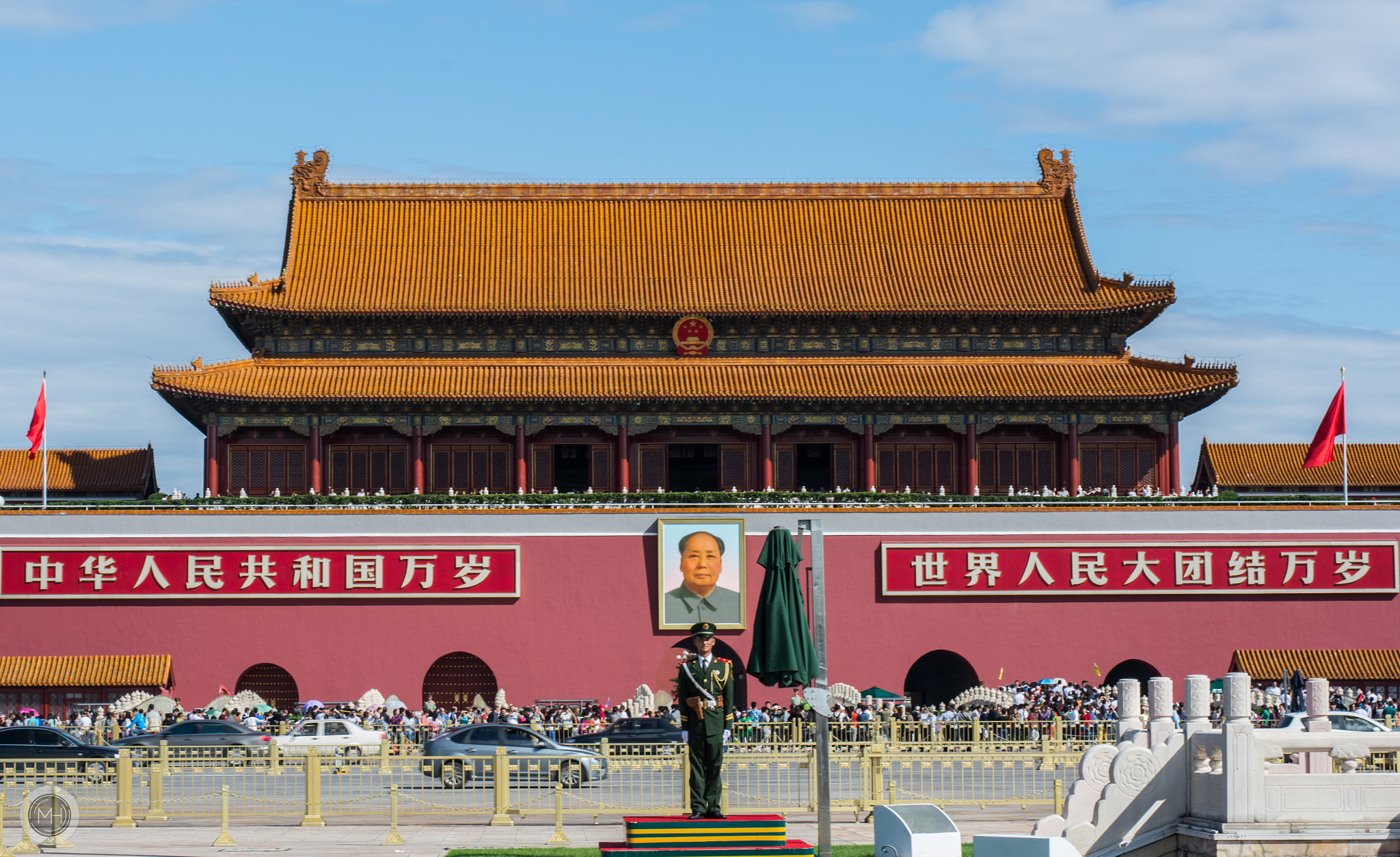
Tiananmen (天安门)

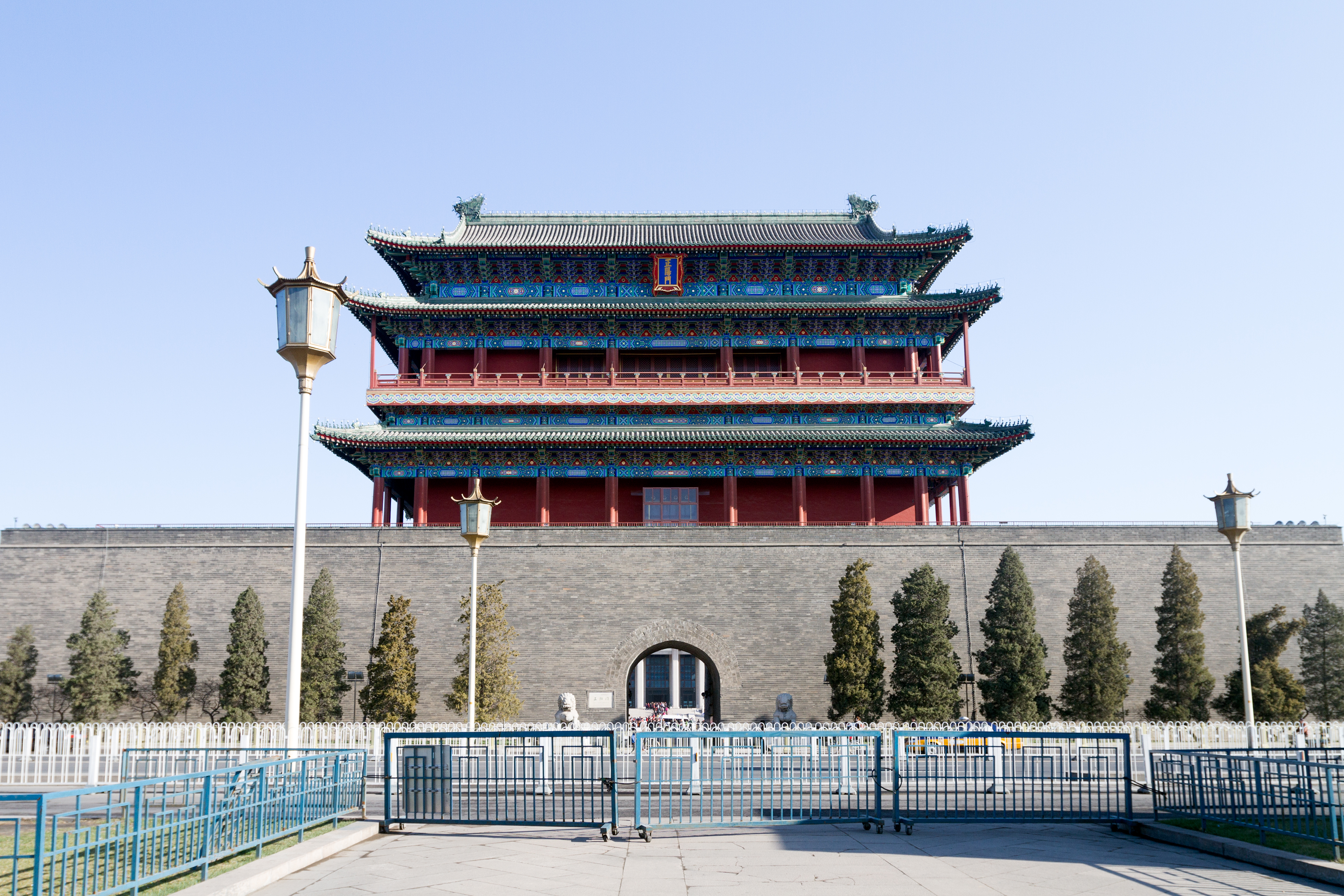
Zhengyangmen Gate tower (正阳门门楼)

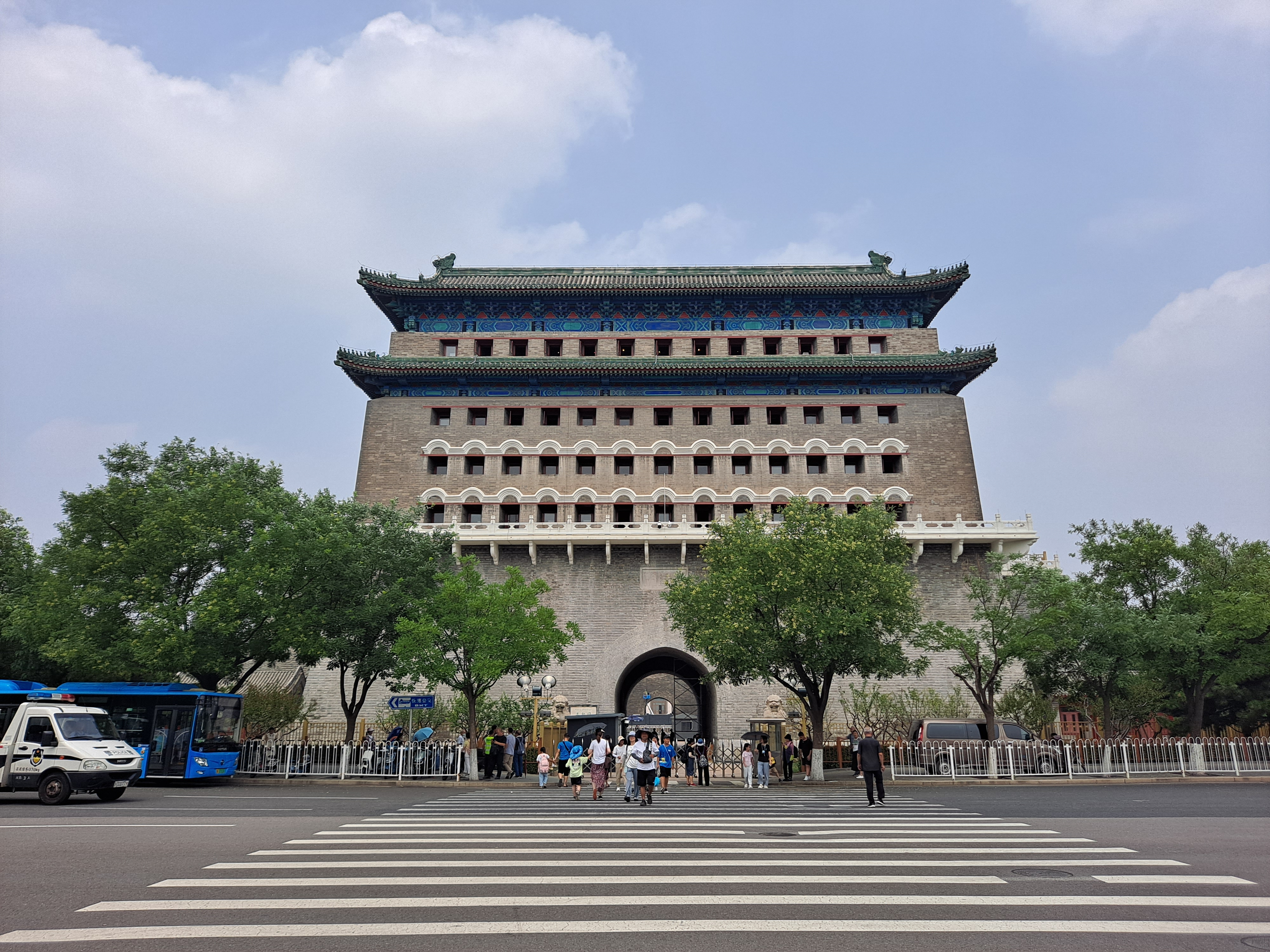
Zhengyangmen archery tower (正阳门箭楼)

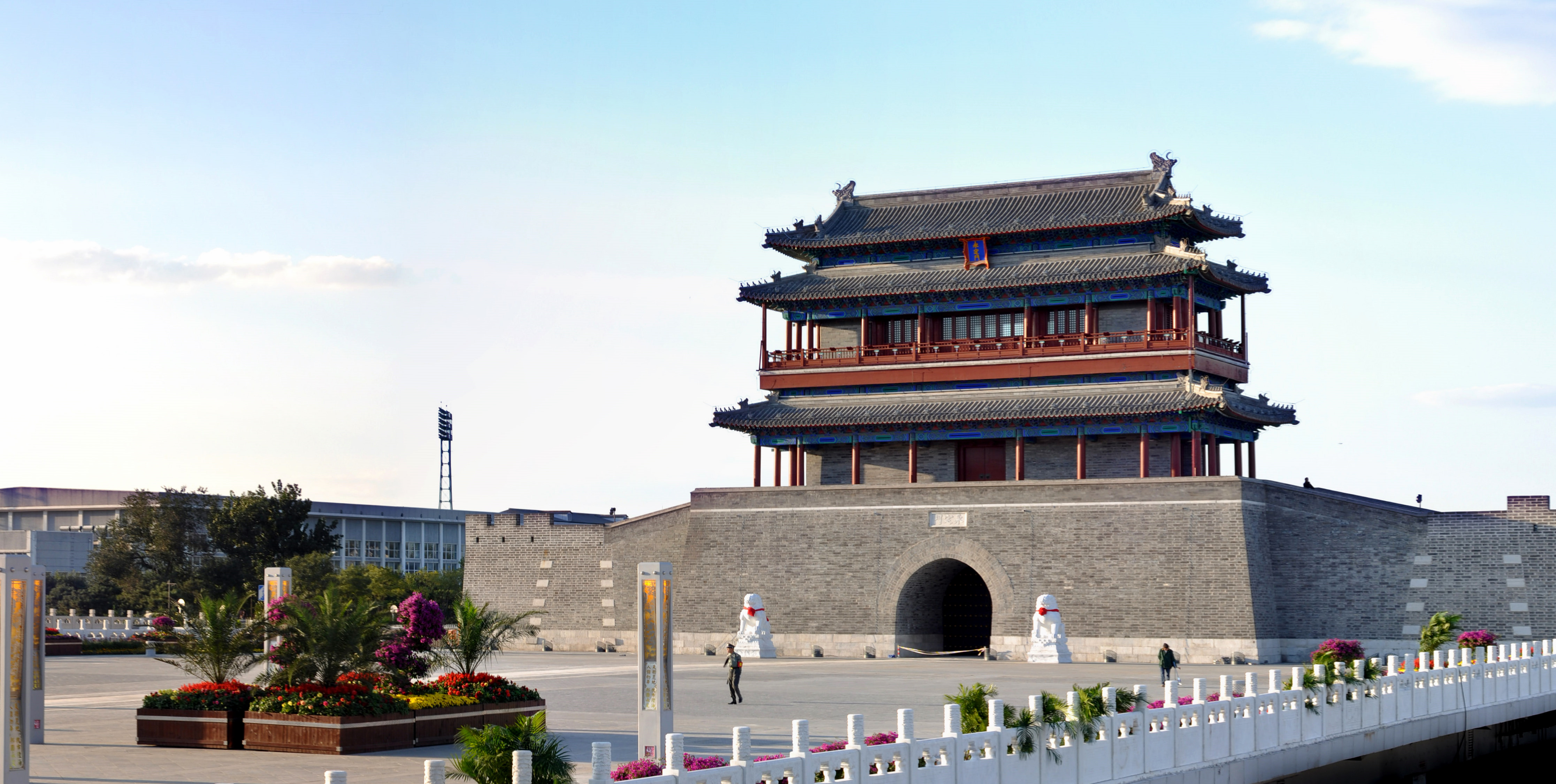
Yongdingmen (永定门)

== See also ==
- Axe historique – a similar axis in Paris.
- Cosmological Axis of Yogyakarta – a similar axis in Yogyakarta.
- Parliamentary Triangle, Canberra
