= Sun Yue (warlord) =

Chinese warlord (1878–1928)

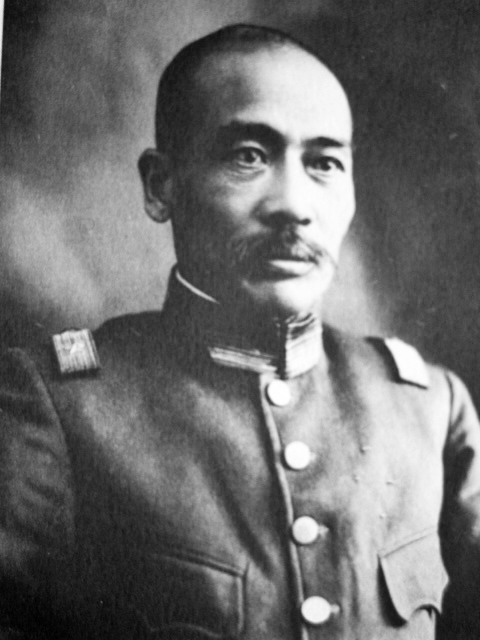
- Born: 1878; Gaoyang, Hebei
- Died: 1928 (aged 49–50); Shanghai

Sun Yue (Chinese: 孙岳; pinyin: Sūn Yuè; 1878–1928) was a Chinese warlord and member of the Guominjun and governor at various times of Hebei, Henan and Shaanxi.

== Life and career ==
Sun Yue was born in 1878 in Gaoyang, Hebei, China.

In 1903, he was admitted to the Baoding Beiyang Army Accelerated Arms School.

In 1904, he joined the Xingzhong Society and in the same year established the "Weekly Tea Party" in Chunshu Hutong, Baoding.

In 1905, he graduated from the Armed Forces Academy and served successively as artillery sentry officer of the Army's Third Town, third-class staff officer, etc.

In 1907, he entered Army University. In the same year, he established the Hebei (North China) branch of the Tongmenghui in Baoding Huoshen Temple to promote the slogan of "driving out the Tartars, restoring China, establishing the Republic of China, and equalizing land rights."

In 1909, he graduated from Army University and returned to No. 3 Town as a second-class staff officer and instructor. He met revolutionaries Bai Yayu, Wang Jinming, Shi Congyun, Feng Yuxiang and others, and organized a "Martial Arts Research Association" to plan an uprising.

In 1911, he served as the staff officer of the third town and the leader of the third battalion of the ninth standard.

In 1912, the Luanzhou Uprising failed, and Yuan Shikai issued an order to "kill Sun immediately." Sun Yue was wanted, so he disguised himself as a monk and went south to Ninghu to meet with Sun Yat-sen. Huang Xing reported on the revolutionary situation in the north.

Huang Xing appointed Sun Yue as the general staff of the Jiangbei Army. Later, Sun Yat-sen appointed Sun Yue as the commander of the Fifth Route Allied Forces in Yangzhen, Susongning. He participated in the First Northern Expedition and severely damaged Zhang Xun in northwest Jiangsu.

After the Qing emperor abdicated, Huang Xing appointed Sun Yuehe as the "special commissioner to investigate the mutiny in Beijing and Tianjin" to investigate the situation in the north. After the Nanjing Left-Behind Prefecture was established, Huang Xing entrusted Sun Yue as the commander of the 19th Army Division and garrisoned Qingjiangpu.

In 1913, Sun Yat-sen and Huang Xing launched the "Second Revolution" and invited Sun Yue to Shanghai.

On July 12, Li Liejun sent a message to attack Yuan Tong, Huang Xing was appointed commander-in-chief of the army to attack Yuan, and Sun Yue was appointed commander of the First Army of the Northern Expedition.

The "Second Revolution" failed, and Sun Yue was wanted by Yuan Shikai again and fled to Japan.

In 1914, Sun Yue returned to China, entered Shaanxi, and set up a "Gongxueyuan" at the foot of Mount Huashan to get acquainted with people with lofty ideals in the northwest, and jointly discussed the cause of Yuan Yuan, also known as "Huashan Juyi".

In 1915, Sun Yue returned to Zhili and went south to follow Mr. Sun Yat-sen.

In 1916, Yuan Shikai proclaimed himself emperor. Sun Yue and members of the "Huashan Juyi" organized a national defense team, crossed the Yellow River at night to attack Shanxi, and captured Ronghe, Yishi, Wanquan and other counties. They were blocked by the Jin army, and the team was separated. Sun Yue was wanted again and left Tongguan for Shanghai.

After Cao Kun was appointed governor of the Zhili Army, he appointed Sun Yue as the leader of the Caohe Officer Training Corps in Baoding.

In 1917, Zhang Xun was restored to power, and Sun Yue led his troops to Beijing to station in Fengtai and Changxindian areas to attack the braided army.

From 1918 to 1919, Sun Yue established contact with Cao Kun for Feng Yuxiang who was stationed in Wuxue.

In 1920, during the Zhili-Anhui War, Sun Yue served as the commander of the teaching regiment and concurrently as the commander of the Zhili Volunteer Army, and later as the commander of the 15th Mixed Brigade.

In 1922, during the first direct-to-Fengtian war, Sun Yue served as commander of the West Route Army and later as the garrison envoy of Daming.

On September 18, 1923, he was appointed "General Duanwei".

In 1924, Cao Kun bribed the president and prepared for "unification by force" with Wu Peifu, causing an uproar throughout the country. On September 10, Sun Yue and Feng Yuxiang made plans at Zhaozhong Temple in Nanyuan. Sun Yue contacted Shaanxi Army Hu Jingyi and others to plot to overthrow Cao and Wu. In late September, Feng Yuxiang drove to Shanhaiguan. Sun Yue was then the deputy commander of the Gyeonggi garrison and set up his headquarters at the Xianliang Temple in Dongcheng Xiaowei Camp. On October 21, when Feng Yuxiang and Hu Jingyi returned to Beijing and arrived at Andingmen for the first time, Sun Yue ordered the city gates to be opened to welcome them, surrounded the presidential palace, surrendered the weapons of the presidential guard, eliminated Wu Peifu's remaining troops, and cut off telegraph and telephone calls throughout the city. The Beijing coup was a success.

On October 24, Sun Yue, Feng Yuxiang, and Hu Jingyi jointly issued a call for peace, opposing the Zhili-Fengtian war, and inviting Mr. Sun Yat-sen to go north to preside over state affairs.

In November, Mr. Sun Yat-sen issued the "Declaration to Go North", specifically stating that the coup in Beijing "was initiated by the revolutionaries." Sun Yue defeated Cao Kun's elite troops in Baoding. After entering Baoding, he first released all the workers' leaders who were imprisoned during the "February 7th" strike in the twelfth year of the Republic of China. The Tianjin Office of the Beijing-Hankow Railway Federation of Trade Unions held a welcoming meeting and "unanimously advocated writing a letter to Deputy Commander Sun to express our gratitude." Publish a letter of thanks in a newspaper. Sun Yue led the National Army to fight Wu Peifu in Fengle Town. Together with the second army, they attacked Wu Peifu in Xinxiang and Zhangde, Henan. On December 5, Wu Peifu announced his defeat. On the 7th, Sun Yue occupied Kaifeng.

After Feng Yuxiang led his army to overthrow Cao Kun in the Beijing coup, Sun was made civil governor of Henan on 7 November 1924, a post he held until 29 August 1925. The following day he was made General in command of converting the Beijing gendarmerie into the Third Brigade of the Gominjun.

At the beginning of 1925, Sun Yue fought fiercely with Duan Qirui and Liu Zhenhua's troops in Zhensong. At the invitation of Yang Hucheng, he pursued Liu Zhenhua's troops in Shaanxi. On May 1, 1925, Sun Yue was awarded the rank of Army General by the Beijing government. In December 1925, the National Army occupied Tianjin and he served as the Military Supervisor and Governor of Zhili.

In February 1926, a military unit of the National Army moved to Zhizhong to guard Dagu Haikou. On March 10, the envoys of the eight countries protested to the Duan government. On March 12, two Japanese destroyers arrived at Dagukou from Lushun to cover the Fenglu Fleet. The Japanese army fired at the National Army, and the fort defenders fired back. The Dagukou Incident occurred. On March 13, the ministers of the eight countries jointly issued an ultimatum. On March 17, Peking University students gathered. On the same day, Sun Yue issued a "Warning Letter to the Japanese Government and Opposition" regarding the Dagukou incident, bitterly stated the Xinchou Treaty, and reiterated the conditions for the National Army to open Dagukou. On March 18, Li Dazhao led various groups to rally to oppose the Eight-Nation Spies and support the National Army defenders. After the meeting, there was a demonstration and petition, and the "March 18th" tragedy occurred. In May, the National Army retreated to Nankou. On September 17, he participated in the Wuyuan swearing-in ceremony. Accepting Li Dazhao's suggestion, "because Gansu aids Shaanxi and joins forces with Shanxi and Henan", he left Tongguan in the east, changed his name to the Second Group Army of the National Revolutionary Army, and participated in the Northern Expedition.

He next was made the Guominjun military governor of Shaanxi from 29 August 1925 to 25 December 1925. From that date Sun was made the Guominjun military and civil governor of Zhili until 21 March 1926. Lastly he was the Guominjun civil governor of Shaanxi from 11 April 1926 to October 1927, when the Gomunjun joined Chiang Kai-shek in the Northern Expedition, and he was replaced by Song Zheyuan as its first Chairman of the province.

In 1926, Sun Yue fell ill and went to Shanghai for medical treatment.

Sun died on 27 May 1928 in Shanghai.

In January 1928, the Nanjing National Government awarded Sun Yue the rank of Army General, and he was appointed as a member of the Military Commission of the National Government and served in the Privy Council.

The tomb of General Sun Yue is now in the Beijing Geriatric Hospital and is a Beijing municipal cultural relic.

== Sources ==
- Rulers: Chinese Administrative divisions, Hebei, Henan and Shaanxi
