= Gate of Correct Conduct =

- 贞度门
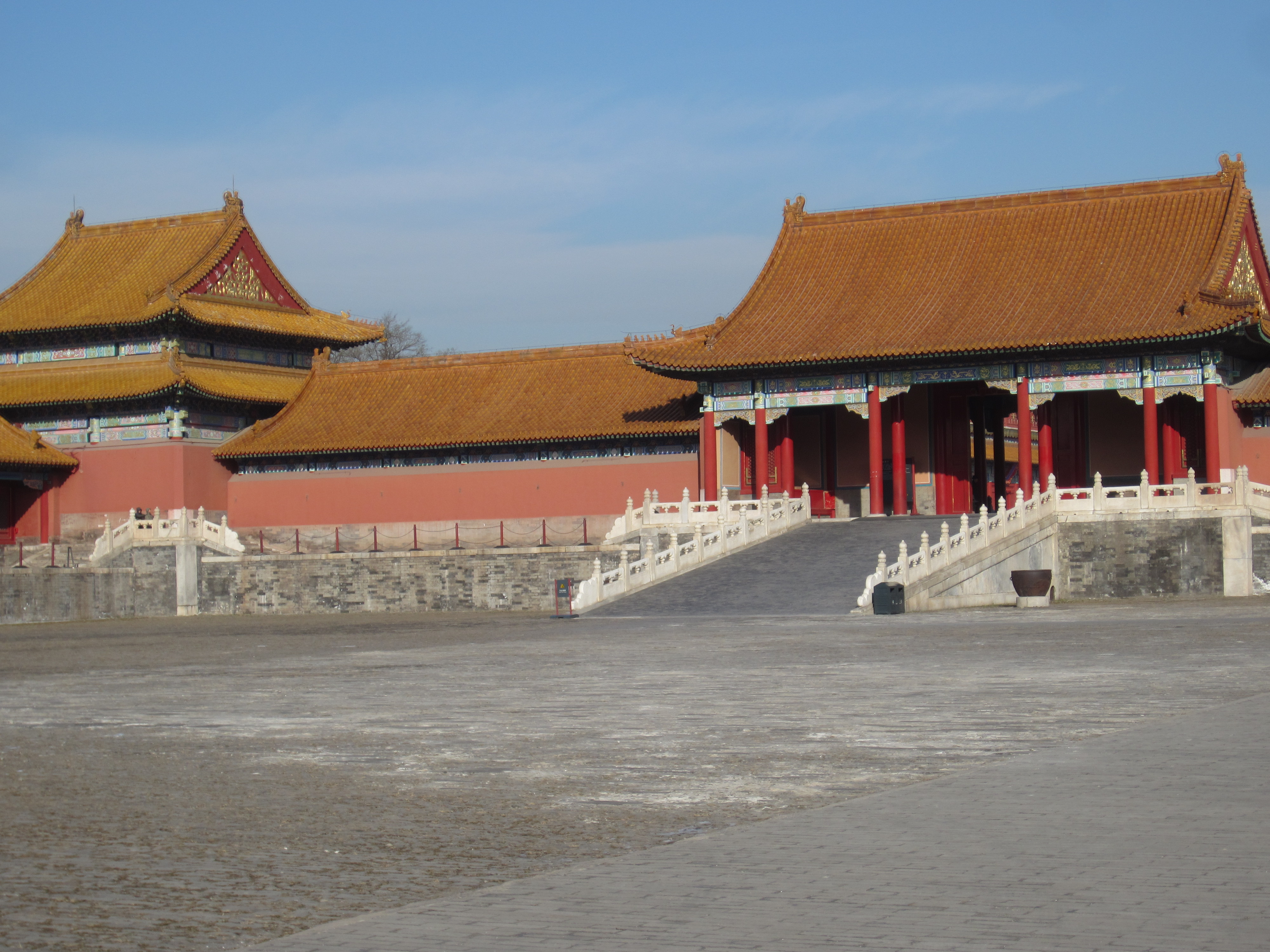
- The gate in 2016
- Former names: West Corner Gate
- Alternative names: Gate of Moral Standards, Zhendumen

General information
- Type: Gate

The Gate of Correct Conduct (simplified Chinese: 贞度门; traditional Chinese: 貞度門; Manchu: ᡨᠣᠪ
ᡩᠠᠰᠠᠨ ᡳ
ᡩᡠᡴᠠ tob dasan-i duka), or the Gate of Moral Standards, Zhendumen, is a gate on the west side of the Gate of Supreme Harmony. It was first built together with the Gate of Supreme Harmony and named West Corner Gate, and was later renamed the Gate of Proclaiming Governance (simplified Chinese: 宣治门; traditional Chinese: 宣治門) by the Jiajing Emperor in 1526. The fire destroyed the gate in the 14th year of Guangxu and was rebuilt the consecutive year. Its present-day name was given by the Qing Emperors.
