= Political Science Clique =

Political Science Clique 政學系
- Leader: Zhang Qun (Old); Huang Fu (New)
- Notable members: Weng Wenhao; Tsiang Tingfu; Chang Kia-ngau; Wang Shijie; Yang Yongtai
- Founded: 1920 (Old); 1926 (New)
- Dissolved: 1926 (Old); 1948 (New)
- Preceded by: Old Political Science Clique, European Studies Association
- Ideology: Three Principles of the People; Liberalism (Chinese); Chinese nationalism Technocracy
- Political position: Centre
- National affiliation: Kuomintang

Political Science Clique (Chinese: 政學系; pinyin: Zhèngxué xì), also known as the New Political Science Clique or the Department of Political Science, was a faction within the Kuomintang led by Zhang Qun. The faction consisted of various diplomats, bankers, bureaucrats, and scholars of the Republic of China. The clique represented the interests of the Chinese gentry and landowner class. It was also composed of the moderate and liberal wing of the Kuomintang who were committed to following Sun Yat-sen and the Three Principles of the People.

== History ==
In the early Beiyang government, the Political Science Clique was routed from Duan Qirui's inner circle who were additionally members of the Anfu Club. It had also been composed of the European Studies Association, which was a group of political scientists and scholars such as Chen Jiongming, Li Liejun, Xiong Kewu, and Chen Duxiu, some of whom had formed the association while in exile in Tokyo.

In 1926, Huang Fu, an early member of the Old Political Science Clique, was invited by Chiang Kai-shek during the Northern Expedition to put forward suggestions on a new system of government for China following the Kuomintang's full conquest of the Beiyang government. It was here in which he formed the New Political Science Clique with Zhang Qun, Yang Yongtai, Xiong Shihui, and Wu Tiecheng.

In 1936, following the assassination of Yang Yongtai and the death of Huang Fu, Zhang Qun emerged as the leader of the clique. The Political Science Clique would grow in power within the government with various members being appointed to positions within the cabinet. Zhang Qun himself served as Vice Premier and the Minister of Foreign Affairs in the late 30s and early 40s. During this time, Zhang continued to appeal towards a growing class of Chinese intellectuals within the Kuomintang who themselves disagreed with the Chinese Communist Party.

In 1946, Zhang Qun and various other members of the Political Science Clique were appointed to a commission George C. Marshall and Albert Coady Wedemeyer in their failed mission to create a coalition government in China between the Kuomintang and the CCP. In 1947, Zhang was also appointed as Premier of China but was said to have been ignored by Wedemeyer in their discussions.

== Downfall ==
In March 1947, the CC Clique led by brothers Chen Lifu and Chen Guofu attacked the Political Science Clique directly and the Chinese government, claiming "rampant corruption" and "low-efficiency of administration", chiefly aimed at Zhang Qun and his cabinet. The CC Clique has prior attacked the Political Science Clique in 1946 as a Kuomintang Central Committee meeting, claiming the clique had "sold out the country and its people."

In 1948, Zhang Qun resigned from his position as premier, enabling the downfall of the clique's influence in China. Following this, various other members such as Chang Kia-ngau resigned from their high-level bureaucratic positions in government.
