= Guominjun =

Military faction during China's Warlord Era

Guominjun Kuominchun
- 國民軍
- Left: The Beiyang Star was used as the emblem prior to 1926. Right: The Blue Sky and White Sun became the emblem after 1926.
- Founders: Feng Yuxiang; Hu Jingyi; Sun Yue
- Leaders: Feng Yuxiang; Hu Jingyi; Sun Yue
- Country: Republic of China
- Allegiance: Kuomintang
- Headquarters: Shaanxi
- Active regions: Northern Republic of China
- Ideology: Chinese nationalism; Anti-imperialism; Christian socialism; Three Principles of the People (partially); Christianity with Chinese characteristics; Pro-Sovietism
- Wars: the Warlord Era

Guominjun
- Traditional Chinese: 國民軍
- Simplified Chinese: 国民军
- Literal meaning: National People's Army
Transcriptions
Standard Mandarin
- Hanyu Pinyin: Guómínjūn
- Wade–Giles: Kuo^{2}-min^{2}-chün^{1}

The Guominjun (GMC), also known as the Kuominchun (KMC), was a military faction founded by Feng Yuxiang, Hu Jingyi and Sun Yue during China's Warlord Era. It had control of much of Northwestern China, including Shaanxi, Chahar and Suiyuan, hence its other name, the Northwest Army (西北軍; not to be confused with the later army of the same name under Yang Hucheng).

== History ==
The Guominjun was formed when Feng betrayed the Zhili clique during the Second Zhili–Fengtian War with the Fengtian clique in 1924. The Guominjun occupied Beijing, captured Zhili leader Cao Kun and expelled former Qing dynasty emperor Puyi from the Forbidden City.

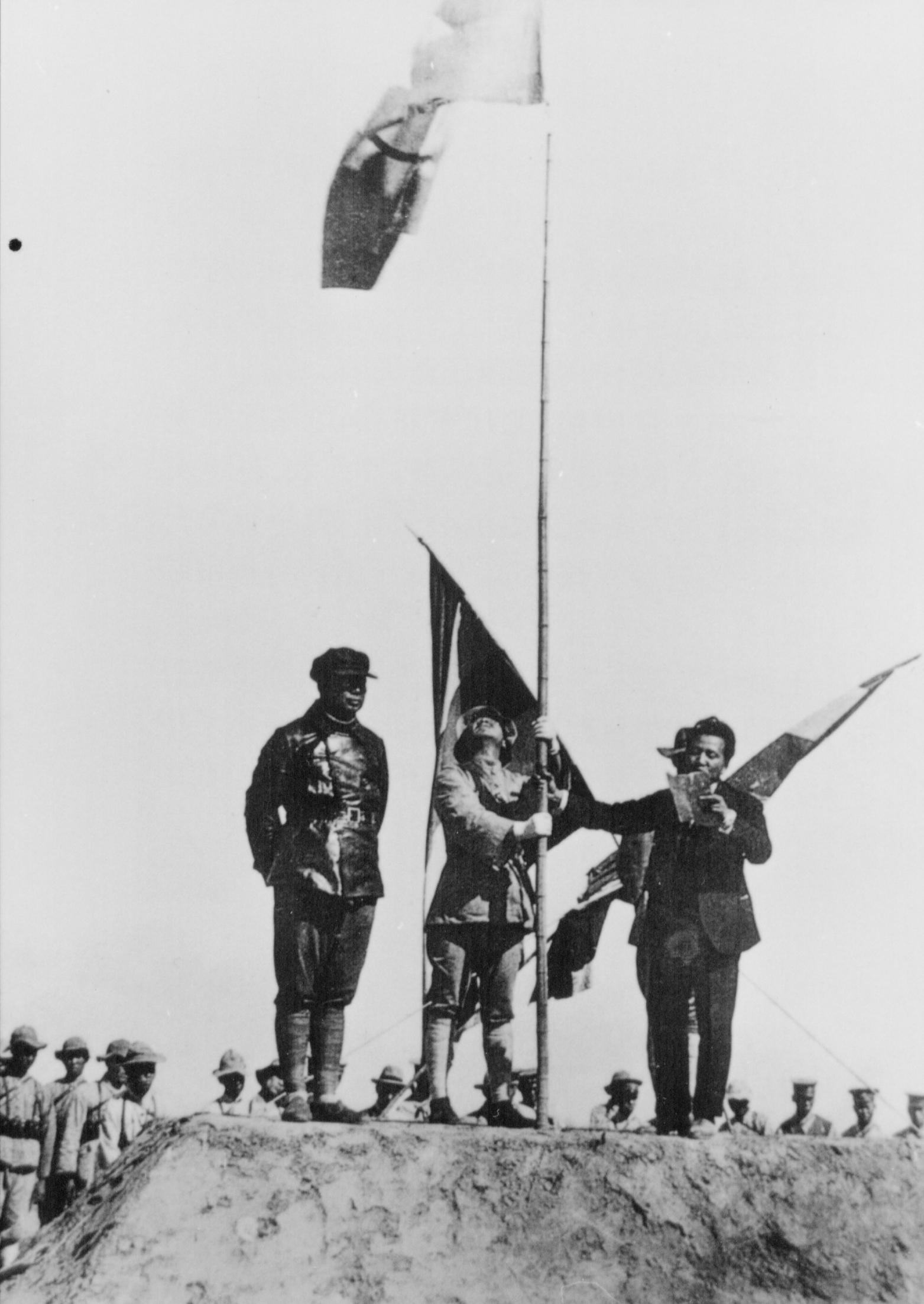
Guominjun allied with the Kuomintang after 17 September 1926

In late 1925, Fengtian general Guo Songling defected to the KMC; this sparked the Anti-Fengtian War against Zhang Zuolin.

The Guominjun was incorporated into the Kuomintang's National Revolutionary Army as the "Second Collective Army" in 1928 during the Northern Expedition, and fought alongside the KMT to defeat Fengtian forces (National Pacification Army) and capture Beijing.

In 1929, Feng grew increasingly dissatisfied with Chiang Kai-shek's regime; the Guominjun launched a full rebellion with Yan Xishan and Li Zongren's army, the Central Plains War, in 1930. However, Feng was defeated and what was left of the faction was absorbed into the KMT.

== Ideology ==
The Guominjun was very sympathetic to Sun Yat-sen's Kuomintang government in Guangzhou, but due to geographic isolation they were independent of one another. The Guominjun was unusual for being an ideological army with its troops indoctrinated in Christian, socialist, and nationalist teachings. It also cared for its troops with welfare and education programs which was very rare at the time. This created a very determined, cohesive fighting force with high morale. The Guominjun's main foreign backer was the Soviet Union which had vied with the Empire of Japan for influence over the Fengtian clique. The Soviets were keen on building a relationship with Feng as he was seen as more ideologically acceptable. However, despite Feng's portrayal by outsiders as sympathizer of communism, and his claims to be an adherent of Sun Yat-sen's left-leaning teachings, the Guominjun was not a leftist army. It was primarily a nationalist force which was also reflected in Feng's adoption of only those elements of socialism and Christianity which he considered useful to improve Chinese society and strengthen his troops' morale.

== See also ==
- History of the Republic of China
- List of warlords and military cliques in the Warlord Era

== Bibliography ==
- Jordan, Donald A. (1976). The Northern Expedition: China's National Revolution of 1926–1928. Honolulu: University Press of Hawaii. ISBN 9780824803520.
- Sheridan, James E. (1966). Chinese Warlord. The Career of Feng Yü-hsiang. Stanford, California: Stanford University Press.
