= Sun Yu =

Sun Yu is the name of:

- Sun Yu (Han dynasty) (177–215), cousin of the warlord Sun Quan during the late Han dynasty
- Sun Yu (director) (1900–1990), Chinese film director
- Sun Yu (badminton) (born 1994), Chinese badminton player

== See also ==
- Sun Yue (disambiguation)
