= Drum Tower and Bell Tower of Beijing =

Historic building complex in China

Coordinates: 39°56′24.68″N 116°23′22.69″E

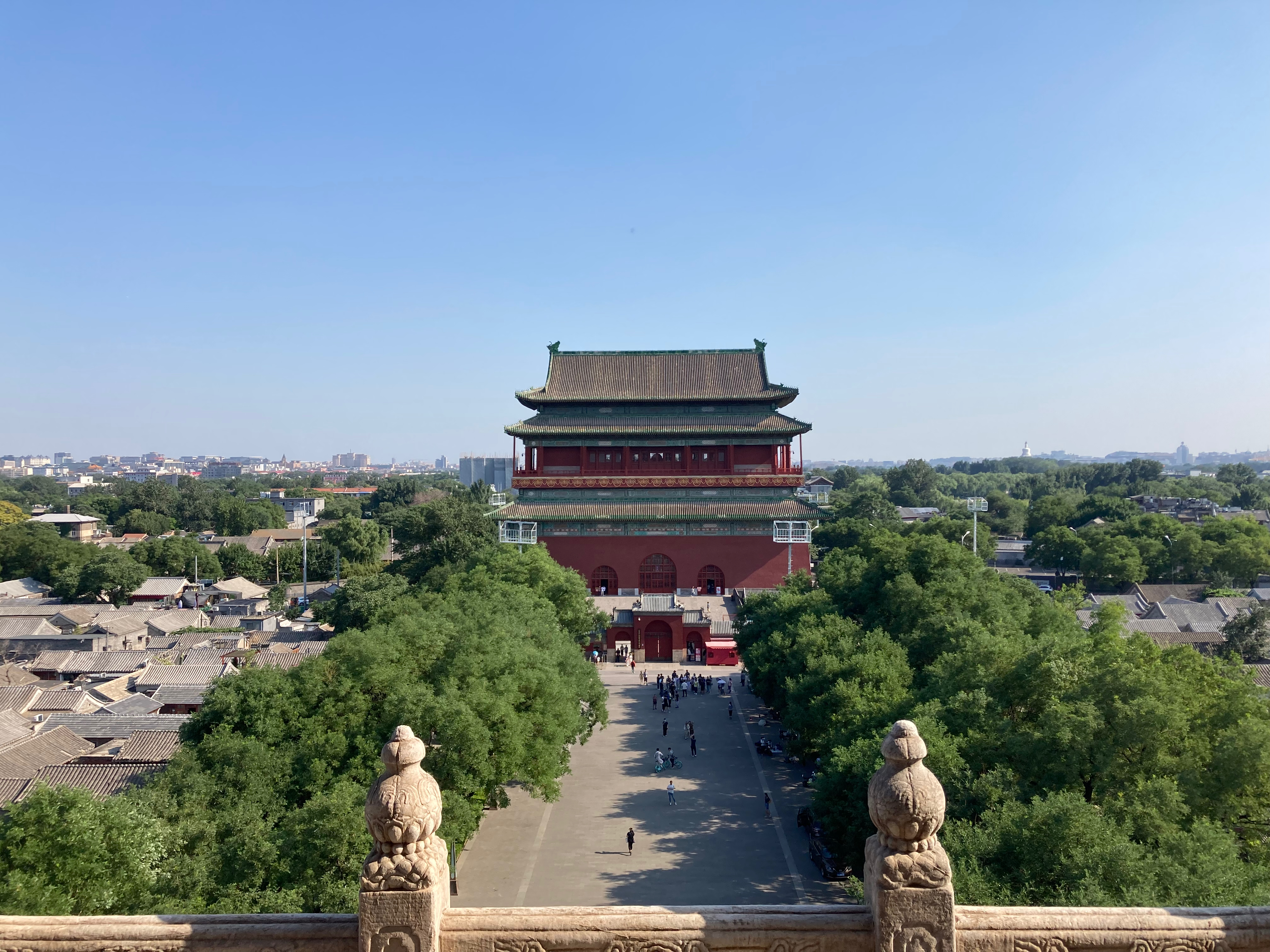
The Drum Tower, as seen from the Bell Tower at its rear

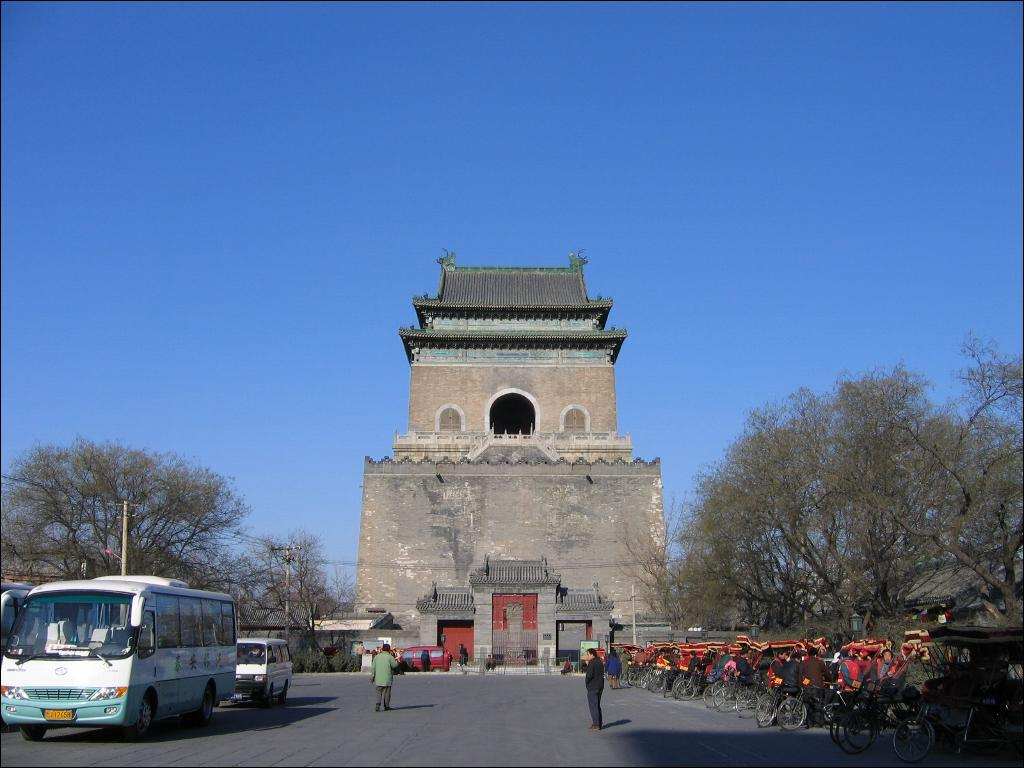
The Bell Tower

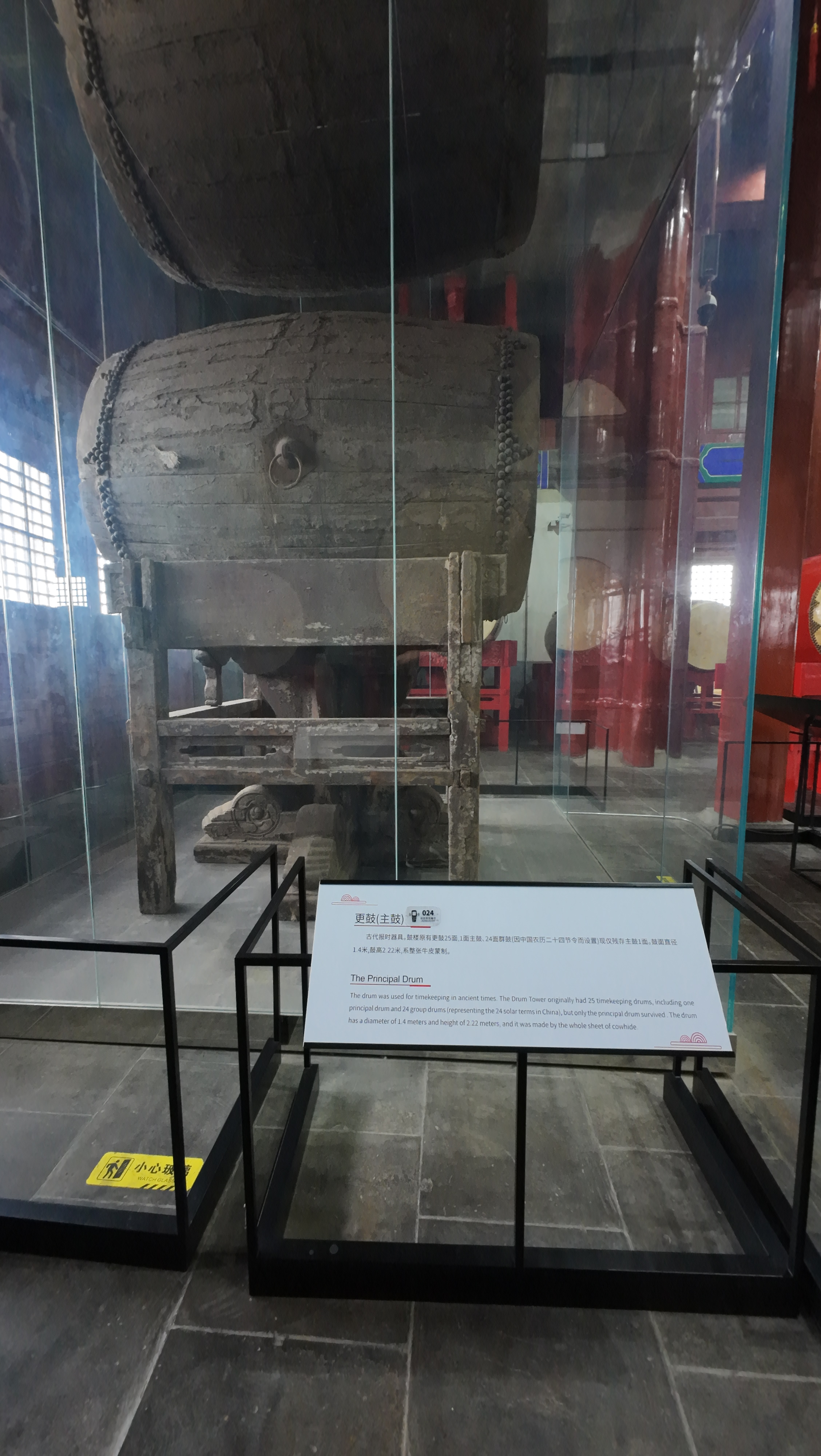
Principal drum in the Drum Tower. Out of the original 25 drums, this is the only remaining one.

The Drum Tower of Beijing, or Gulou (traditional Chinese: 鼓樓; simplified Chinese: 鼓楼; pinyin: Gǔlóu), is situated at the northern end of the central axis of the Inner City to the north of Di'anmen Street. Originally built for musical reasons, it was later used to announce the time and is now a tourist attraction.

The Bell Tower of Beijing, or Zhonglou (traditional Chinese: 鐘樓; simplified Chinese: 钟楼; pinyin: Zhōnglóu), stands closely behind the drum tower. Together, the Bell Tower and Drum Tower have panoramic views over central Beijing. Before the modern era, both towers dominated the Beijing skyline.

== Function ==
Both bells and drums were used as musical instruments in ancient China. Later, they were used by government and communities to announce the time. The Bell and Drum Towers were central to official timekeeping in China during the Yuan, Ming, and Qing dynasties.

The Bell and Drum Towers continued to function as the official timepiece of Beijing until 1924. That year, the Beijing Coup led to the expulsion of Puyi, the last emperor of the Qing Dynasty, from the Forbidden City, and the adoption of Western-style clocks for official time-keeping.

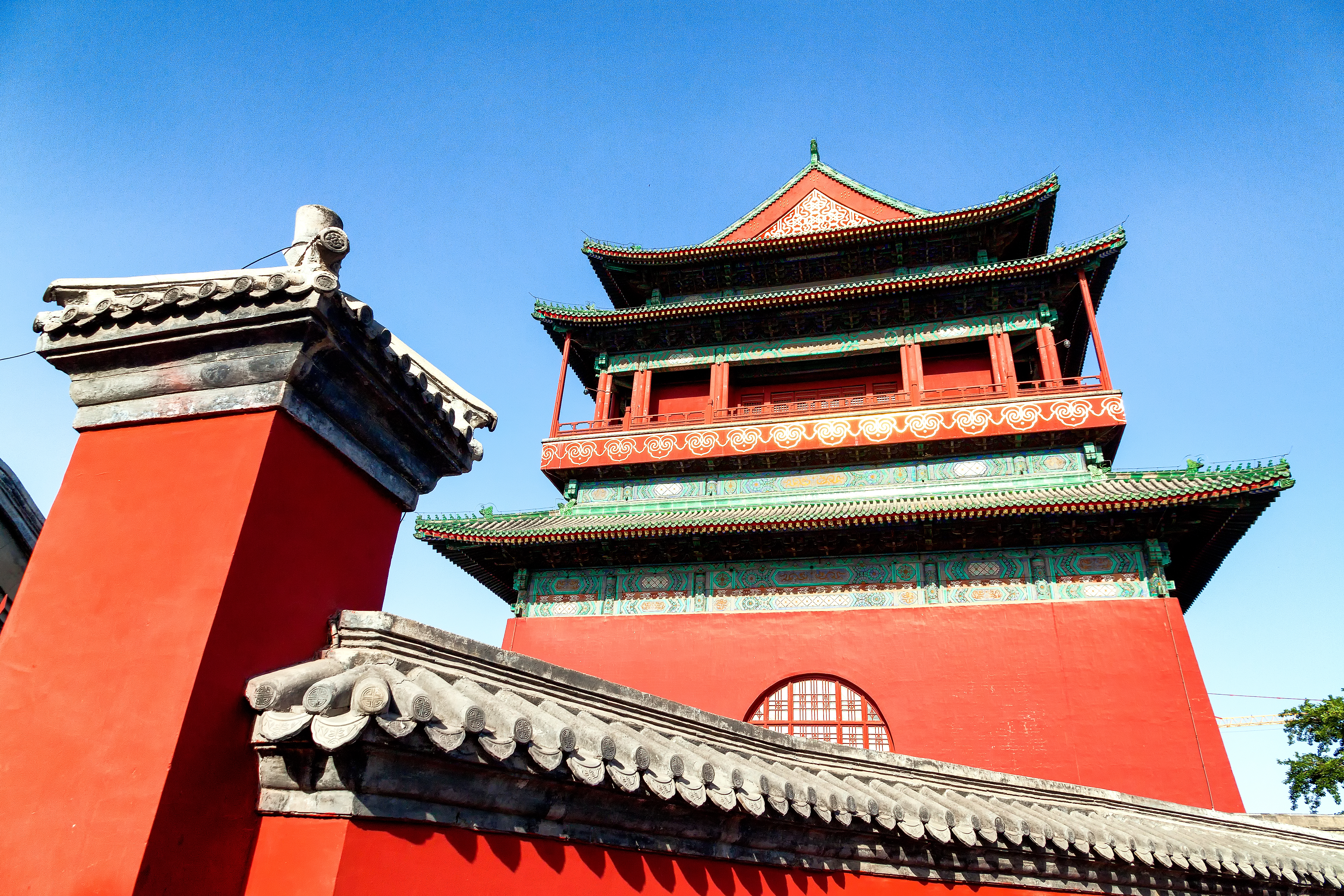
The Drum Tower seen from the road

Performance at the Drum Tower

== History ==
The Drum Tower was built in 1272 during the Yuan dynasty. At that time the city was called Khanbaliq and the tower was named the Tower of Orderly Administration (Chinese: 齐政楼; pinyin: Qízhènglóu). The name symbolizes what were known as the comprising elements of the universe in ancient China, including metal, wood, water, fire, earth, the sun and the moon. In 1420, during the reign of the Yongle Emperor, the building was rebuilt to the east of its original site. The Qing dynasty carried out important renovations in 1800. Following the Beijing Coup in 1924, Feng Yuxiang removed the official status of the towers, replacing them with Western time-keeping methods, and renamed the building as the Tower of Clarifying Shame (Chinese: 明耻楼; pinyin: Míngchǐlóu). Objects related to the Eight-Nation Alliance's invasion of Beijing and later the May 30 Massacre of 1925 were put on display, turning the towers into a museum. The upper story of the Drum Tower currently serves as the People's Cultural Hall of the Dongcheng District.

In the 1980s, after much repair work, the Bell and Drum Towers were opened to tourists.

During the 2008 Summer Olympics, held in Beijing, three people were stabbed at the Drum Tower, resulting in one death.

== Architecture ==
The Drum Tower is a 47-meter (154 ft)-tall two-story building made of wood. The upper story of the building housed one main drum and 24 smaller drums, of which only the main drum remains. New drums have been made to replace them. Nearby stands the Bell Tower, a 33-meter (108 ft)-tall edifice with gray walls and a green glazed roof.

== See also ==
- Imperial City, Beijing
