= Yang Yongtai =

Governor of Hubei
- In office 27 December 1935 – 25 October 1936

Personal details
- Born: 1880 Gaozhou, Guangdong
- Died: 25 October 1936 (age 55-56) Hankou (Wuhan), Hubei
- Manner of death: Assassination
- Party: Kuomintang
- Education: Guangdong Guangya High School

Yang Yongtai (simplified Chinese: 杨永泰; traditional Chinese: 楊永泰; 1880 – October 25, 1936) was a Kuomintang politician of the Republic of China. He was appointed governor of Hubei Province in 1935, but was assassinated the next year.

== Career ==
Yang in 1913

Yang was born in Gaozhou Guangdong Province during the Qing dynasty. He was a xiucai (Imperial examination student member). After finishing his education in Beijing, Yang edited a newspaper in Guangzhou called Guangnan.

He joined the Kuomintang in 1912, after the Xinhai Revolution toppled the Qing empire and created the Republic of China. In 1913, he attended the 1st party congress of the Kuomintang as a delegate. In 1914, after Yuan Shikai dissolved China's parliament and expelled its Kuomintang members, Yang and Huang Xing published a magazine in Shanghai voicing their opposition to Yuan's ambitions to become emperor. From 1917 until 1920, Yang was finance minister of the government of the Constitutional Protection Movement, centered in Guangdong Province. In June 1922, Yang went to Beijing to seek reconciliation between the Kuomintang and the Beiyang government, but after Cao Kun's seizure of the presidency in 1923, he ended those efforts in opposition to Cao. After a conference in 1925, Yang was confirmed as deputy party secretary of the finance ministry. In 1927, with the formation of the Nationalist Government in Nanjing under Chiang Kai-shek, he formed the Political Science Clique with Zhang Qun, Wang Ch'ung-hui and Chang Kia-ngau. In 1931, he received an appointment as secretary of military affairs. In 1933, he went to Nanchang to oversee its military affairs. In 1934, he was given full authority over the military affairs of Henan, Anhui and Hubei Provinces, headquartered in Wuchang. He oversaw the campaigns against the forces of the Chinese Workers' and Peasants' Red Army present in those provinces. In late 1935, he was made governor of Hubei and assassinated later that year in Hankou. The assassin was sponsored by a political rival in the CC Clique.

== Bibliography ==
- H. J. Van Derven. Warfare in Chinese History.
- Hans J. Van de Ven. War and Nationalism in China, 1925–1945.
- Marjorie Dryburgh. North China and Japanese Expansion 1933-1937: Regional Power and the.
- Alan Baumler. Chinese and Opium under the Republic, The: Worse than Floods and Wild Beasts.
