= Huang Fu =

Chinese politician

- 黃郛
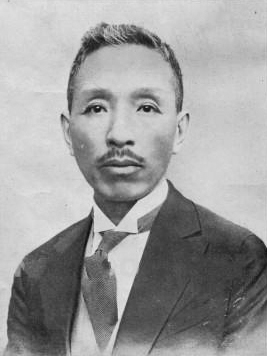

Acting President of China
- In office 2 November 1924 – 24 November 1924
- Premier: Himself (acting)
- Preceded by: Cao Kun
- Succeeded by: Duan Qirui (acting)

Acting Premier of China
- In office 31 October 1924 – 24 November 1924
- President: Cao Kun; Himself (acting)
- Preceded by: Yan Huiqing
- Succeeded by: office abolished (Xu Shiying in 1925)

Personal details
- Born: 8 March 1883 Shangyu, Zhejiang, China
- Died: 6 December 1936 (aged 53) Shanghai, China
- Party: Kuomintang (Political Science Clique)
- Education: Zhejiang Military College and Qiushi Academy
- Awards: Order of the Precious Brilliant Golden Grain

Huang Fu (simplified Chinese: 黄郛; traditional Chinese: 黃郛; pinyin: Huáng Fú; Wade–Giles: Huang Fu) (8 March 1883 – 6 December 1936) was a general and politician in early Republic of China.

== Biography ==
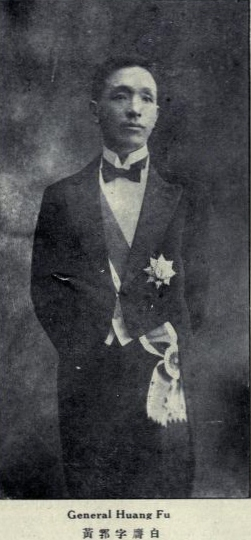
Huang Fu

Huang studied at Zhejiang Military College and Qiushi Academy (current Zhejiang University), later was sent to Japan in 1904. Huang came in contact with the Tongmenghui while studying at the Tokyo Shinbu Gakko, a military academy in Tokyo in 1905 and met Chiang Kai-shek and Zhang Qun in 1907 when they arrived to study in Japan as well. In 1908, he studied surveying under the Imperial Japanese Army, and returned to China in 1910. During the 1911 Xinhai Revolution, he and Chen Qimei declared Shanghai to be independent of the Empire of China, and became blood brothers with Chiang Kai-shek.

He was forced to flee abroad after the failed Second Revolution of 1913 against Yuan Shikai, travelling via Japan to the United States, and returned in 1916 to participate in the final stages of the National Protection War, and to represent Zhejiang's military government in Beijing. When Sun Yat-sen ordered Kuomintang members to swear personal loyalty to him, Huang objected and left politics.

Huang reappeared into public life by supporting China's entry into World War I hoping it would regain lost territories. He worked with President Xu Shichang as a diplomat, co-wrote books about economics and foreign affairs and would often guest lecturer at universities. He was part of China's delegation to the 1921 Washington Naval Conference which secured the Beiyang government's greatest diplomatic triumph, the return of Shandong.

After the fall of Cao Kun in the 1924 Beijing Coup, he supported Feng Yuxiang and became acting president of China on his request. He declared Cao Kun's term illegal because it was obtained through bribery and also repudiated the agreement which allowed former Emperor Puyi to continue to live in the Forbidden City.

Huang was influential in winning over Feng Yuxiang and Yan Xishan to Chiang Kai-shek's faction of the Kuomintang (KMT) which was one of the major reasons why Wang Jingwei's Wuhan regime collapsed. He later served under several offices during the Nanjing decade including Shanghai mayor, foreign minister, and chairman of the North China Political Council. In 1933, he signed the unpopular Tanggu Truce which ceded Chahar, Rehe, and part of Hebei to Manchukuo. Like Chiang, he viewed the Communists as a greater threat than the Japanese.

Huang died of lung cancer in Shanghai in 1936.

== Notes ==
Political offices
Preceded by Cao Kun	Acting President of China; 1924	Succeeded by Duan Qirui
Preceded by Yan Huiqing	Premier of China; 1924	Succeeded by Xu Shiying
