= 1922 Baoding plane crash =

1922 aviation accident in China

Accident
- Date: 31 March 1922
- Summary: Crashed during landing
- Site: near Baoding Airport, Baoding, Republic of China

Aircraft
- Aircraft type: Handley Page aircraft
- Operator: Baoding Air Force
- Flight origin: Baoding Airport
- Destination: Baoding Airport
- Occupants: 14
- Fatalities: 14
- Survivors: 0

On 31 March 1922, a Baoding Air Force Handley Page passenger aircraft conducting a test flight crashed while attempting to land back at Baoding Airport, Baoding, Zhili, Republic of China. Having descended too low, the aircraft clipped trees and crashed into the ground, bursting into flames, killing all 14 occupants on board the aircraft.

The flight took place on the final day of a three-day test flight tour conducted in Baoding to develop civil aviation in China. The crash was China's first civil aviation accident and resulted in the Baoding Air Force being banned from carrying passengers during training flights.

== Background ==
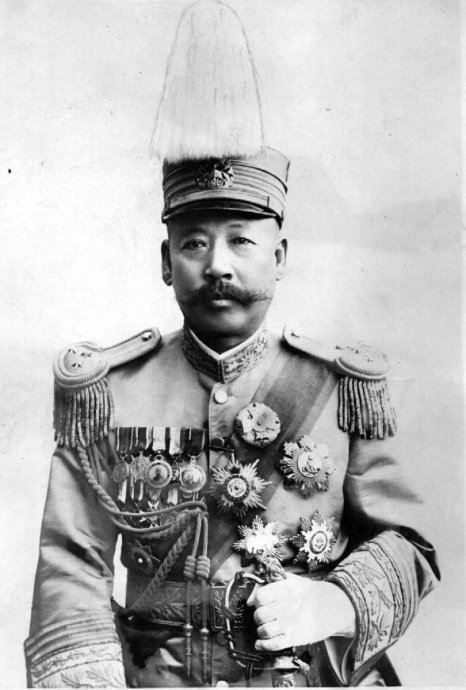
Cao Kun

On 1 November 1921, Zhili clique warlords founded the Baoding Air Force using aircraft salvaged from Beijing. The pilots were trained using the Air Force's three remaining Handley Page aircraft. In spring 1922, Cao Kun established the jīng hàn hángkōng xiàn chóubèi chù (京漢航空線籌備處; "Beijing-Hankou Air Line Preparatory Office"), under the pretext of "developing civil aviation". As such, to improve publicity and expand its influence, from 29 to 31 March, a Handley Page passenger aircraft would be used to conduct a test flight tour in Baoding. During the three-day tour, the flight carried personnel from government agencies in Baoding, military units, and organizations. The first two days of the tour were uneventful.

From November 1921 until 31 March 1922, according to historical records from the Republic of China, there were no fatal aviation accidents at Baoding Airport.

== Accident ==
On 31 March 1922, the aircraft was conducting a test flight with 14 occupants on board: pilot-in-command Ma Yufang (馬毓芳), pilots Ma Guishan (馬桂山) and Tian Zhaolin (田兆霖), chief flight engineer Wu Yongzhong (武永忠) and engineer Zhai Fengming (翟鳳鳴), 23rd Division company commander Xu Yi (徐毅), platoon leaders Wang Shaozhou (王紹舟), Liu Guoyuan (劉國垣), Bian Dexian (邊德顯), and Zhang Boling (張伯齡), quartermaster Liang Fangji (梁芳霽), dispatchers Wang Zhi (王智) and Bao Wenwei (鮑文偉), and officer training cadet Yang Jiayou (楊嘉佑). Ma Yufang was a pilot for the Baoding Air Force, having graduated from the second class of the Nanyuan Aviation School. At 10:20 am, while attempting to return to Baoding Airport, the aircraft flew at a low approach altitude, causing its tail to strike treetops at Wulipu, northeast of the airport which resulted in the plane crashing into the ground and bursting into flames. It took firefighters more than an hour to extinguish the fire. All 14 occupants on board the aircraft were killed and the aircraft was destroyed.

== Aftermath ==
The crash was the first accident involving a Chinese civilian aircraft. Having learned of the crash, Cao Kun was shocked. Feeling that "the aviation force, as a war tool, was not a good tool," he ordered the improvement of safety regarding flight training and stressed that other people were no longer allowed on board training flights. As such, due to the large number of casualties, the Baoding Air Force was prohibited from carrying passengers during training flights.
