= 1924 Beijing Coup =

1924 coup d'état in China

Beijing Coup 北京政變
- Part of the Warlord Era
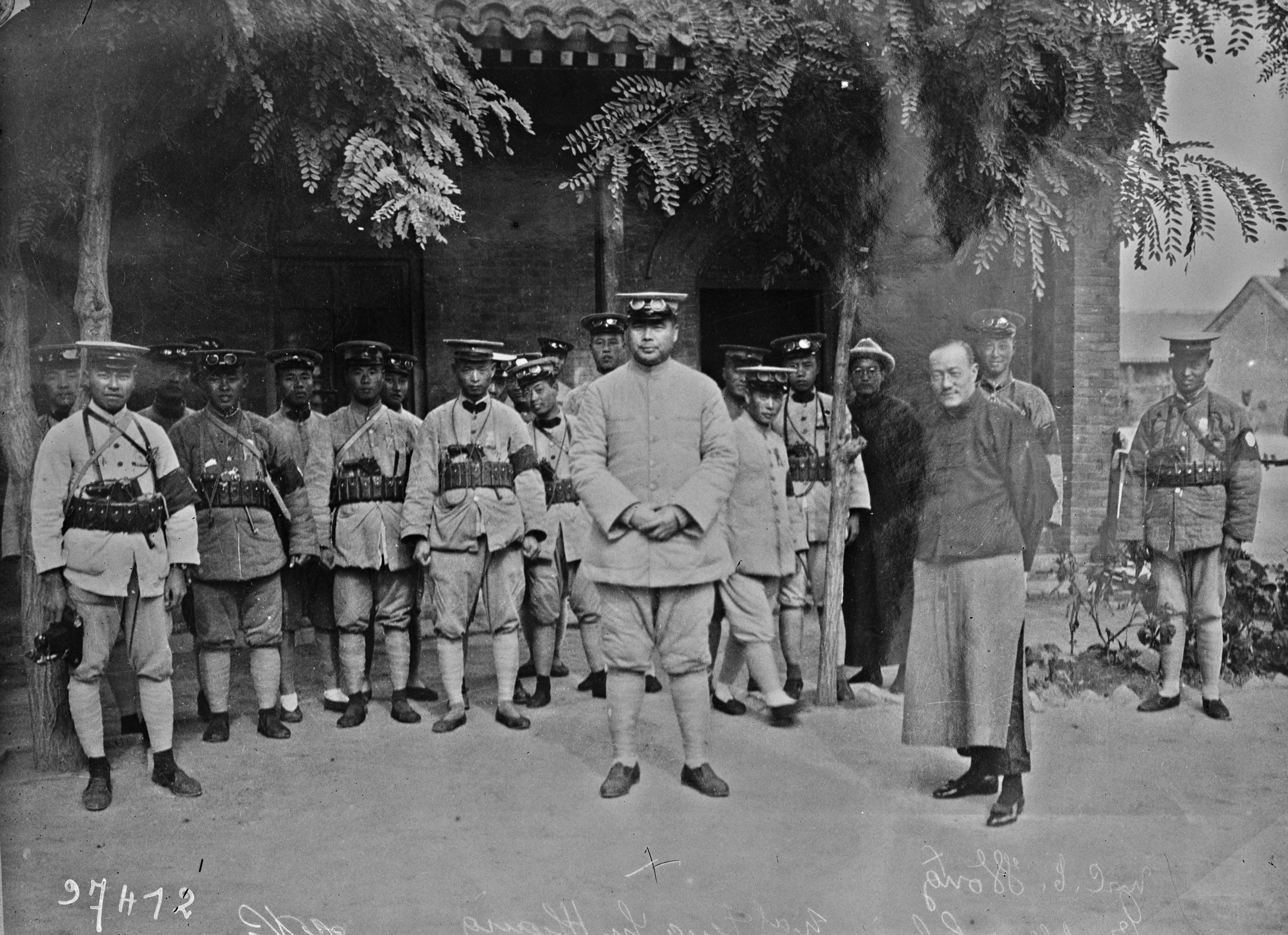
- Feng Yuxiang (center) during the coup
- Date: October 1924
- Location: Beijing
- Caused by: Feng Yuxiang's desire to overthrow Wu Peifu; pro-Japanese interests and conspiracies of the Anhui clique; Japanese plans against Wu Peifu
- Result: Cao Kun removed as president Allowed the pro-Japanese Fengtian clique to defeat Zhili clique Expulsion of Puyi and the Qing royal family from the Forbidden City

Parties
Guominjun; Anhui clique Supported by: Empire of Japan	Zhili clique

Lead figures
Feng Yuxiang; Duan Qirui; Matsumuro Takayoshi	Cao Kun

The Beijing Coup (Chinese: 北京政變; pinyin: Běijīng Zhèngbiàn) was the October 1924 coup d'état by Feng Yuxiang against Chinese President Cao Kun, leader of the Zhili warlord faction. Feng called it the Capital Revolution (Chinese: 首都革命; pinyin: Shǒudū Gémìng). The coup occurred at a crucial moment in the Second Zhili–Fengtian War and allowed the pro-Japanese Fengtian clique to defeat the previously dominant Zhili clique. Followed by a brief period of liberalization under Huang Fu, this government was replaced on 23 November 1924, by a conservative, pro-Japanese government led by Duan Qirui. The coup alienated many liberal Chinese from the Beijing government.

== Events ==
In 1923 Cao Kun became president by bribing the National Assembly. His Zhili clique, whose military was commanded by Wu Peifu, had already established itself as the dominant military force in China through a succession of resounding military victories. However, Cao was not satisfied with being just a strongman and wished the prestige of being officially titled head of state. After ousting President Li Yuanhong from office, Cao openly offered $5,000 to any member of parliament who would elect him president. There was massive public outrage against Cao's plan, but he succeeded despite a counter-bribe to not elect him, offered by Zhang Zuolin, Duan Qirui and Sun Yat-sen. Inaugurated on Double Ten Day that year (i.e., 10 October 1923) with a newly minted constitution, President Cao subsequently neglected his duties as president to concentrate on defeating the rival warlord factions.

One of Cao's subordinates, the semi-Zhili-affiliated Feng Yuxiang, became increasingly dissatisfied with Cao and Wu Peifu. Feng's sympathies lay with Sun Yat-sen's Kuomintang government in Guangzhou, and Japan had also supplied Feng with 1.5 million yen (via warlord Zhang Zuolin) in hopes that he would agree to topple the Cao government. The Japanese wanted to remove the Zhili government due to its strong anti-Japanese policy. In the autumn of 1924 the Zhili clique went to war with Zhang Zuolin's Fengtian clique in the Second Zhili–Fengtian War. With Wu at the helm of Zhili's armies, it was expected to be victorious. If the Fengtian clique was destroyed, the Zhili clique could finish off its few remaining rivals in the south with ease.

Early on 23 October 1924, however, Feng Yuxiang's Beijing defense troops seized control of key government buildings, public utilities and the roads leading into and out of Beijing. Cao Kun was placed under house arrest and stripped of his presidency. Upon receiving news of the coup, the Fengtian commanders Zhang Zongchang and Li Jinglin used this opportunity to launch a major offensive and broke the Zhili clique's frontline, putting them in a favorable military position. Zhang Zuolin took full advantage of the coup, pursued the Zhili army and won a major victory outside Tianjin.

Wu and his remaining forces fled to central China where they met up with his ally Sun Chuanfang. All of north China was divided between the Fengtian clique and Feng Yuxiang, whose forces were renamed the Guominjun (Nationalist Army or Citizens' Army). Zhang Zuolin took the prosperous northeast while Feng was left with the poor northwest.

After the coup, Feng placed Huang Fu as acting president of the Beijing government. Huang initiated several reforms on Feng's behalf, including the expulsion of Titular Emperor Puyi from the Forbidden City and abolishing the role of the old bell and drum towers as the official timepiece. However, Huang refused to guarantee foreign privileges and Zhang Zuolin became despondent at his one-time ally. The only major agreement Feng and Zhang made was to dissolve the discredited National Assembly and create a provisional government with the pro-Japanese but relatively competent Duan Qirui as its head.

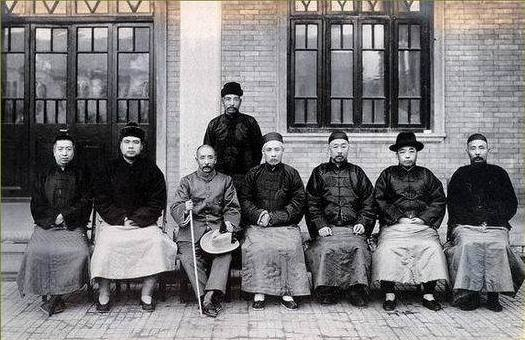
On 17 November 1924, Zhang Zuolin invited Feng Yuxiang to talk at the home of Tianjin Ruili. Feng decided to hold the section as "temporary ruling" and went to Beijing to preside over government affairs.

== Significance ==
Plans were made to hold negotiations for national reunification among Feng, Zhang, Duan and Sun Yat-sen. These were fruitless and Sun died in Beijing in March 1925.

Feng and Zhang came to blows when Fengtian General Guo Songling defected to the Guominjun on November 22 and started the Anti-Fengtian War. Six days after this Li Dazhao led a so-called First United Front movement to topple Duan's provisional government, calling it the Capital Revolution. Feng wanted to support this but changed his mind, preferring to concentrate his forces on Zhang's army. As a result, the Capital Revolution movement collapsed.

While the defeat of the powerful Zhili clique paved the way for the long-term success of the Northern Expedition by the Nationalist Party, its greatest impact was to buy time for the Kuomintang to build up its National Revolutionary Army. Had the coup not happened, the Zhili clique would surely have finished off the Kuomintang after defeating the Fengtian clique. Feng was saved from losing all his power by allying with Chiang Kai-shek during the Northern Expedition, but later became disillusioned with the Generalissimo's leadership. Feng rebelled against Chiang and was defeated during the Central Plains War of 1930.

== In popular culture ==
The coup was mentioned in Bernardo Bertolucci's film The Last Emperor, though it erroneously claims the president fled the capital instead of being put under house arrest.

== Bibliography ==
- Sheridan, James E. (1966). Chinese Warlord. The Career of Feng Yü-hsiang. Stanford, California: Stanford University Press. LCCN 65018978.
