= Cao Kun =

Chinese general and warlord (1862–1938)

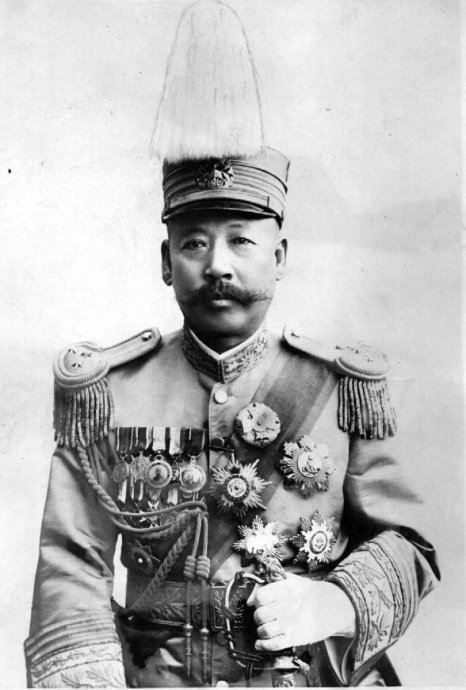

President of China
- In office 10 October 1923 – 2 November 1924
- Premier: Gao Lingwei (acting); Sun Baoqi; Wellington Koo; Huang Fu (acting)
- Preceded by: Gao Lingwei (acting)
- Succeeded by: Huang Fu (acting)

Personal details
- Born: 12 December 1862 Tianjin, Zhili, Qing China
- Died: 15 May 1938 (aged 75) Tianjin, Provisional Government of the Republic of China
- Party: Zhili clique
- Education: Tientsin Military Academy
- Awards: Order of Rank and Merit; Order of the Precious Brilliant Golden Grain; Order of Wen-Hu

Military service
- Allegiance: Qing dynasty Republic of China; Empire of China
- Rank: General
- Battles/wars: First Sino-Japanese War; National Protection War; Zhili–Anhui War; First Zhili–Fengtian War; Beijing Coup

General Cao Kun (simplified Chinese: 曹锟; traditional Chinese: 曹錕; pinyin: Cáo Kūn; Wade–Giles: Ts'ao K'un; courtesy name: Zhongshan (仲珊); December 12, 1862 – May 15, 1938) was a Chinese warlord and politician, who served as the President of China from 1923 to 1924, as well as the military leader of the Zhili clique in the Beiyang Army.

== Early life and rise to leadership ==
Cao was born to a poor family in Tianjin. During the First Sino-Japanese War in 1894, he went with the army to fight in Joseon. After the war was over he joined Yuan Shikai to participate in the training of the New Army (known as the Beiyang Army). Admired by Yuan, Cao managed to rise very quickly. By the time of the 1911 Xinhai Revolution he commanded the Beiyang 3rd Division. He was a staunch supporter of Confucianism, an opponent of liberalism and communism.

He was made a general in the Beiyang Army and led the Zhili clique after the death of Feng Guozhang. During the 1918 election he was promised the vice-presidency by Duan Qirui but the office remained vacant after most of the National Assembly left, depriving it of a quorum. He felt betrayed by Duan and defeated him in battle in 1920. After forcing the resignations of both Xu Shichang and Li Yuanhong, and engaging in bribery, he became president of China (in Beijing) on 10 October 1923, serving to 2 November 1924.

In March 1922, Cao attempted to launch an airline, "Beijing-Han Airlines", with a Handley Page aircraft (likely a modified HP O/400). Unfortunately, the airline's 3-day trial tour ended in disaster: the plane crashed on approach to Beijing, killing all 14 onboard.

Cao had a family connection to the Chinese Muslim military commander Ma Fuxing, who resided in Xinjiang.

== "Bribing president" ==
Cao Kun acquired the presidential office by threats, extortion, and bribing assembly members with 5,000 silver dollars each. That episode brought disrepute to the Beiyang government and the National Assembly, which lacked a quorum even to hold elections. It also turned all the rival factions against him, and his own clique began suffering from dissension. Relations with his chief protégé, Wu Peifu, soured and there were rumors of an impending split within the Zhili clique, but they stayed together to fight against the Fengtian clique. He promulgated the draft 1923 Constitution of China in an effort to legitimize his presidential claim. The constitution contradicted his rhetoric against foreign influence and democracy. Hastily drafted by the guilt-ridden assembly, it was deemed the most democratic and progressive charter yet, but like previous charters, it was ignored completely.

During the Second Zhili-Fengtian War against Zhang Zuolin in October 1924, Cao was betrayed and imprisoned by one of his own officers, General Feng Yuxiang, in the Beijing coup. Feng occupied Beijing and forced Cao to resign. His brother, Cao Rui, committed suicide while he was under house arrest. In 1926, Cao Kun was released from captivity as a goodwill gesture by Feng to Wu Peifu.

Cao died in his home at Tianjin in May 1938.

Political offices
Preceded by Gao Lingwei	President of China; 1923–1924	Succeeded by Huang Fu
