= Gate of Supreme Harmony =

- 太和门 太和門
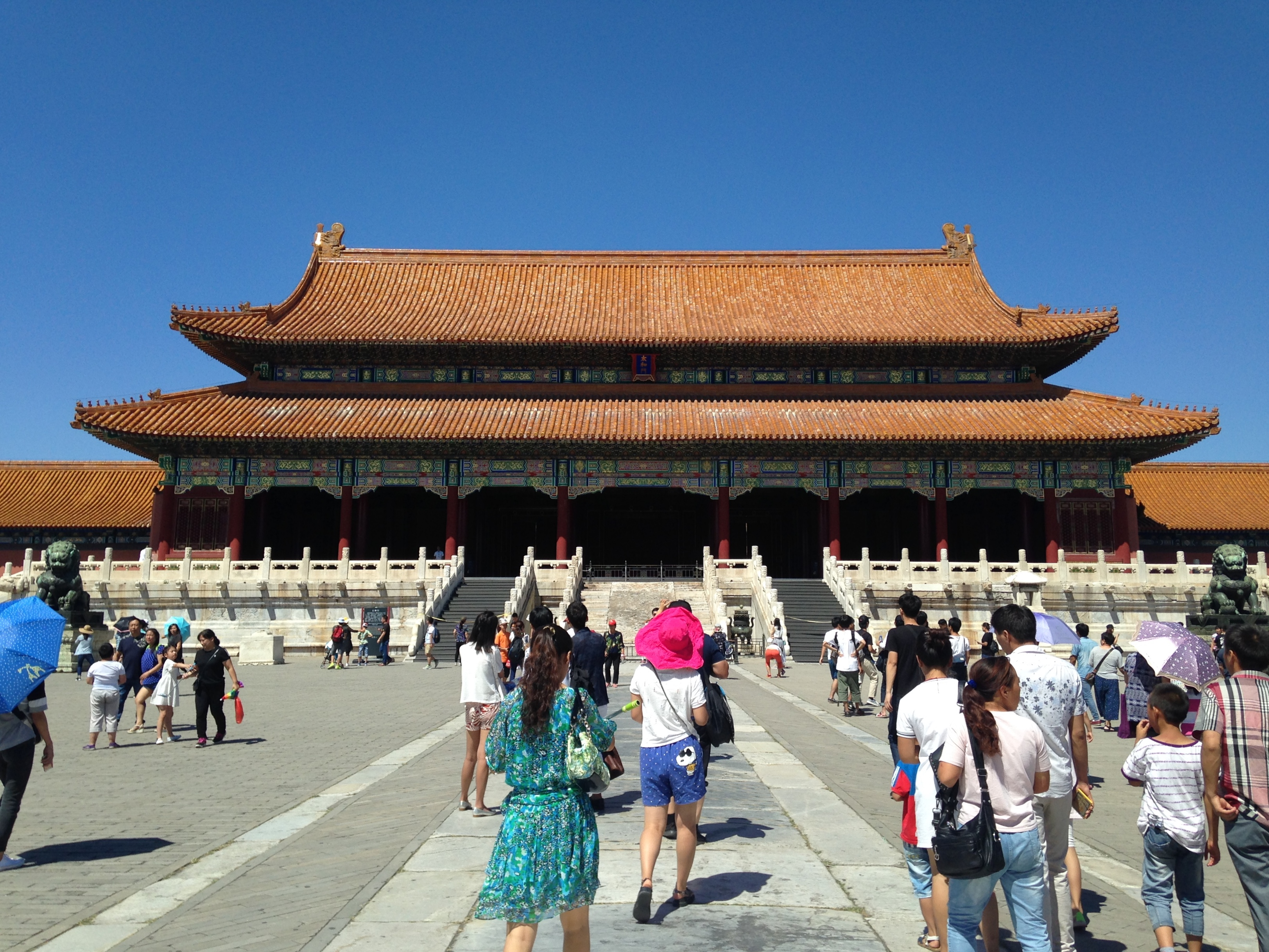
- Interactive map of the Gate of Supreme Harmony area
- Former names: Fengtianmen

General information
- Type: Gate
- Location: Forbidden City, Beijing, China
- Coordinates: 39°54′50.3″N 116°23′26.7″E
- Renovated: 1894

Technical details
- Floor area: 1,371.4 square metres (14,762 sq ft)

The Gate of Supreme Harmony (simplified Chinese: 太和门; traditional Chinese: 太和門; pinyin: Tàihémén; Manchu: ᠠᠮᠪᠠ
ᡥᡡᠸᠠᠯᡳᠶᠠᠮᠪᡠᡵᡝ
ᡩᡠᡴᠠ; Möllendorff: amba hūwaliyambure duka) is the second major gate in the south of the Forbidden City in Beijing, China.

The gate was originally built during the Ming dynasty, when it was called Fengtianmen (奉天門). Following the Manchu conquest of China, the gate was given its present Chinese and Manchu names. The gate burned down in 1886 due to a fire started by a tipped lamp in the guard room. The present gate dates from the rebuilding after this fire, which was completed in 1894.

In the Ming dynasty, the Emperor held morning court sessions at the Gate of Supreme Harmony to discuss state affairs with his ministers, although throughout most of the Ming dynasty the court sessions were purely ceremonial, a demonstration of the Emperor's diligence and the status of the titular first minister. In the Qing dynasty, when the Emperor attended court far more frequently, morning court sessions were held at the Gate of Heavenly Purity, which is much closer to the Emperor's living quarters. The Gate of Supreme Harmony was used occasionally for banquets and other ceremonies.

The gate is three bays deep and seven bays wide, covering a total area of 1,371.4 square metres (14,762 sq ft). It is flanked by two minor gates, Zhendu Gate to the west and Zhaode Gate to the east. The gate and the Meridian Gate form the north and south boundaries of a great plaza that is divided by a serpentine waterway, the Inner River of the Golden Water, which is spanned by a set of five bridges. On the north (inner) side of the gate is Harmony Square, leading to the grand Hall of Supreme Harmony, the ceremonial centre of the Forbidden City.

Many incense burners are arrayed around the stairs. The central stairway was reserved exclusively for the Emperor and his immediate attendants, as was the central entrance of Meridian Gate.

== Gallery ==
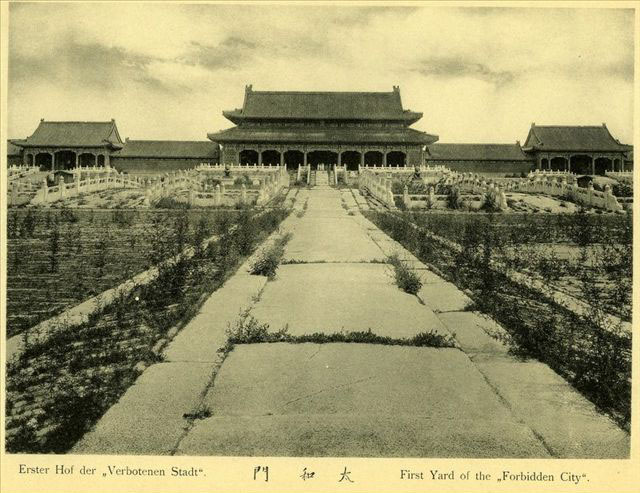
Gate of Supreme Harmony, 1900.

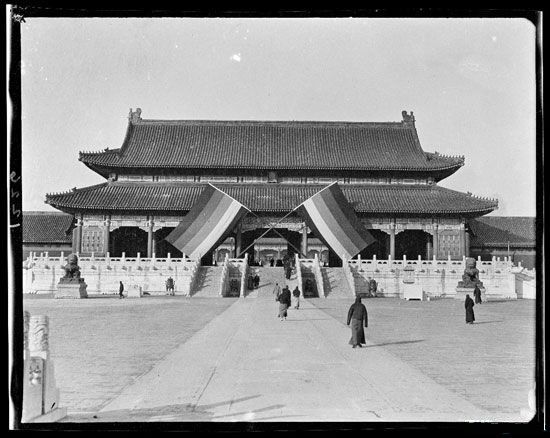
Celebration of the end of the First World War.

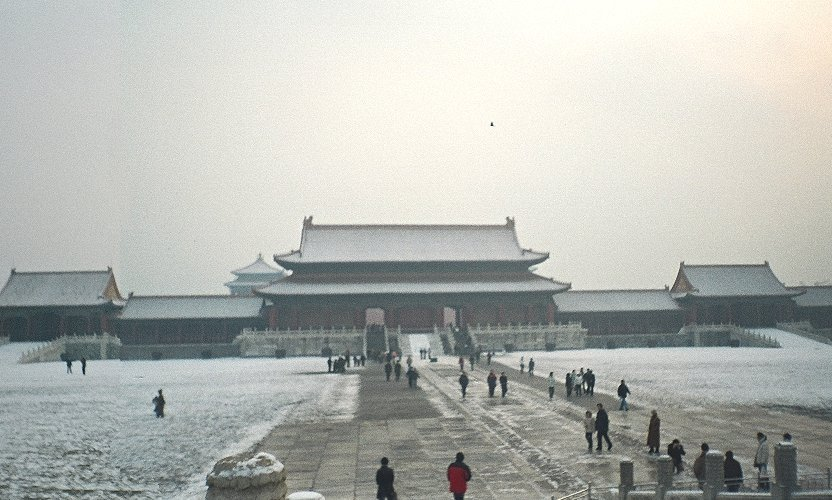
Northern-view, winter.

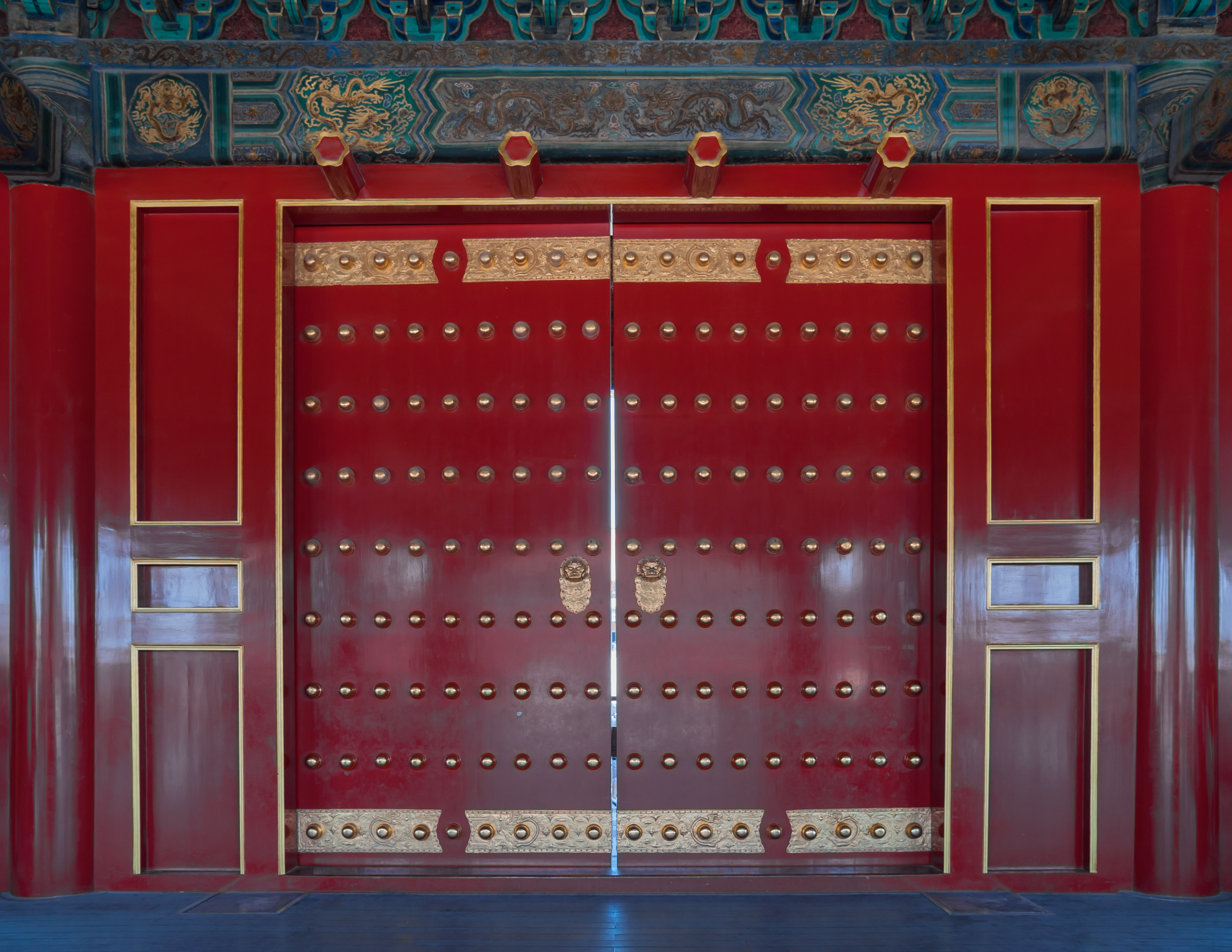
Gate detail.

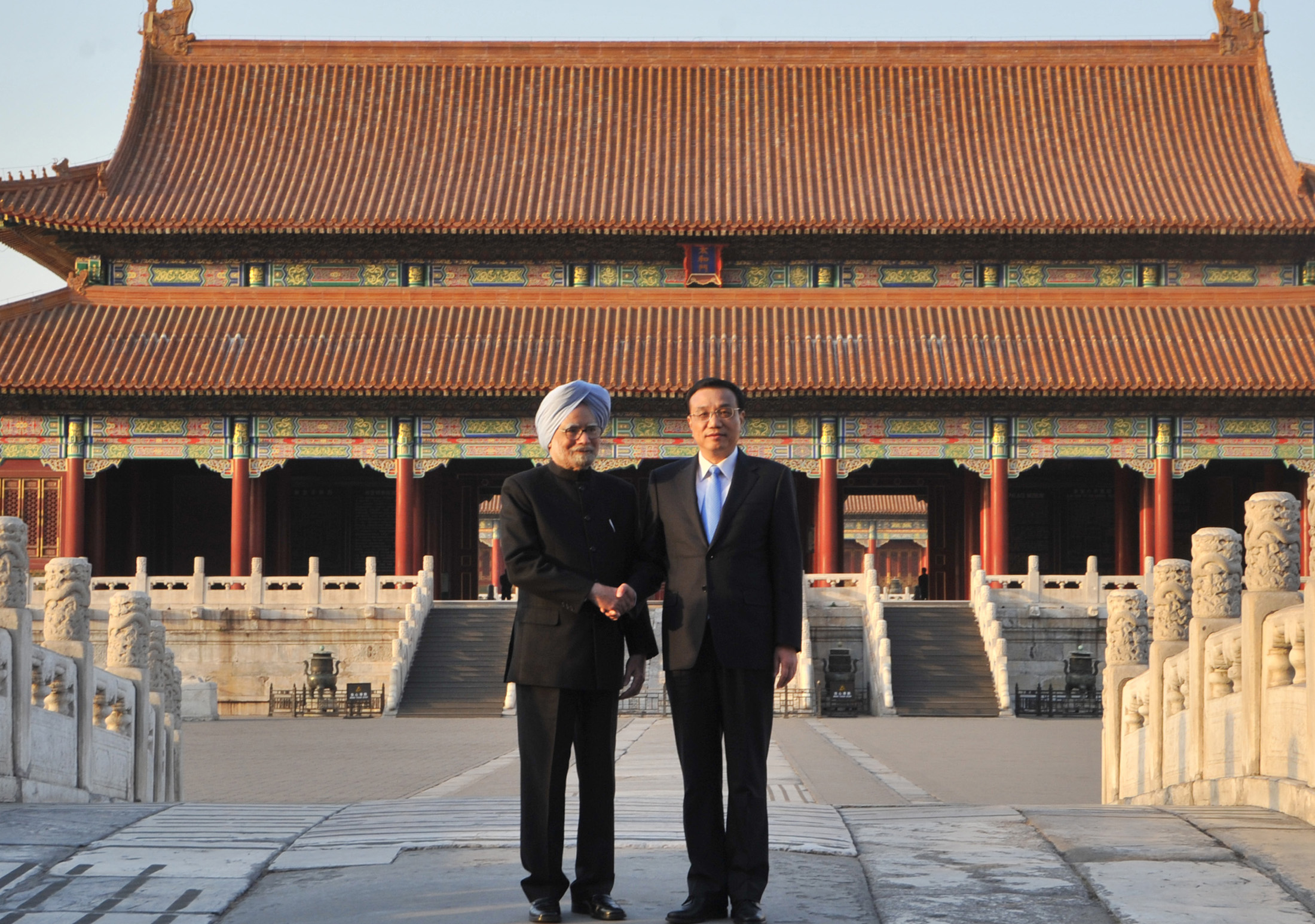
Visiting Indian Prime-Minister Dr. Manmohan Singh, with PRC Premiere Li Keqiang, 23rd October, 2013.

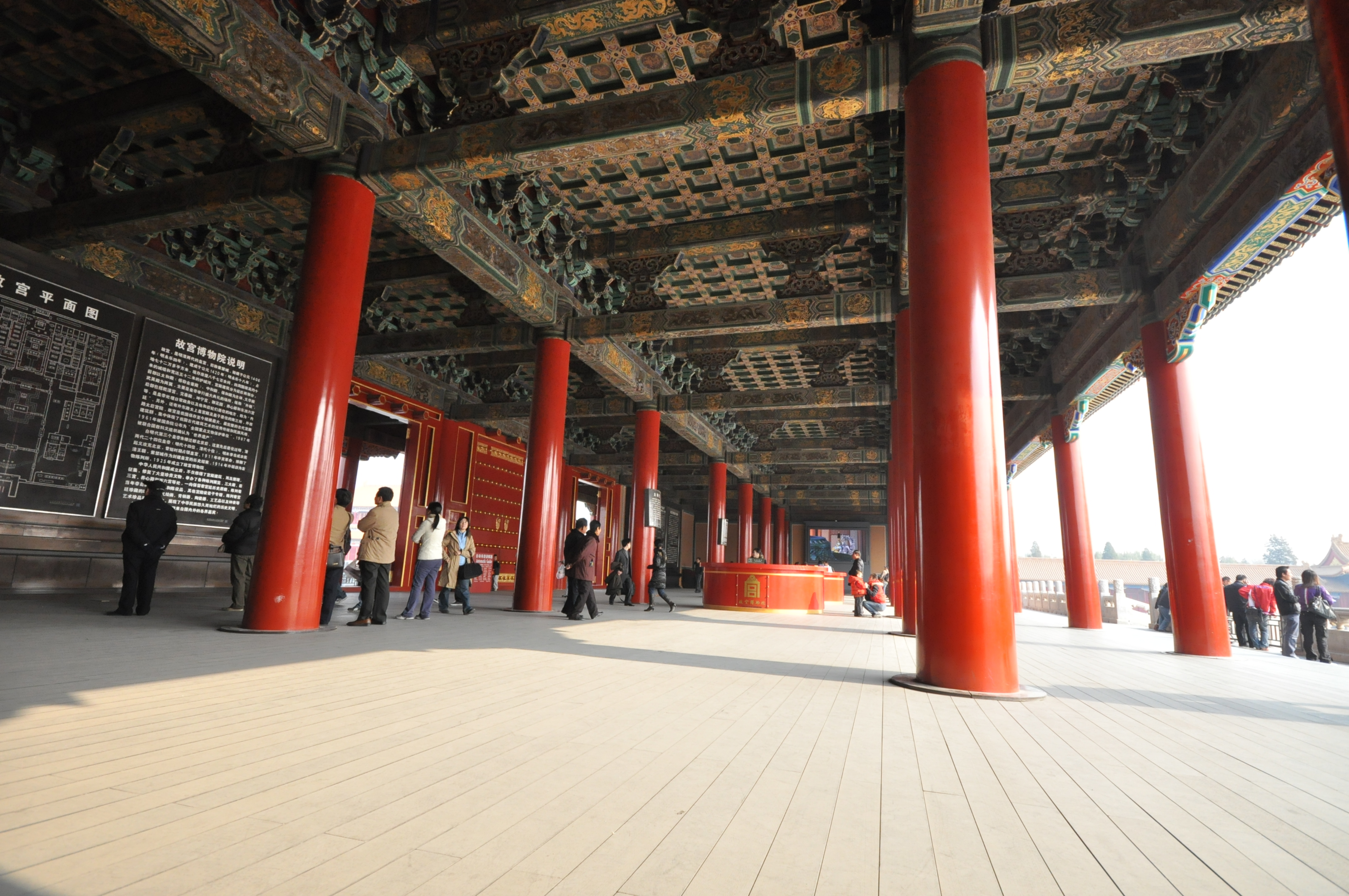
Interior detail.
