= List of warlords and military cliques in the Warlord Era =

List of indexes to lists on a topic

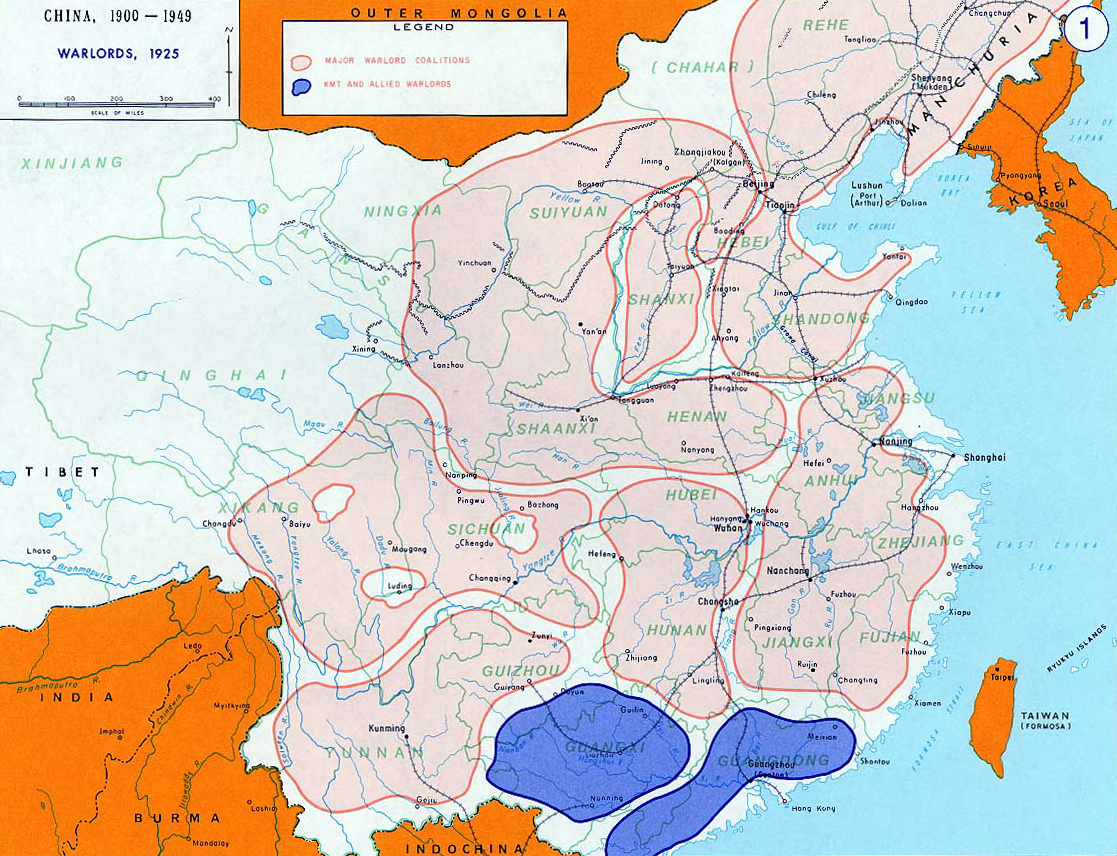
Major Chinese warlord coalitions as of 1925

The Warlord Era was a historical period of the Republic of China that began from 1916 and lasted until the mid-1930s, during which the country was divided and ruled by various military cliques following the death of Yuan Shikai in 1916. Communist revolution broke out in the later part of the warlord period, beginning the Chinese Civil War. The era nominally ended in 1928 at the conclusion of the Northern Expedition with the Northeast Flag Replacement, beginning the "Nanjing decade". However, "residual warlords" continued to exist into the 1930s under de jure Kuomintang rule, and remained until the Communist victory in the Chinese Civil War in 1949.

The warlords and military cliques of the Warlord Era are generally divided into the Northern factions and the Southern factions. The following is a list of cliques within each faction, and the dominant warlords within that clique.

== Northern factions ==
The cliques in the North emerged from the fragmentation of the Beiyang Government/Army. Most of them were generals under Yuan Shikai. After the death of Yuan, they separated and formed cliques in their own sphere of influence.

=== Anhui Clique ===
The Anhui clique was named so because many of its most influential members were from Anhui, including founder Duan Qirui. It had an affiliated political party, the Anfu club, and a financial wing, the New Communications clique, under Deputy Foreign Minister Cao Rulin.

The clique had close ties to Japan, granting concessions in exchange for funding and military training, and advocated war against the German Empire as part of the First World War, as well as military suppression of the Kuomintang.

The clique was removed from power after the Zhili–Anhui War and slowly faded from prominence.

Name	Years of dominance	Notes
Duan Qirui 段祺瑞	1916–1926	Premier: 1913, 1916–18; President: 1924–26: Negotiated the Nishihara Loans with Japan in exchange for Shandong Concession, triggering the May Fourth Movement
Xu Shuzheng 徐樹錚	1916–1920	Duan Qirui's right-hand man; led expedition that reincorporated Outer Mongolia and temporarily brought it back under Chinese control
Duan Zhigui 段芝貴		Minister of War: 1917–1919; known as the "Adopted Prince"
Jin Yunpeng 靳雲鵬		Premier: 1919–1921
Wang Yitang 王揖唐		Chairman of the House of Representatives 1918–1920
Lu Yongxiang 盧永祥		Ruler of Zhejiang and Shanghai, his refusal to hand over Shanghai caused the Second Zhili–Fengtian War
Zhang Jingyao 張敬堯	1917–1920	Governor of Hunan noted for his exceptional brutality; assassinated in 1933 after he became involved with the Japanese plot to enthrone Puyi as emperor of Manchukuo
Wu Guangxin 吳光新	1917–1920	Governor of Hunan
Ni Sichong 倪嗣衝		former supporter of Yuan Shikai's Empire; eliminated in the Zhili–Anhui War
Qu Tongfeng 曲同豊		
Chen Shufan 陳樹藩	1916–1921	
Zheng Shiqi 鄭士琦	1923–1925	Military governor of Shandong (1923–25) and Anhui (1925).
Zhang Huaizhi 張懷芝	1912–1924	Viceroy of Shandong. Former supporter of Yuan Shikai's Empire; eliminated in the Second Zhili–Fengtian War
Wang Yongquan 王永泉	1918–1924	Military Governor of Fujian Province.

=== Zhili Clique ===
Zhili was the name for the area of what is now Beijing, Tianjin and Hebei.

The Zhili clique was formed by officers disgruntled with the Anhui clique and rallied around Feng Guozhang. It was aligned to Western powers.

The clique took power after the Zhili–Anhui War but lost after the Second Zhili–Fengtian War. It was largely wiped out during the Northern Expedition.

Name	Years of dominance	Notes
Feng Guozhang 馮國璋	1916–1919	Served as President 1917–1918. Died in 1919 and was succeeded by Cao Kun
Cao Kun 曹錕	1919–1924	Bribed his way to the presidency and served from 1923 to 1924; arrested and imprisoned during the Beijing Coup by Feng Yuxiang
Wu Peifu 吳佩孚	1919–1927	Military commander and strategist of the Zhili clique credited with the victories that pushed Zhili to power but ultimately failed hold onto power in the Second Zhili–Fengtian War. Known as the "Jade Marshal".
Sun Chuanfang 孫傳芳	1919–1927	Controlled most of the Lower Yangtze but defeated in the Northern Expedition
Lu Jianzhang 陸建章		supporter of Yuan Shikai's Empire, killed by Fengtian clique in 1918
Li Chun 李純		
Wang Zhanyuan 王占元		Hubei warlord
Chen Guangyuan 陳光遠		
Wang Chengbin 王承斌		Ethnic Manchu
Peng Shoushen 彭壽莘	–1924	
Kou Yingjie 寇英傑	–1927	
Qi Xieyuan 齊燮元	1920–1924	Inspector-general of Jiangsu, Jiangxi and Anhui Provinces. Later Japanese puppet, executed after the war.

=== Fengtian clique ===
Fengtian is the former name of Liaoning province, and was the political center of Manchuria.

The Fengtian clique controlled most of Manchuria up to the Shanhai Pass and had a close relationship with Japan. Its civilian branch was the Communications Clique, under Premier Liang Shiyi.

It took power in Beijing after the Second Zhili–Fengtian War but could not stop the Kuomintang during the Northern Expedition, and was driven from Manchuria after the Mukden Incident and merged with the Kuomintang.

Name	Years of dominance	Notes
Zhang Zuolin 張作霖	1916–1928	Leader of the Fengtian Army, ruler of Northeast China; Assassinated by a Japanese military officer for his failure to halt the expansion of the Kuomintang. Known as the "Old Marshal", father of Zhang Xueliang.
Zhang Xueliang 張學良	1928–1937	Son and successor to Zhang Zuolin, he eventually reconciled the Fengtian clique with the Kuomintang. Known as the "Young Marshal".
Guo Songling 郭松齡	1920–1925	General in the Fengtian Army. Rebelled during the Anti-Fengtian War but was defeated and killed in action
Zhang Zongchang 張宗昌	1925–1928	Ruler of the Shandong province. Known for a colorful personality, called the "Dogmeat General".
Zhang Haipeng 張海鵬		
Zhang Jinghui 張景惠		Afterwards Prime Minister of Manchukuo. Called the "Tofu Prime Minister" due to his pro-Japanese views.
Li Jinglin 李景林		Known as Li Fangchen and "China's First Sword"
Tang Yulin 湯玉麟		
Wan Fulin 萬福麟		
Wu Junsheng 吳俊陞		Commander of Fengtian Cavalry
Yang Yuting 楊宇霆		Executed by Zhang Xueliang for his part in the assassination of Zhang Zuolin
Liu Zhennian 劉珍年		"King of East Shandong"; defected to KMT during the Northern Expedition, defeated by Han Fuju
Xu Lanzhou 許蘭洲	1895–1928	originally a Qing general, later served under Zhang Zuolin

=== Shanxi/Jin Clique ===
Formed in the Xinhai Revolution, the Shanxi clique was limited to Shanxi province only.

Jin was the traditional name of Shanxi province. Therefore, the clique is often called the Jin clique as well.

Although affiliated with the Anhui clique, Yan Xishan, leader of the Shanxi Clique, remained neutral until the Northern Expedition, during which he sided with the Kuomintang.

Name	Years of dominance	Notes
Yan Xishan 閻錫山	1911–1949	Military ruler of Shanxi; Joined the Kuomintang but later rebelled against Chiang Kai-shek in the Central Plains War. Defeated by the Communists in 1949, withdrew to Taiwan. Known as the "Model Governor".
Fu Zuoyi 傅作義	1927–1949	Ruler of Suiyuan; defected to the Communists in 1949
Shang Zhen 商震		

=== Guominjun ===
Also known as the Northwestern Army, it was formed from disgruntled Zhili clique officers during the Second Zhili–Fengtian War, through the Beijing Coup.

Although originally sympathetic to the Kuomintang, it rebelled in the 1930 Central Plains War and was defeated. It was aligned to the Soviet Union.

Name	Years of dominance	Notes
Feng Yuxiang 馮玉祥	1924–1934	Leader of the Northwest, initially Zhili warlord
Yang Hucheng 楊虎城	1918–1936	Shaanxi ruler from 1926, helped kidnap Chiang Kai-shek in the Xi'an Incident.
Sun Yue 孫岳	1924–1928	
Liu Zhenhua 劉鎮華		Originally Anhui clique, then defected to the Zhili clique, then Guominjun and finally to the KMT.
Hu Jingyi 胡景翼	1924–1925	Military governor of Henan
Deng Baoshan 鄧寶珊		Subordinate of Hu Jingyi, later Communist governor of Gansu, killed in the Cultural Revolution.
Yue Weijun 岳維峻		
Bie Tingfang 別廷芳		Henan warlord; switched to KMT
Sun Dianying 孫殿英		Henan bandit; allied with Feng Yuxiang, Zhang Zongchang
Song Zheyuan 宋哲元	1927–1930	Defected to KMT in 1930, warlord of Chahar Province and Rehe Province
Jing Yuexiu 井岳秀	1913–1936	Northern Shaanxi warlord, cooperated with various other cliques.
Han Fuju 韓復榘	1930–1938	Chairman of the Shandong Province; Defected to KMT in 1930. arrested and shot after abandoning his province when the Second Sino-Japanese War started.
Shi Yousan 石友三	1912–1940	Chairman of Anhui province, 1929. Known as the "Defector General" for his repeated defections between various warlords, KMT factions, communists and Japan.
Fan Zhongxiu 樊鍾秀	1911–1931	served many different factions successively, killed in the Central Plains War
Ji Hongchang 吉鴻昌		Later joined the Communist Party, executed by the KMT.
Zhang Zhijiang 張之江		

=== Ma clique ===
The "Three Mas of the Northwest" or "Xibei San Ma" originated in the Kansu Braves militia formed during the Dungan revolt. All Ma Clique Generals were Hui people Muslim Kuomintang members. The Ma Cliques Fought against the Guominjun during the Central Plains War and attempted to destroy the Xinjiang clique during the Kumul Rebellion but were defeated by Soviet Red Army intervention.

Name	Years of dominance	Notes
Ma Anliang 馬安良	1912–1918	Ruler of the Gansu province, Outranked all the other Ma Clique generals.
Ma Fuxiang 馬福祥	1912–1928	De facto leader after Ma Anliang; Ruler of Ningxia and Suiyuan
Ma Hongbin 馬鴻賓	1921–1928	brief acting Chairman of Gansu Province and Ningxia Province
Ma Hongkui 馬鴻逵	1923–1949	Army commander then ruler of Ningxia Province from 1932
Ma Zhongying 馬仲英	1929–1934	Chief of the 36th Division and ruler of Gansu and Southern Xinjiang (Tunganistan)
Ma Hushan 馬虎山	1934–1950	Chief of the 36th Division and ruler of Southern Xinjiang (Tunganistan)
Ma Zhancang 馬占倉		served under Ma Zhongying
Zhang Peiyuan 張培元	1929–1934	Han Chinese Commander of Ili, allied with the Ma Clique against the Xinjiang Clique
Ma Qi 馬麒	1915–1931	Ninghai Army ruler of Qinghai province, influential in Gansu province
Ma Lin 馬麟	1931–1938	Ninghai Army ruler of Qinghai province
Ma Bufang 馬步芳	1938–1945	Ninghai Army ruler of Qinghai province
Ma Buqing 馬步青		Ninghai Army

=== Xinjiang clique ===
Under Yang Zengxin, the clique organized the defence against the Soviet encroachment, but later closely affiliated with the Soviet Union.

Name	Years of dominance	Notes
Yang Zengxin 楊增新	1912–1928	Ruler of the Xinjiang province from the Qing era. Always recognized whichever government was dominant.
Ma Fuxing 馬福興	1912–1924	Titai of Kashgar, Military Commander of Southern Xinjiang
Ma Shaowu 馬紹武	1924–1937	Executed Ma Fuxing on Yang Zengxin's orders, then replaced him as Tao-yin of Kashgar, Military Commander of Southern Xinjiang
Jin Shuren 金樹仁	1928–1934	Ruler of the Xinjiang province.
Sheng Shicai 盛世才	1933–1944	Ruler of the Xinjiang province and Soviet puppet

=== Manchu Restorationists ===
In July 1917 a clique of generals and officials were able to conquer and occupy Beijing, temporarily restoring the deposed child emperor Puyi for 12 days.

Name	Years of dominance	Notes
Zhang Xun 張勳	July 1–12, 1917	Leader of the Manchu restoration, installed himself as Prime Minister of the Imperial Cabinet. Known as the "Queue General".
Kang Youwei 康有為	July 1–12, 1917	Helped Zhang Xun in the restoration
Jiang Chaozong 江朝宗	July 1–12, 1917	

== Southern factions ==
The military cliques in the South are generally regional revolutionary leaders that took over after the fall of Qing dynasty in Xinhai Revolution.

=== Kuomintang ===
The Nationalist Party of China, derived from the Tongmenghui revolutionary organization, established a rival government of the Beiyang Government in Guangzhou, Guangdong Province in the 1913 Second Revolution and in the 1917 Constitutional Protection War. Its military was called the National Revolutionary Army.

The party nominally reunified China in 1928 after defeating most Northern factions during the KMT's Northern Expedition, governing the country from Nanjing.

Name	Years of dominance	Notes
Sun Yat-sen 孫中山	1912–1925	Founder of the Republic of China and leader of the Kuomintang
Chiang Kai-shek 蔣介石	1926–1975	Military leader of the Kuomintang and later President of the ROC until his death
He Yingqin 何應欽	1926–1950	Senior General in the Kuomintang. Known as the "Lucky General".
Hu Hanmin 胡漢民	1925–1936	Leader of the right wing faction of the Kuomintang
Liao Zhongkai 廖仲愷	1923–1925	Architect of the First United Front with the Chinese Communist Party
Wang Jingwei 汪精衛	1925–1944	Leader of the left wing faction of the Kuomintang, later Japanese collaborator during World War II
Yu Youren 于右任	1918–1922	Shaanxi revolutionary commander, later headed the Control Yuan.

=== Chinese Communist Party ===
The Chinese Communist Party formed in 1921 in the aftermath of the May Fourth Movement. Its military arm eventually became the People's Liberation Army.

The party was allied with the Kuomintang during the first phase of the Northern Expedition, but the two sides split following the Shanghai massacre in 1927. The two parties would then fight a decades long civil war, which ended with the Kuomintang retreat to Taiwan and the founding of the People's Republic of China on the mainland.

Name	Years of dominance	Notes
Chen Duxiu 陳獨秀	1921–1927	Party co-founder and first General Secretary, ousted after the Shanghai Massacre
Li Dazhao 李大釗	1921–1927	Party co-founder, captured and executed by Zhang Zuolin during the Northern Expedition
Zhou Enlai 周恩来	1924–1976	Senior party leader, later Premier of the People's Republic of China
Mao Zedong 毛澤東	1935–1976	Party activist, later party chairman and Chairman of the People's Republic of China

=== Yunnan clique ===
The Yunnan Military Government was established on October 30, 1911, with Cai E elected as the military governor. This marked the beginning of the "Yunnan clique".

Name	Years of dominance	Notes
Cai E 蔡鍔	1911–1916	Leader of the Yunnan Army
Zhu De 朱德	1911–1920	protege of Cai, later Commander-in-Chief of the Chinese Red Army
Tang Jiyao 唐繼堯	1913–1927	Military governor of Yunnan
Hu Ruoyu 胡若愚	1927	Governor of Yunnan
Long Yun 龍雲	1927–1945	Ethnic Yi, Governor of Yunnan
Lu Han 盧漢	1937–1949	Ethnic Yi and cousin of Long Yun, defected to communists in 1949.

=== Guizhou warlords ===
Guizhou Province was dominated by a series of successive autonomous warlords.

Name	Years of dominance	Notes
Liu Xianshi 劉顯世	–1920	Originally a Qing dynasty commander, neutral between the Beiyang and KMT, overthrown by his nephew Wang Wenhua.
Wang Wenhua 王文華	1920–1921	KMT-supporting warlord, assassinated by Yuan Zuming.
Yuan Zuming 袁祖銘	1921–1927	Initial aligned to the Beiyang government, nominally acknowledged the KMT government in 1926, but assassinated a year later.
Wang Jialie 王家烈	1929–1935	Nominally acknowledged KMT rule, deposed by KMT during the pursuit of the Long March.

=== Old Guangxi clique ===
Guangxi province announced its independence on November 6, 1911. Originally, the revolutionaries supported the Qing Governor to remain in position. However, he later left the province, and Lu Rongting succeeded his position.

Name	Years of dominance	Notes
Cen Chunxuan 岑春煊	1916–1920	Qing dynasty Governor and Military Governor of Guangdong
Lu Rongting 陸榮廷	1912–1922	
Chen Bingkun 陳炳焜	1916–1921	
Shen Hongying 沈鴻英	1923–1925	Military governor of Guangdong (1923–1924)

=== New Guangxi clique ===
After the Guangdong–Guangxi War, the Old Guangxi clique was no longer effective, and was replaced by the New Guangxi clique. It supported the Kuomintang's Northern Expedition but rebelled during the Central Plains War.

Name	Years of dominance	Notes
Li Zongren 李宗仁	1923–1949	
Bai Chongxi 白崇禧	1923–1949	Muslim, Head of the Chinese Islamic National Salvation Federation, widely considered successor-designate of Chiang.
Huang Shaoxiong 黃紹竑	1923–1949	
Xia Wei 夏威		

=== Guangdong warlords ===
Guangdong was independent on November 8. The Guangdong Army was in the early 1920s mostly dominated by Chen Jiongming. In the 1930s, Chen Jitang was chairman of the government.

Name	Years of dominance	Notes
Long Jiguang 龍濟光	1911–1918	Qing commander, supporter of Yuan Shikai's Empire of China, later affiliated with the Anhui Clique. An ethnic Hani.
Chen Jiongming 陳炯明	1911–1924	Initially allied to KMT, defected to Zhili clique in 1922 but defeated by Chiang Kai-Shek
Ye Ju 叶擧	1929–1936	Initially Long Jiguang's deputy, then Chen Jiongming's deputy
Deng Benyin 鄧本殷		
Chen Jitang 陳濟棠	1929–1936	

=== Sichuan clique ===
During the period from 1927 to 1938, Sichuan was in the hands of multiple warlords. No warlord had enough power to take on all the others at once, so many small battles occurred, pitting one warlord against another.

Name	Years of dominance	Notes
Yin Changheng 尹昌衡	1912–1913	Tongmenghui revolutionary, founder of the clique
Liu Cunhou 劉存厚		Qing dynasty commander, joined the KMT in 1928.
Xiong Kewu 熊克武		Revolutionary, eliminated in 1925.
Li Jiayu 李家鈺		
Luo Zezhou 羅澤洲		
Liu Xiang 劉湘	1921–1938	
Yang Sen 楊森		
Liu Wenhui 劉文輝		later warlord of Xikang Province, defected to the Communist Party
Tian Songyao 田頌堯		
Deng Xihou 鄧錫侯		

=== Hunan warlords ===
Hunan Province was ruled by successive autonomous warlords.

Name	Years of dominance	Notes
Tan Yankai 譚延闓	1912–1920	Kuomintang politician
Zhao Hengti 趙恆惕	1920–1926	friendly to the Zhili Clique
Tang Shengzhi 唐生智	1926–1927	Defected to Chiang during the Northern Expedition, rebelled against Chiang during the Central Plains War
Peng Dehuai 彭德懷		subordinate of Tang; later Deputy Commander-in-Chief of the Chinese Red Army
He Long 賀龍		Began his military career under a Hunan warlord, later joined the Kuomintang and then the Chinese Red Army
He Jian 何鍵	1927-	
Cheng Qian 程潛		KMT commander for Hunan
