= Anhui clique =

Chinese faction during the Warlord Era

Anhui Clique
- 皖系
- Active: 1916–1920
- Disbanded: 1926
- Country: Republic of China
- Allegiance: Beiyang government
- Type: Warlord faction
- Size: 300,000–500,000 (Estimate at peak)
- Engagements: Zhili–Anhui War; Occupation of Mongolia; Constitutional Protection Movement; Second Zhili–Fengtian War; March 18 Massacre

Commanders
- Premier: Duan Qirui
- General: Xu Shuzheng

The Anhui clique (Chinese: 皖系; pinyin: Wǎn Xì) was a military and political organization, one of several mutually hostile cliques or factions that split from the Beiyang clique in the Republic of China's Warlord Era. It was named after Anhui province because several of its generals–including its founder, Duan Qirui–were born in Anhui.

The clique's main members were Duan Qirui, Duan Zhigui, Jin Yunpeng, Wang Yitang, Lu Yongxiang, Zhang Jingyao, Wu Guangxin, Chen Shufan, Zheng Shiqi, Xu Shuzheng, etc.

The Anhui Clique was largely a collection of military officers with connections to Duan Qirui, either due to family ties such as Wu Guangxin, being from the same locality such as Duan Zhigui, or having a teacher-student relationship such as Xu Shuzheng or Jin Yunpeng. The Anhui Clique would grow to be defined by a policy of national unification by military conquest over peaceful diplomacy, which contrasted with their rivals in the Zhili Clique.

Because the Anhui clique organized itself very early, it was more politically sophisticated than its warlord rivals, with an associated civilian wing being organised as the Anfu Club.

The Anhui clique had an uneasy co-existence with the Zhili clique and Fengtian clique in the politics of the Beiyang government, often finding itself at odds with the two cliques.

== History ==
During the National Protection War (1915–1916) Duan Qirui gave his support to the Kuomintang revolutionaries against Yuan Shikai. In 1916, after the death of Yuan Shikai and the end of the Constitutional Protection War, Premier Duan Qirui would become Premier of the Republic, with Li Yuanhong serving as the President of the Republic, Li Yuanhong acted as a puppet of Duan Qirui due to him being easily manipulated essentially giving the Anhui Clique almost complete control over the Beiyang Government.

With Japanese support and the suppression of the Manchu Restoration in 1917, the Anhui clique became the most powerful faction in China from 1916 to 1920.

The Anhui clique advocated for a hardline approach during the Constitutional Protection War, giving the revolutionaries his political support as Duan Qirui sought to become the President of the Republic.

After the death of Yuan Shikai and his abdication of the Hongxiang Emperor the Beiyang government was restored to which Duan Qirui served as premier under the presidency of Li Yuanhong; Effectively giving Duan Qirui the leadership of China by controlling the weak President, the Clique would only rise in terms of power until 1920.

In 1919 the May Fourth Movement weakened their influence and eventually led to the Zhili–Anhui War in 1920 which saw the surprise defeat of the Anhui clique.

In 1920 Duan Qirui resigned and the clique lacked national leadership for the next four years when all their provinces were eventually annexed by the Zhili clique by the summer of 1924. (Shandong was an anomaly, the Zhili clique appointed an Anhui general in 1923 there provided he remain neutral, see Shandong Problem. Zheng Shiqi ruled until 1925 when he transferred it to Fengtian's Zhang Zongchang per agreement with Duan.)

After the Beijing Coup, Feng Yuxiang and Zhang Zuolin picked Duan to lead a provisional government. Lacking any significant military power, he and his few remaining supporters played Feng and Zhang against each other. They eventually removed him from power and his last followers joined the Fengtian clique.

== Political wing ==
The Anhui clique also had a political wing known as the Anfu Club (literally, Peace and Happiness Club, after a Beijing lane where they met; folk etymology claims it was a pun on Anhui and Fujian) which consisted of politicians that threw their fortune in with Duan.

Formed on 7 March 1918 by Xu Shuzheng and Wang Yitang, it ran for elections for the northern National Assembly and won three-fourths of the seats primarily because Anhui warlords bought the votes.

The Anfu Club was a highly disciplined party created to push Duan Qirui's agenda through legal means such as electing fellow party member Xu Shichang as President of the ROC.

Before the Zhili–Anhui War, it was also supported by the Fengtian clique, Xinjiang clique, and Shanxi clique.

The Anfu Club was later destroyed after the Zhili-Anhui War when the Assembly was disbanded.

== Financial wing ==
Their financial wing was the New Communications Clique (1916–1919) led by Cao Rulin, it was the rival to Liang Shiyi's Old Communications Clique.

Cao's conduct during the Paris Peace Conference led to the May Fourth Movement and his dismissal.

== Military ==
The Anhui Clique, as opposed to their civilian partners in the Anfu Club, was primarily an association of generals and military governors.

Duan Qirui commanded an army independent from the Ministry of War, originally named the War Participation Army, which was funded and trained by the Japanese and consisted of around 50,000 troops. Qu Tongfeng commanded the 1st Division, Ma Liang commanded the 2nd Division, and Chen Wenyuan commanded the 3rd Division. There were also five additional mixed brigades, stationed in Luoyang, Zhangjiakou and the suburbs of Beijing.

Within the Central Army, the official national army of the Beijing Government, several generals and their divisions were loyal to the Anhui Clique. The 9th and 13th Division stationed near Beijing were led by Anhui Clique generals, Wei Zonghan and Li Jincai respectively, and the 15th Division led by Liu Xun would defect to the Anhui Clique following the death of Zhili Clique leader Feng Guozhang. Additionally, in 1919, the 4th, 5th, 8th and 10th Divisions were led by Anhui Clique officers and were stationed in provinces loyal to the Anhui Clique along with several other mixed brigades.

The last significant component of the Anhui Clique was the provincial military governors and local armies. Wu Guangxin commanded the Upper Yangtze Garrison, which controlled several brigades and a division in Western Hubei. Lu Yongxiang governed Zhejiang through the Zhejiang provincial army and He Fenglin served as the Military Commissioner of Shanghai. Chen Shufan, the nominal governor of Shaanxi, controlled most of the South of his province with several local armies under his command. The military governors of Shandong were subservient to Duan Qirui, although it was plagued by intra-clique rivalries due to Jin Yunpeng's influence in the province and Jin's rivalry with Xu Shuzheng, who had subordinates such as Ma Liang and Qu Yingguang in the province. Ni Sichong, governor of Anhui, was a major contributor to the Anhui Clique, and he controlled two armies in Anhui and Northern Jiangsu. The provinces of Gansu, Fujian and Zhang Jingyao's Hunan were reliant on the Anhui Clique and led by Anhui Clique governors. Other provinces such as Xinjiang, Shanxi, and Fengtian were politically associated with the Anhui Clique during 1918–1919 as their provincial delegations in the National Assembly were part of the Anfu Club.

The Anhui Clique armies fought during the Constitutional Protection War, Zhili-Anhui War of 1920 and the Occupation of Outer Mongolia.

The Anhui Clique has received aid in the form of military equipment, advisors and more mostly from the Japanese, they had also received aid from the French and British, most notably in the form of warplanes and armoured cars.

The Anhui Clique purchased weaponry such as bolt-action rifles and ammunition from the United States, France and others.

France provided planes used in the bombing of the Forbidden City.

In March 1924, Zhili clique general Sun Chuanfang's forces defeated two Anhui clique generals in Fujian, gaining control of that province. Lu Yongxiang, the Anhui clique general in Shanghai, allowed the defeated Anhui clique generals and their troops to enter Shanghai. The Zhili clique governor of Jiangsu, General Qi Xieyuan, deemed this to be a violation of the agreement that Shanghai would remain neutral. On 3 September, his forces attacked the Anhui forces in Zhejiang and Shanghai, beginning the Jiangsu–Zhejiang War. The war ended on 12 October 1924 with an Anhui defeat and the Zhili clique gained control of Zhejiang and Shanghai.

== Known members ==
Name	Active years	Notes
Duan Qirui 段祺瑞	1916–1926	Premier: 1913, 1916–18; President: 1924–26; Negotiated the Nishihara Loans with Japan in exchange for Shandong Concession, triggering the May Fourth Movement
Xu Shuzheng 徐樹錚	1916–1925	Duan Qirui's right-hand man Led expedition that reconquered Mongolia and temporarily brought it back under control
Duan Zhigui 段芝貴	1916–1925	Minister of War: 1917–1919
Jin Yunpeng 靳雲鵬	1916–1920	Premier: 1919–1921
Wang Yitang 王揖唐	1916–1926	Chairman of the House of Representatives 1918–1920
Lu Yongxiang 盧永祥	1916–1926	Ruler of Zhejiang and Shanghai, his refusal to hand over Shanghai caused the Second Zhili–Fengtian War
He Fenglin (何丰林)	1916–1926	Military Commissioner of Shanghai: 1919–1924; Subordinate of Lu Yongxiang
Zhang Jingyao 張敬堯	1917–1920	Governor of Hunan noted for his exceptional brutality Assassinated in 1933 after he became involved with the Japanese plot to enthrone Puyi as emperor of Manchukuo
Wu Guangxin 吳光新	1917–1926	Commander of the Upper Yangtze River Garrison: 1917–1920; Governor of Hunan: 1920
Ni Sichong 倪嗣衝	1916–1920	Governor of Anhui Province 1917–1920
Qu Tongfeng (曲同豊)	1916–1926	Commander of the 1st Division of the Border Defence Army/National Stabilisation Army: 1919–1920
Chen Shufan 陳樹藩	1916–1922	Governor of Shaanxi: 1916–1921
Zhang Guangjian (張廣建)	1916–1920	Governor of Gansu: 1914–1920
Li Houji 李厚基	1916–1921	Governor of Fujian: 1914–1923
Yang Shande 杨善德	1917–1919	Governor of Zhejiang: 1917–1919
Wang Yongquan 王永泉	1917–1923	Division Commander stationed in Fujian; Governor of Fujian: 1922
Ma Liang 马良	1917–1919	Commander of the 2nd Division of the Border Defence Army/National Stabilisation Army: 1919–1920
Zheng Shiqi 鄭士琦	1916–1925	Military governor of Shandong (1923–25) and Anhui (1925).
Yang Yuting 杨宇霆	1918–1920	Chief of Staff of the Fengtian Army Headquarters in Tianjin; Staff Officer of the Northwest Frontier Defence Army

== See also ==
- Warlord Era
- List of Warlords
- History of the Republic of China
- Huai Army, also known as the Anhui Army
