= Wang Yitang =

Chinese politician and military commander (1877–1948)

Wang Yitang 王揖唐
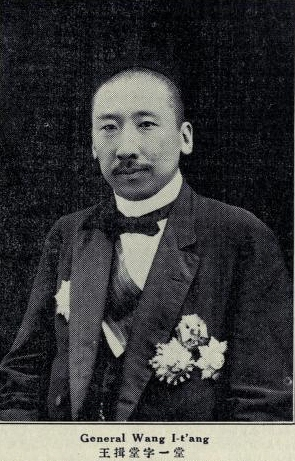
- Wang Yitang (Who's Who in China 3rd ed., 1925)
- Born: 17 October 1877; Hefei, Anhui, Qing China
- Died: 10 September 1948 (aged 70); Beiping, Republic of China
- Citizenship: Chinese
- Education: Tokyo Shinbu Gakko; Hosei University
- Political party: Anfu Club
- Other political affiliations: Anhui Clique
- Awards: Order of Rank and Merit; Order of the Precious Brilliant Golden Grain; Order of Wen-Hu

Wang Yitang (Chinese: 王揖唐; pinyin: Wáng Yītáng; Wade–Giles: Wang I-T'ang; October 17, 1877 – September 10, 1948) was a politician and military leader in the Qing Dynasty and Republic of China. He belonged to the Anhui clique and formed the Anfu Club (安福俱樂部). Later he became an important politician in the Provisional Government of the Republic of China and the Reorganized National Government of the Republic of China (Wang Jingwei regime). His former name was Zhiyang (志洋) and his courtesy names were Shenwu (慎吾) and Shengong (什公). Later, his name was changed to Geng (賡) while his courtesy name was changed to Yitang (一堂). He was also known by his art name Yitang (揖唐). He was born in Hefei, Anhui.

== Biography ==
=== In the end of the Qing Dynasty ===
A native of Hefei in Anhui Province, Wang Yitang passed the imperial examination in 1904 for the highest degree jinshi; however, he hoped to study about the military. In September he was sent on a government scholarship to Japan, where he attended the Tokyo Shimbu Academy, a military preparatory school. After graduating he entered the Imperial Japanese Army’s 9th Artillery Regiment based in Kanazawa; however, he found that military life was not to his liking, so he transferred to Hosei University.

He returned to China in 1907. After that he successively held the positions of Director of the Department for Military Affairs (兵部主事), Military Counselor to the office for the Viceroy of Three Northeast Provinces (on that time, the Viceroy was Xu Shichang), Commander of the 1st Brigade of the Jilin Army (吉林陸軍第1協統統領) and Councilor to the Training Office of the Jilin. From 1909 he visited the Empire of Russia and the United States as a military attaché.

=== In the Anhui clique ===
After the Xinhai Revolution broke out, Wang--through the introduction of Xu Shichang--joined the secretariat of Yuan Shikai. In 1912 he successively belonged to several political parties: Minshe (民社), Gonghe Cujinhui (共和促進會), Unity Party (Tongyidang; 統一黨) and Republican Party (Gonghedang; 共和黨). In 1913 he was elected to the National Assembly as the representative for Tibet. In May the United Party, Democratic Party (Minzhudang; 民主黨) and Republican Party merged, becoming the Progressive Party and Wang was appointed Director. In May 1914 he was appointed a member of the State Council. In August 1915 he was appointed Civil Governor of Jilin. In April 1916 he became Minister of the Interior, and held that post until the end of June.

Following the death of Yuan Shikai, Wang joined Duan Qirui's Anhui clique. The next November Duan formed the New Provisional Senate (臨時參議院), with Wang as President. On March 8, 1918, he and Xu Shuzheng established the Anfu Club, which engaged in political works for the Anhui clique. On August 2 Wang was appointed Chairman of the House of Representatives and led the "Anfu Parliament" (安福國會). However, in July 1920 the Anhui clique was defeated by the Zhili clique in the Zhili–Anhui War, and the Anfu Club and Anfu Parliament were dissolved. Wang fled into exile in Japan, where he remained for the next four years.

In November 1924 Duan Qirui became Provisional Chief Executive (臨時執政) following the Beijing Coup, and Wang returned to Beijing. From November 1924 to April 1925 he was Military Governor of Anhui. He resisted the Kuomintang’s Northern Expedition; however, with the collapse of the Beiyang Government in 1928, Wang fled to the foreign settlement in Tianjin and sought asylum within the protection of the Japanese Concession.

=== In the provisional governments ===
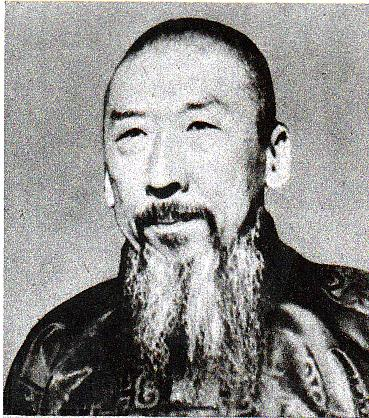
Wang Yitang (around 1940)

In 1931 the Nationalist Government offered Wang a political settlement; later he successively held the positions of Member of the Beiping Political Affairs Readjustment Commission (駐平政務整理委員會), Member of the Hebei–Chahar Political Council, General Manager of the Tianjin Financial Bank (天津匯業銀行總經理), etc. Following the start of the Second Sino-Japanese War, Wang Kemin established the Provisional Government of the Republic of China in December 1937. Wang Yitang successively held the positions of Executive Member of the Political Commission (議政委員會常務委員), Minister for Relief, and Minister of the Interior. In March 1940 the collaborationist Reorganized National Government of the Republic of China was established by Wang Jingwei, and Wang Yitang was appointed Minister of the Examination Yuan and a member of the North China Political Council (華北政務委員會). From June 1940 to February 1943 he served as Chairman of the North China Political Council.

Following the surrender of Japan in World War II, and the subsequent collapse of the Reorganized National Government of the Republic of China, Wang Yitang was arrested by Chiang Kai-shek's men at a hospital in Beijing on December 5, 1945. At first it was believed that he was seriously ill, so the authorities decided not to continue prosecution on charges of treason. However, when it was found that he was only faking illness, his trial as a hanjian resumed from September 1946. He was sentenced to death by Hebei High Court, and again by the Nanjing Capital High Court.

Wang Yitang was executed by firing squad at Beiping on September 10, 1948.
