= Chen Shufan =

Chinese general

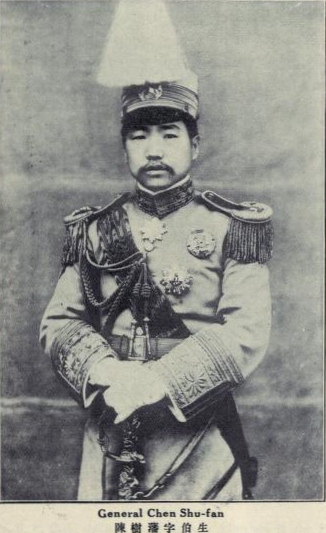
- Born: 1885; Ankang, Shaanxi province, Qing Empire
- Died: November 2, 1949; Hangzhou, Zhejiang province
- Allegiance: Anhui clique
- Battles / wars: Zhili–Anhui War
- Awards: Order of Rank and Merit; Order of Wen-Hu

Chen Shufan (Chinese: 陈树藩) (1885 – November 2, 1949) was a Chinese general active during the early Republican period in China. He was a prominent general of the Anhui Clique and won the Order of Rank and Merit and Order of Wen-Hu.

== Biography ==
Born in Ankang County, Xingan Prefecture, Shaanxi, he went to the local military academy in 1905 before transferring to Baoding Military Academy in 1906. In 1910, after graduating from the military academy, he returned to Shaanxi and was commissioned an officer. He joined the Tongmenghui in 1911, and on October 22 of that year participated in the Xi'an uprising of the Xinhai Revolution. Despite Yuan Shikai's attempt to win him over through a rank of nobility, at the beginning of the National Protection War in December 1915 Chen joined the National Protection Movement in opposing Yuan and declared Shaanxi's independence from the Empire of China. Chen joined the Anhui clique after Yuan's death in June 1916. In 1917 he was opposed by Hu Jingyi, a former supporter, for his opposition to the Constitutional Protection Movement. Chen made peace with Hu after Hu tried to seek assistance from Yu Youren, who was acting on behalf of the southern government opposed to Beiyang. In 1921 he was forced out of Shaanxi by Feng Yuxiang of the Zhili clique in the aftermath of his defeat in the Zhili–Anhui War. He fled to Sichuan but was later forced out by the Sichuan clique that ruled the area. He fled to Tianjin, taking an interest in Buddhism and spending some time in Shanghai. During the Second Sino-Japanese War he refused to be a collaborator and fled back to Sichuan. He went to Hangzhou after the Chinese victory and opposed Chiang Kai-shek's decision to renew the Chinese Civil War between the Kuomintang and the Chinese Communist Party. He died in Hangzhou shortly after it was taken by the Communists.
