= Qu Tongfeng =

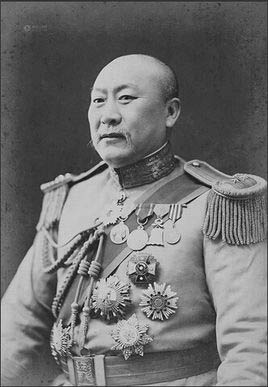
- Born: 1873; Yantai, Shandong, Qing Empire
- Died: 1929 (aged 55–56); Tianjin, Republic of China
- Military career
- Allegiance: Qing Dynasty (1889–1911) (Republic of China (1912–1949)) Beiyang government (1911–1929)
- Branch: Beiyang Fleet; Anhui clique
- Service years: 1889 – 1929
- Rank: General
- Unit: Dingyuan
- Conflicts: First Sino–Japanese War: Battle of the Yalu River; Xinhai Revolution; Zhili–Anhui War
- Awards: Order of Rank and Merit; Order of the Precious Brilliant Golden Grain; Order of Wen-Hu; Order of the Sacred Treasure

Qu Tongfeng, (simplified Chinese: 曲同丰; traditional Chinese: 曲同豐; pinyin: Qǔ Tóngfēng; Wade–Giles: Ch'ü^{3} T'ung^{2}-feng^{1}; IPA: [t͡ɕǔ tʊ́ŋfə̄ŋ]; 1873–1929) was a general who served Yuan Shikai and the Anhui clique.

Qu Tongfeng was born in Fushan County, now in Yantai, Fushan District of Shandong. At age 16 he joined the Beiyang Fleet and served as second-class engineer on the Dingyuan during the First Sino–Japanese War. When the ship was sunk in the Battle of the Yalu River he escaped into the sea and was rescued. He went on to get a higher education and was sent to the Imperial Japanese Army Academy in 1903, graduating in 1904. Upon his return he was given an infantry unit command. In 1907 he was given posts in the Beiyang Army in charge of drill, discipline and inspection. In 1910 he was promoted to command of a unit in Yunnan.

Following the 1911 Wuchang Uprising Qu rose in revolt, becoming commander of the 2nd Division. In 1912 he was promoted to Major General. He was President of the Baoding Military Academy from 1913 to 1915. He was removed after opposing Yuan Shikai's capitulation to the Twenty-One Demands. Following the death of Yuan Shikai, Qu was given military commands again by the Anhui clique.

In 1920 he was the Anhui army front-line commander-in-chief in the Zhili–Anhui War. Wu Peifu led the Zhili clique army in a daring maneuver to capture the Anhui army headquarters after first outflanking the enemy, capturing Qu and many of his fellow officers. He was released from captivity in 1922.

Qu Tongfeng was shot in Tianjin in 1929.
