= Wu Guangxin =

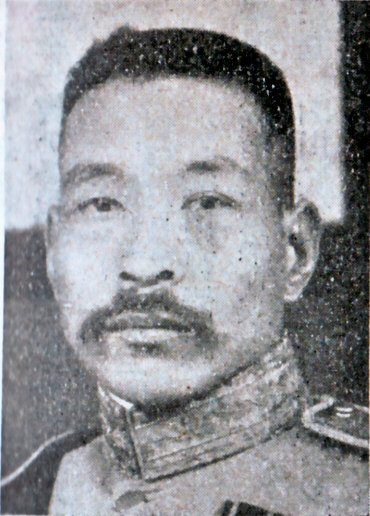
Wu Guangxin

Wu Guangxin, (simplified Chinese: 吴光新; traditional Chinese: 吳光新; pinyin: Wú Guāngxīn; Wade–Giles: Wu^{2} Kuang^{1}-hsin^{1}; IPA: [ú ku̯ɑ̄ŋɕīn]; 1881–1939) Army general of the Republic of China. Military and Civil governor of Hunan in 1920. Army Minister 1924–1925.

Wu Guangxin was born in 1881 in Hefei, Anhui, China. He graduated from the Japanese Army Military Academy in 1904 and the War College in 1910. A career officer in the Beiyang Army, he had close professional ties to his brother-in-law Duan Qirui. After the Republic of China was established, he held command of the 20th Division. In 1916 he was given the task of re-establishing northern military control over Yuezhou in northern Hunan. In August 1917 Duan obtained Feng Guozhang's appointment of Wu as Commander-in-Chief of the Upper Yangtze River and concurrently Inspector of Sichuan, with orders to advance into Sichuan to resolve its internal conflicts.

In January 1918, during the 1st Constitutional Protection War, Wu--who had retreated from Sichuan to the Sichuan-Hubei border--attacked Shi Xingchuan and Li Tiancai's army from the west along the Yangtze. Caught between Wu and Wang Zhanyuan in the Wuhan area, Shi and Li were defeated. Hubei independent forces ceased to be a serious threat to Beiyang power in Hubei. In 1920 Wu became Military and Civil governor of Hunan. During the Zhili–Anhui War he was captured and detained as one of the Anhui clique's leaders by Wang Zhanyuan, but in 1921 he was released.

Due to the victory of Zhang Zuolin and Feng Yuxiang in the Second Zhili–Fengtian War, Zhang Zuolin named Duan Qirui as the new Chief Executive of the nation on November 24, 1924. Wu was appointed as Army Minister and in December 1924 inspector general. In February 1925 he was appointed Reconstruction Conference Association president.

Due to the March 18 Massacre, Feng Yuxiang again revolted against the Fengtian clique and deposed Duan, who was forced to flee to Zhang's protection, and Wu--now deposed--went into seclusion in Shanghai. He died of illness on November 15, 1939, in Shanghai.

== Sources ==
- Edward A. Mccord, The Power of the Gun, The Emergence of Modern Chinese Warlordism, University of California Press, Berkeley · Los Angeles · Oxford © 1993 The Regents of the University of California
- Arthur Waldron, From War to Nationalism: China's Turning Point, 1924-1925, Cambridge University Press, 1995
