= Lu Jianzhang =

- Born: 1862; Mengcheng, Anhui, Qing dynasty
- Died: June 14, 1918 (aged 55–56); Tianjin, Republic of China
- Allegiance: Qing dynasty; Beiyang clique; Zhili clique
- Battles / wars: Bai Lang Rebellion

Lu Jianzhang (Chinese: 陆建章; 1862 – June 14, 1918) was a Chinese military officer and warlord active during the late Qing dynasty period and the early phases of the Warlord Era in China.

== Biography ==
He enlisted in the Huai Army in 1881, before joining the New Army in 1895. He entered the military academy at Tianjin in 1885, becoming an instructor in 1887. In 1905, he was put in charge of New Army units from Shandong and Guangdong provinces. In 1911, he was sent to suppress the Wuchang Uprising, but later went supported the revolutionaries through the influence of relative Feng Yuxiang. In 1912, he participated in the formation of the Beiyang government of the Republic of China. In June 1914, he was sent to Shaanxi Province to suppress the Bai Lang Rebellion. From December 1915 to 1916, he fought in the National Protection War in defense of the Empire of China, but refused to support Zhang Xun's restoration of the Qing dynasty in July 1917.

== Death ==
Lu was murdered in Tianjin by Fengtian clique member Yang Yuting and Anhui Clique member Xu Shuzheng. An opponent of Duan Qirui and the policies of the Anhui clique, Lu was shot in an ambush a day after arriving in Tianjin from Shanghai. His death further strained relations between the Zhili and Anhui cliques, eventually leading to the Zhili–Anhui War of 1920. In 1925, Feng Yuxiang, his relative, killed Xu in revenge for Lu's murder.
