= Hsu Dau-lin =

Chinese legal scholar and historian

- 徐道鄰
- Born: December 4, 1907; Tokyo, Japan
- Died: December 24, 1973 (aged 66); Seattle, Washington, U.S.
- Education: Heidelberg University; Goethe University Frankfurt; University of Geneva; University of Berlin (LLD)
- Occupations: Government Official, Scholar

Hsu Dau-lin (Chinese: 徐道鄰; pinyin: Xú Dàolín; December 4, 1907 – December 24, 1973) was a Japanese-born Taiwanese legal scholar who made substantial contributions to the study of Tang and Song law and, especially for new republican states, of constitutional law. He devoted his prime years to the service of China as government official and as diplomat, and spent his later years teaching Chinese legal history in Taiwan, and Chinese literature and philosophy in America.

== Biography ==
He was born on December 4, 1907, in Tokyo, Japan. His father was Xu Shuzheng, a student of military science in Tokyo at the time. His mother was Hsia Hsuan (夏萱 Xia Xuan) (1878–1956). His siblings included his eldest brother Hsu Shen-chiao (徐審交 Xu Shenjiao) and a younger sister, Hsu Ying (徐桜).

The family returned to China in 1910, where Hsu received his classical education under the instruction of a private tutor. His family shared a love of kunqu, an old form of Chinese opera, and Hsu played the bamboo flute. After studying German, he travelled to Germany to further his education, and studied at the universities of Heidelberg, Frankfurt, and Geneva. In 1929, he began graduate study in law at the University of Berlin. Fellow students and friends, Stephan Kuttner and Hellmut Wilhelm, introduced Hsu to Barbara Schuchard, in Berlin. Hsu graduated in 1931 with a thesis entitled Das Geltungs-problem im Verfassungsrecht (The Problem of Validity in Constitutional Law), a document that is still used in constitutional law classes in Japan.

He returned to China in 1932 to take a government post, and became personal secretary to Chiang Kai-shek. The following year, Barbara Schuchard joined him in China and they were married. In 1937, he lived in Hsikou (Xikou), as he was assigned as a tutor to Chiang Kai-shek's 27-year-old son, Chiang Ching-kuo, who had just returned from 12 years in Russia. In 1938, they moved to Rome, where Dau-lin served as the Chargé d'affaires in Italy until 1941. In 1942 he became a department director in the Ministry of Personnel. In 1945 he received a cabinet-level position as Director of Political Affairs of the Executive Yuan. He resigned this post in November 1945 in order to formally accuse Feng Yuxiang of his father's (Xu Shuzheng's) assassination, without appearance of political bias. While he served as a professor of law at National Central University in Chungking (1944–45), he published the book Introduction to Tang Law. He was professor and dean of the Law School at National Tungchi University (Tongji University) in Shanghai from 1947 to 1949. He served briefly as Secretary-General of Taiwan Province in 1947 and finally as Secretary-General of his home province of Jiangsu in 1948–1949 (while on leave from the university).

His wife and three children left Shanghai in 1949 and immigrated to the United States. After the Communist government came to power, Dau-lin travelled through Hong Kong to Taiwan. Because of the long separation from his family, he and his first wife divorced. He served as a professor of law at National Taiwan University from 1954 to 1958, teaching both Chinese and Roman law. He met and married Ye Miao-ying "Nancy" in Taiwan. From 1958 to 1962, he served as professor and department chair in political science at Tunghai University in Taichung, Taiwan. During this time he published a biography of his father, The Life of General Hsu Shu-tseng (in Chinese, Commercial Press).

In 1962, Hsu immigrated with his wife and two children to the U.S. to take a research faculty position at the University of Washington, joining his former colleague and friend, Hellmut Wilhelm, and his brother-in-law, Li Fang-kuei. Hsu left in 1965 to work at Columbia University and Michigan State University, before returning to become a teaching faculty member at the University of Washington in 1970. In his later years, his research focused on law in the Sung Dynasty. He died suddenly on December 24, 1973, in Seattle, Washington. Although he published throughout his career, his German and Chinese works have not been translated into English, and he was not as well-recognized in the US as he was in China and Japan.

== Selected works ==
- Hsu Dau-lin. 1929. "Die Chinesische Liebe. [In German]" Sinica 6.
- Hsu Dau-lin. 1945. Introduction to T'ang Law. [In Chinese] Chungking: Chung-hua. 94 pp.
- Hsu Dau-lin. 1957. Introduction to Semantics. [In Chinese] Hong Kong: Union Publishers. 218 pp.
- Hsu Dau-lin. 1959. "The Benevolent Government of the Early Chou Emperors [In Chinese]." Tunghai Journal. I
- Hsu Dau-lin. 1962. The Life of General Hsu Shu-tseng.[In Chinese] Taipei: Commercial Press. 331 pp.
- Hsu Dau-lin. 1970. "Crime and Cosmic Order." Harvard Journal of Asiatic Studies 30 (October):111-125.
- Hsu Dau-lin. 1970–71. "The Myth of the 'Five Human Relations' of Confucius." Monumenta Serica, 29 (1970–71): 27–37.
