= Zhang Jingyao =

Chinese general and warlord (1881–1933)

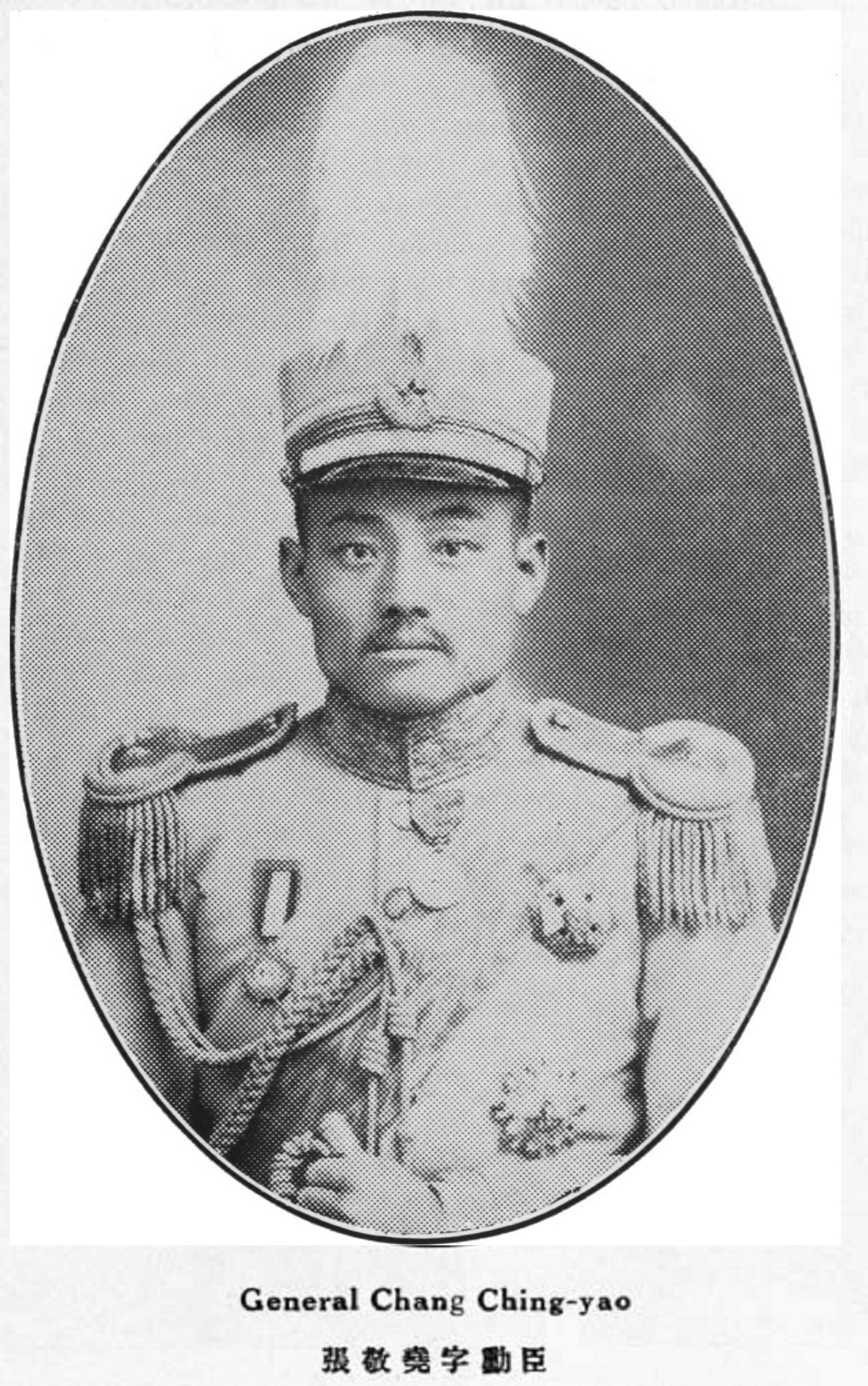
- Born: 1881; Anhui, Qing Empire
- Died: 1933 (aged 51–52); Beijing, Republic of China
- Military career
- Commands: Beiyang Army

Zhang Jingyao (simplified Chinese: 张敬尧; traditional Chinese: 張敬堯; pinyin: Zhāng Jìngyáo, IPA: [ʈ͡ʂɑ̄ŋ t͡ɕìŋi̯ɑ́ʊ̯]; 1881 – 1933), was a Chinese general and the military governor of Chahar and later Hunan Province. He was one of China's most notorious warlords, known for his troops' atrocities and the looting of Hunan during his administration. He was removed from office for his abuses and assassinated in 1933 for his involvement in helping the Empire of Japan attempt to establish the monarchy of Puyi in northern China.

== Life ==
Born in 1881, Zhang joined the Beiyang Army, rising to the rank of general, and then was part of the Anhui clique. He was Military Governor of Chahar Province from October 18, 1917, to March 29, 1918. He was then given the post of Military Governor of Hunan province in March 1918. While he was governor, his troops committed many atrocities including the killing of civilians, robbing the wealthy, and rape. He was also accused of reducing the province to a state of beggary.

In August 1919, he censored Mao Zedong's "Xiang-jiang River Commentary" magazine because of Mao's efforts to organize a movement to expel him from the governorship. Mao led a Hunan students' delegation to Peking, where he appealed nationwide for support and revealed Zhang's atrocities in Hunan Province.

At Yueyang on June 16, 1920, Zhang's troops murdered an American missionary, William A. Reimert. This provoked the intervention of the American gunboat Upshur, which sent ashore a landing party of one officer and 40 men on June 25 to protect the American mission. Two days later—when local tensions had eased—they were re-embarked. On June 29, Zhang was removed from office; the Chinese foreign office investigated the incident and expressed its profound regrets to the Americans. Zhang was later pardoned under obscure circumstances.

In 1933, the Empire of Japan began setting up a puppet government in northern China with Puyi as the ruling monarch. Zhang was involved in the preparations, having been provided with Japanese money. Because of this, he was later shot and killed by an assassin in Beijing's Grand Hotel.

== Awards and decorations ==
- Order of Rank and Merit
- Order of Wen-Hu

== See also ==
- Warlord Era

== Sources ==
- "Inside the Pale". Time Magazine. May 15, 1933. Archived from the original on January 5, 2008.
- Rulers: Chinese administrative divisions
- USS Upshur
