= Xu Shuzheng =

Chinese warlord (1880–1925)

- 徐樹錚
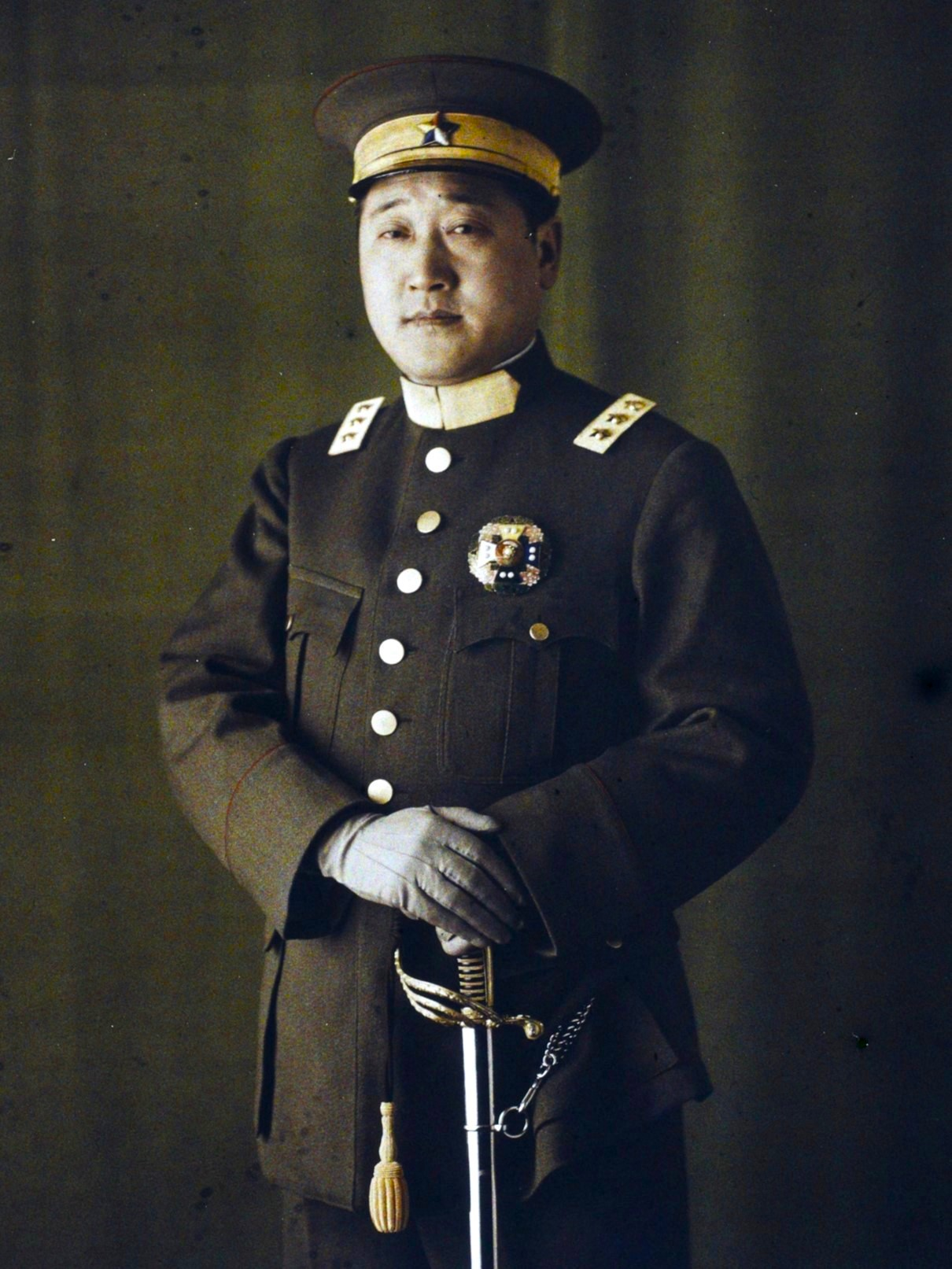
- Autochrome portrait by Georges Chevalier, 1925. Xu is wearing the Order of Rank and Merit.

Personal details
- Born: 11 November 1880 Xiao County, Jiangsu, Qing dynasty
- Died: 30 December 1925 (aged 45) Peking, Republic of China
- Party: Anhui clique
- Children: 6, including Hsu Dau-lin
- Education: Imperial Japanese Army Academy
- Occupation: Military officer
- Awards: Order of Rank and Merit; Order of the Precious Brilliant Golden Grain; Order of Wen-Hu; Order of the Sacred Treasure

Military service
- Allegiance: Qing Dynasty (Republic of China (1912–1949)) Republic of China
- Branch/service: New Army; Beiyang Army
- Rank: General
- Battles/wars: Occupation of Mongolia

Hsu Seu-Cheng or Xu Shuzheng (traditional Chinese: 徐樹錚; simplified Chinese: 徐树铮; pinyin: Xú Shùzhēng; Wade–Giles: Hsü Shu-Cheng; IPA: [ɕú ʂùt͡ʂə̄ŋ]) (11 November 1880 – 29 December 1925) was a Chinese warlord in Republican China. A subordinate and right-hand man of Duan Qirui, he was a prominent member of the Anhui clique.

== Early life ==
Xu was born in Xiao County, Jiangsu (now part of Anhui province), with a scholar family background. He was one of the youngest persons ever to pass the Imperial examinations. In 1905 he was accepted into the Japanese School of Land Army Officials, and returned to China in 1910. From 1911 to 1917 he served in the First Army in various positions on the general staff, such as chief of the Logistics Department, deputy chief of land forces and chief of land forces. In 1914 he founded a middle school called Cheng Da Middle School, which is the predecessor of today's Affiliated High School of the Capital Normal College.

In 1918 Xu founded the Anfu Club, the political arm of the Anhui clique, which then won three-fourths of the seats in the National Assembly. Later that year Xu executed Lu Jianzhang after discovering that Lu was trying to persuade Feng Yuxiang, Lu's nephew, to fight against the Anhui clique. This would lead to Xu's own assassination in 1925.

== Military career ==
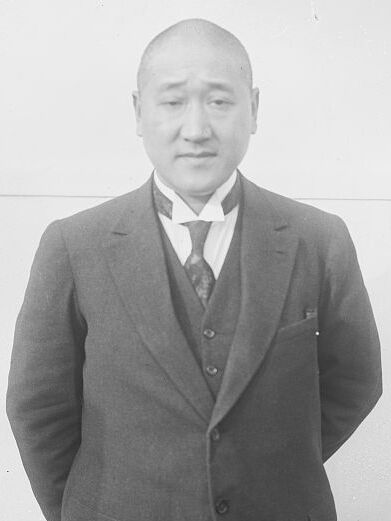
Xu Shuzheng

In 1919 Xu assumed command of the Northwest Frontier Defense Army, which invaded newly independent Outer Mongolia in October. On November 17 he forced Outer Mongolia to withdraw its declaration of autonomy, thus temporarily bringing Mongolia back under Chinese control. In 1920, after Duan fell from power, Xu lost his position and moved his forces back to confront his enemies. He was replaced in Mongolia by Chen Yi, and Mongolia became independent again in early 1921 when Chinese forces were defeated by the Russian–Mongol army commanded by General Baron Roman von Ungern-Sternberg. Xu's forces were defeated in the subsequent Zhili–Anhui War and he was forced to take shelter in the Japanese embassy.

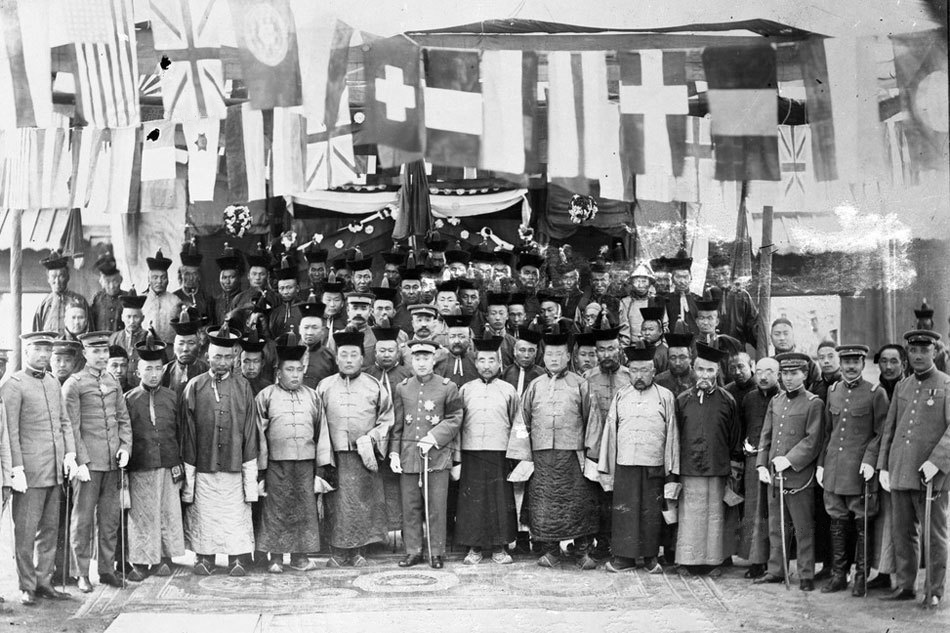
Xu Shuzheng and Mongolian Noyons in Khüree

In the early 1920s, Xu was sent to Italy as part of a Chinese diplomatic mission; a secondary purpose was to get him out of the country. He returned to China in 1924 after Duan's return as chief executive.

== Death ==
In December 1925, while traveling from Beijing to Shanghai by train, Xu was kidnapped by Zhang Zhijiang, a member of Feng Yuxiang's forces. He was assassinated at dawn the next day by Feng as revenge for the killing of Lu Jianzhang. This also deprived Feng's rival Duan of a powerful supporter. Xu was 45 years old.

== Personal life ==
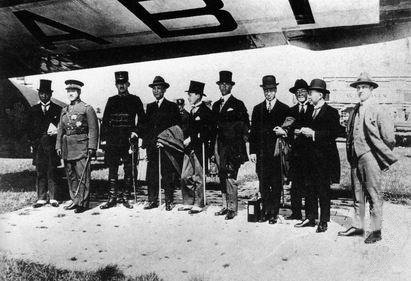
Xu Shuzheng (second from left) led a delegation to the Brussels Airport in Belgium, August 1925. The left one was Xu Daolin.

Xu had one wife and four concubines. His wife Xia Hongjun (夏红筠, also named Xia Xuan (夏萱)), died in Suzhou, Jiangsu Province, in 1955. They had four sons and two daughters. First son Hsu Shen-chiao (徐審交 Xu Shenjiao) and third son Hsu Dau-lin (徐道鄰, Xu Daolin) were active in Republic of China politics. Hsu Dau-lin wrote a biography, published in Chinese in 1962, entitled The Life of General Hsu Shu-tseng. Older daughter Hsu Ying Li (徐樱 Xu Ying, also named Xu Yinghuan (徐樱环)), wrote a biography of her mother and married the linguist Fang-Kuei Li. The other three died in childhood.

The four concubines were Shen Dinglan (沈定兰), Shen Shupei (沈淑佩, younger sister of Shen Dinglan), Wang Huicheng (王慧珵) and Ping Fangchun (平芳春). Xu had two daughters (Xu Pei (徐佩) and Xu Lan (徐兰)) with Shen Shupei, and two daughters (Xu Mei (徐美) and Xu Hui (徐慧)) with Wang Huicheng.

== Awards and decorations ==
- Order of Rank and Merit (China)
- Order of the Precious Brilliant Golden Grain (China)
- Order of Wen-Hu (China)
- Order of the Sacred Treasure (Japan)

== Sources ==
- 陈贤庆 (Chen Xianqing), 民国军阀派系谈 (The Republic of China Warlord Cliques Discussed), 2007 revised edition
- Edward A. McCord, The Power of the Gun: the Emergence of Modern Chinese Warlordism, Berkeley, University of California Press, 1993
- Arthur Waldron, From War to Nationalism, Cambridge, Cambridge University Press, 1995

== See also ==
- List of warlords and military cliques in the Warlord Era
- History of the Republic of China
