= He Fenglin =

Chinese general

He Fenglin 何豐林
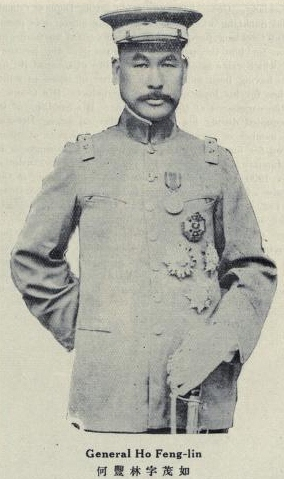

Minister of War
- In office June 1927 – June 1928
- Preceded by: Zhang Jinghui
- Succeeded by: Feng Yuxiang

Personal details
- Born: 1873 Pingyin, Shandong, Empire of China
- Died: 1935 (aged 61–62)
- Party: Anhui clique Fengtian clique

Military service
- Allegiance: Qing dynasty (Beiyang government) Republic of China
- Rank: General officer
- Battles/wars: First Sino-Japanese War; Boxer Rebellion; Xinhai Revolution; First Jiangsu-Zhejiang War

He Fenglin (simplified Chinese: 何丰林; traditional Chinese: 何豐林; pinyin: Hé Fènglín; Wade–Giles: Ho Feng-lin; courtesy name Maoru (茂如); 1873–1935) was a Chinese general and warlord. He belonged to the Anhui clique and the Fengtian clique, and later served as the Minister of War of the Republic of China.

== Biography ==
Born in Pingyin, Shandong, He Fenglin graduated the Beiyang Military Academy (北洋武備學堂), then entered the New Army (新建陸軍). Later he was promoted to be 15th regimental commander of the 8th Brigade, the 4th Division (第4鎮第8協第15標標統).

In May 1912 He Fenglin was promoted to be Commander of the 8th Brigade of the 4th Division. In next year he was transferred to Commander of the 7th Brigade of the 4th Division. When Yuan Shikai ascended to the throne in 1915, He Fenglin was awarded the title third-class Baron.

After the death of Yuan Shikai in 1916, He Fenglin belonged to the Anhui clique, commanded by Lu Yongxiang. In January 1917, He became Military Commissioner of the Ningtai (Ningbo and Taizhou), Zhejiang (浙江省寧臺鎮守使). In 1920, he was appointed acting Defense Commissioner of Shanghai (淞滬護軍使) and Commander of the 6th Mixed Brigade. In 1924, on the First Jiangsu-Zhejiang War (江浙戰爭), he participated as Commander of the 1st Army of the Shanghai United Army (浙滬聯軍第1軍司令). During the war, Lu was defeated by Qi Xieyuan (齊燮元) and Sun Chuanfang, so He also withdrew and escaped to Tianjin.

Later, he participated in the Fengtian clique. When Zhang Zuolin became Generalissimo, in June 1927, He Fenglin was catapulted to Minister of War, and also held the position of Supreme Commander of the Model Army Corps of the Anguojun (安國軍). In April 1927, he was appointed Presiding Judge of the Military Tribunal, and passed a death sentence (by hanging) on Li Dazhao, the founder of the Chinese Communist Party.

After the collapse of the Beijing Government in June of the next year, He Fenglin resigned from his posts and escaped to the Northeast. In 1931 he was appointed Chief of the Councilor of the Commander‐in‐Chief's Office, Northeast Border Defence Army (東北邊防軍司令長官首席參議).

He Fenglin died in 1935. In 1936, he was posthumously promoted to lieutenant general (陸軍中將銜).

== Footnotes ==
- "Pingyin Town" - "Introduction about People" (《平阴镇》 - 《人物简介》) The Website of the Information about Shandong Province (《山东省情网》)(The Website of the Office of the Shandong Local History (山东省地方史志办公室))
- Lai Xinxia (来新夏) (etc.) (2000). The History of Beiyang Warlords (北洋军阀史). Press of Nankai University (Nankai Daxue Chubanshe; 南开大学出版社). ISBN 7-310-01517-7.
- Xu Youchun (徐友春) (main ed.) (2007). Unabridged Biographical Dictionary of the Republic, Revised and Enlarged Version (民国人物大辞典 增订版). Hebei People's Press (Hebei Renmin Chubanshe; 河北人民出版社). ISBN 978-7-202-03014-1.
- Liu Shoulin (刘寿林) (etc.ed.) (1995). The Chronological Table of the Republic's Officer (民国职官年表). Zhonghua Book Company. ISBN 7-101-01320-1.
