= Ni Sichong =

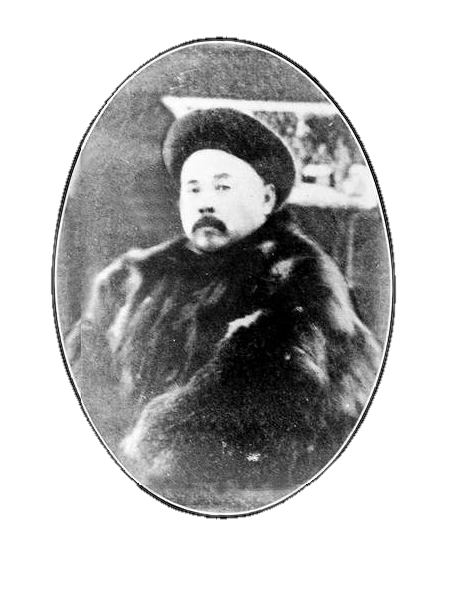
Ni Sichong

Ni Sichong, Duke of the First Rank (simplified Chinese: 倪嗣沖; traditional Chinese: 倪嗣衝; pinyin: Ní Sìchōng; Wade–Giles: Ni^{2} Si^{4}-ch'ung^{1}; IPA: [ní sìʈ͡ʂʰʊ̄ŋ]; 1868– July 1924) was a Chinese general and politician. He was one of the handful of Beiyang generals who along with Yang Du and others supported Yuan Shikai's Empire of China during the National Protection War. He was later part of the Anhui clique until resigning in 1920 due to the disastrous defeat in the Zhili–Anhui War. After that war, he engaged with the banking and mining industries.
