= Wang Yongquan =

Chinese general (1880–1942)

- 王永泉
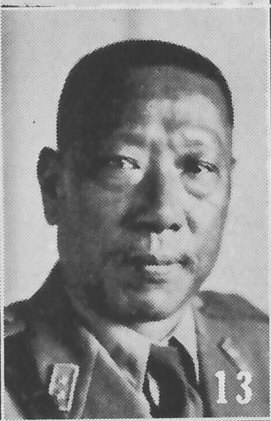

Personal details
- Born: 1880
- Died: 1942 (aged 61–62)

Military service
- Rank: General

Wang Yongquan (Chinese: 王永泉; pinyin: Wáng Yǒngquán; Wade–Giles: Wang Yung-ch'üan; 1880–1942) was a military general of the Republic of China. During the Warlord Era, he served as the military governor of Fujian province between 1918 and 1924. During the Second Sino-Japanese War, he served as Deputy Minister of Public Security in the Japanese occupation government.

== Life ==
Wang was born in Tianjin, Zhili province during the Qing dynasty. His family came from Jiangsu province. In 1902, Wang Yongquan went to Japan to study, and successively entered Chengcheng School and the 4th Engineering Department of the Army Non-commissioned Officer School. After graduating and returning to China, he served as the commander of the Engineering Battalion of the Eighth Town of the Army. After the founding of the Republic of China, he successively served as the engineer of the Army Department of the Beiyang government and the chief of staff of the Hunan Governor's Office. In 1917, he served as the deputy chief of the Fengtian Army Command and the commander of the supplementary brigade. In October 1918, due to the defeat of Li Houji in Fujian, the Fengtian Mixed Brigade led by Duan Qirui led the southward transfer of reinforcements from Luoyang to Fujian.

From 1918 to 1924, Wang was the military governor of Fujian province.

In January 1919, the supplementary brigade was renamed the 24th Mixed Brigade of the Central Army, and Wang Yongquan continued to serve as the brigade commander. The brigade was stationed in Fujian.

In the battle of Tong'an in March 1924, the troops of Wang Yongquan and his ally Zang Zhiping were completely defeated by Sun Chuanfang. The remnant army, led by Zang Zhiping and Yang Huazhao, defected to Jiangsu Governor Lu Yongxiang. Wang Yongquan fled to the French Concession in Shanghai.

In December 1937, the Provisional Government of the Republic of China was established. Wang Yongquan served as its Deputy Minister of Public Security under Qi Xieyuan. In March 1940, after the provisional government merged with the Wang Jingwei regime, Wang Yongquan withdrew from the political and military circles. Wang Yongquan died of illness in Beijing in 1942, at the age of 63.

== Bibliography ==
- Xu, Youchun, ed. (2007). The Enlarged Edition of the Great Dictionary of the Republic of China (in Chinese). Hebei People's Publishing House. ISBN 978-7-202-03014-1.
- Liu, Shoulin, ed. (1995). Chronology of Officials in the Republic of China (in Chinese). Zhonghua Book Company. ISBN 7-101-01320-1.
- Tōa Mondai Chōsakai (1941). The Most Recent Biographies of Chinese Dignitaries. Asahi Shimbun.
