= Anfu Club =

Chinese political group (f. 1918–20)

Anfu Club 安福俱樂部
- Leader: Wang Yitang
- Governing body: Anfu Club Executive Office
- Founded: March 8, 1918
- Dissolved: August 3, 1920
- Preceded by: Zhonghe Club
- Succeeded by: Jiwei Club (faction)
- Headquarters: Liang Shitang's Residence, Anfu Hutong, Beijing
- Ideology: State socialism Republicanism; Constitutionalism; Developmentalism
- National affiliation: Anhui clique

The Anfu Club (traditional Chinese: 安福俱樂部; simplified Chinese: 安福俱乐部; pinyin: Ānfú Jùlèbù) was a political organisation in China. It controlled the National Assembly of the Republic of China after the elections of 1918. On the order of President Xu Shichang, the organisation was forced to disband and its leaders subject to arrest warrants after the defeat of its patrons, the Anhui Clique, during the Zhili–Anhui War.

The club was formed on 8 March 1918 from the Zhonghe Club, a political group organised by Jin Yunpeng on the order of Duan Qirui on 27 March 1917. The Anfu Club was primarily organised by Duan's right-hand man, Xu Shuzheng, along with the politicians Wang Yitang, Zeng Yujun, Liu Enge and others. At its height, the organisation controlled roughly 330 seats in the National Assembly. The Club got its name from Anfu Hutong, the street on which the members meet.

== Political goals and organisation ==
Although officially not a political party, as the term was stigmatised following Yuan Shikai's disbandment of the Kuomintang, the Anfu Club operated as China's first party-state. It was a collective of senators, representatives and government bureaucrats who had their own party roles and positions which mirrored that of the Central Government. There was the Executive Office (干事部), led by Wang Yitang, the council (评议会), which Tian Yinghuang presided over, and the Public Policy Research Association (政务研究会) that was managed by Li Shengduo. The official goal of the Anfu Club was generate public policy, both foreign and internal. Their well-known foreign policies was the club's diplomacy with Japan. Affiliates of the Anfu Club, the New Communications Clique, were bureaucrats which organised loans from Japan to Club's patron, Duan Qirui. Moreover, diplomats selected by the Anfu Club were sent to Versailles to sign the Treaty of Versailles which ultimately caused the May Fourth Movement. However, the actual policy of signing the treaty and suppressing the subsequent student protests where directed by the president of the time, Xu Shichang, and the Anfu Club was blamed for the fiasco by Research Clique affiliated media, which became the widespread belief. Overall, the club's policy to Japan was largely friendly, but with the knowledge that Japan did not have the best interests in mind, which was exemplified by Xu Shuzheng's aid to Germany during the Siege of Qingdao. In terms of internal policy, the Anfu Club did not have an official ideology, but frequently made use of socialist rhetoric and watered down policies, such as the passing of progressive laws making Sunday a holiday, creating safety regulations for factories and compulsory pensions for workers. However, the club was very corrupt in obtaining power. The 1918 elections were fraught with fraud and vote-buying, and many provinces could not hold elections, such as Shaanxi and Henan due to conflict, and thus their military governors handpicked pro-Anfu officials to represent them in the National Assembly. Despite this, the club was known for its intra-party discipline, with many members of parliament being disappointed at the lack of bribes in exchange for votes.

The Anfu Club did not operate in isolation. They were formed on the orders of the Duan Qirui, the former premier and leader of the Anhui Clique. Duan was a military strongman who sought to unify China by force. The purpose of the club was ultimately to enable him in this pursuit. However, the Anfu Club was only a part of the Anhui Clique. The Jiwei Club, known as the "Moderate Militarists" by international observers and formed by Jin Yunpeng from Anfu Club defectors in the parliament and with support from President Xu Shichang opposed the Anfu Club in the Assembly, although still espoused loyalty to Duan. Moreover, the Anfu Club did not fully support the generals and military governors of the Anhui Clique, as demonstrated by the reduction of the Army Budget by 20% during 1919.
