= Chen Guangyuan =

Chinese military governor (1873–1939)

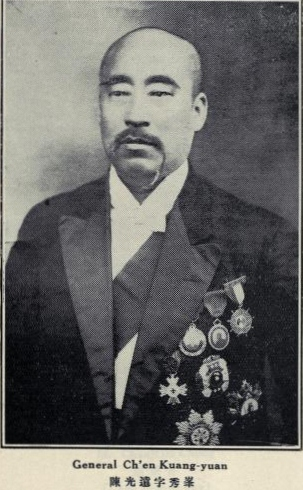
Portrait of Chen Guangyuan

Chen Guangyuan (Chinese: 陈光远; 1873–1939), sobriquet Xiufeng (秀峰), was a Zhili clique warlord and military governor of Jiangxi from August 6, 1917, to June 15, 1922.

He was a warlord of Cuihuangkou (崔黄口), now modern-day Tianjin. He was one of the three governors of Changjiang (长江三督).

During the 1911 Xinhai Revolution he was part of the First Army, which fought against the revolutionaries of the Wuchang Uprising, and commanded the 7th Brigade of the Beiyang Army's 4th Division. Col. Chen was among the officers to be awarded the title batulu, which meant "brave warrior" in the Manchu language, after Hankou was captured from the revolutionaries. He was later promoted to the position of 4th Division commander after his predecessor, Wu Fengling, had to step down on account of illness.

== Awards and decorations ==
- Order of Rank and Merit
- Order of the Precious Brilliant Golden Grain
- Order of Wen-Hu

== Sources ==
- Rulers: Chinese Administrative divisions, Jiangxi
- Esherick, Joseph (2013). China: How the Empire Fell. New York: Routledge, Taylor & Francis Group. ISBN 978-0415831017.
