= Zheng Shiqi =

- 鄭士琦
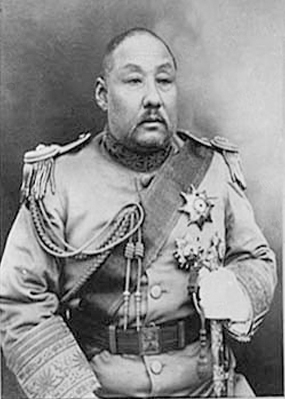
- Zheng Shiqi
- Born: 1873; Dingyuan, Anhui
- Died: 1935 (aged 61–62); Jinan, Shandong
- Military career
- Allegiance: Qing dynasty; Republic of China
- Rank: General
- Commands: General

Zheng Shiqi
- Traditional Chinese: 鄭士琦
- Simplified Chinese: 郑士琦
Transcriptions
Standard Mandarin
- Hanyu Pinyin: Zhèng Shìqí

Zheng Shiqi (1873 in Dingyuan, Anhui, China – 1935 in Jinan, Shandong, China), was a Chinese general, military governor of Shandong (1923–25) and Anhui (1925).

He was military Governor of Shandong from October 15, 1923 to April 24, 1925, when he became military governor of Anhui, serving until August 29, 1925. Zheng was an Anfu Club General.

During the Second Zhili–Fengtian War, as the Zhili army marched on Fengtian forces, On September 27, 1924, Zheng cabled Cao Kun, the Chinese president. Beijing sent 250,000 troops with modern weaponry against Zhang Zuolin's forces in Manchuria. Zheng said "Mukden will be captured in a matter of days".

Zheng, who was displeased Fengtian clique leader Zhang Zuolin made Zhang Zongchang commander in Shandong and transferred Zheng to the position of governor of Anhui, declared the province neutral. Fengtian forces were not allowed entry, and the railroad was torn up as part of the resistance plan.

During the Second Zhili–Fengtian War in 1924, as the Fengtian clique General Zhang Zongchang moved down the Tianjin-Pukou railway toward Jiangsu and eventually Shanghai, Zheng Shiqi declared Shandong's neutrality and forced Zhang's forces into retreat to Cangzhou. But when a government with Duan Qirui was installed as head of state of China, at the beginning of December Duan permitted Fengtian forces to occupy Jiangsu while guaranteeing Zheng's position at Shandong. Zheng then permitted Fengtian troops to pass, and on December 10 he abandoned his neutrality, joining the Fengtian forces.
