= Ma Liang =

Ma Liang may refer to:

== People ==
- Ma Liang (Three Kingdoms) (186–222), advisor to the warlord Liu Bei during the Three Kingdoms period
- Ma Xiangbo (1840–1939), also called Ma Liang, educator and scholar
- Ma Liang (general), general of the National Revolutionary Army
- Ma Liang (footballer) (born 1982), Chinese football player

== Fictional characters ==
- "Bomei" Ma Liang, character in the Chinese comic Ying Xiong Wu Lei
- The main character of the Chinese fairy tale Ma Liang and the Magic Brush (Chinese: 神笔马良)
