= Wang Zhanyuan =

Chinese warlord (1861-1934)

- 王占元
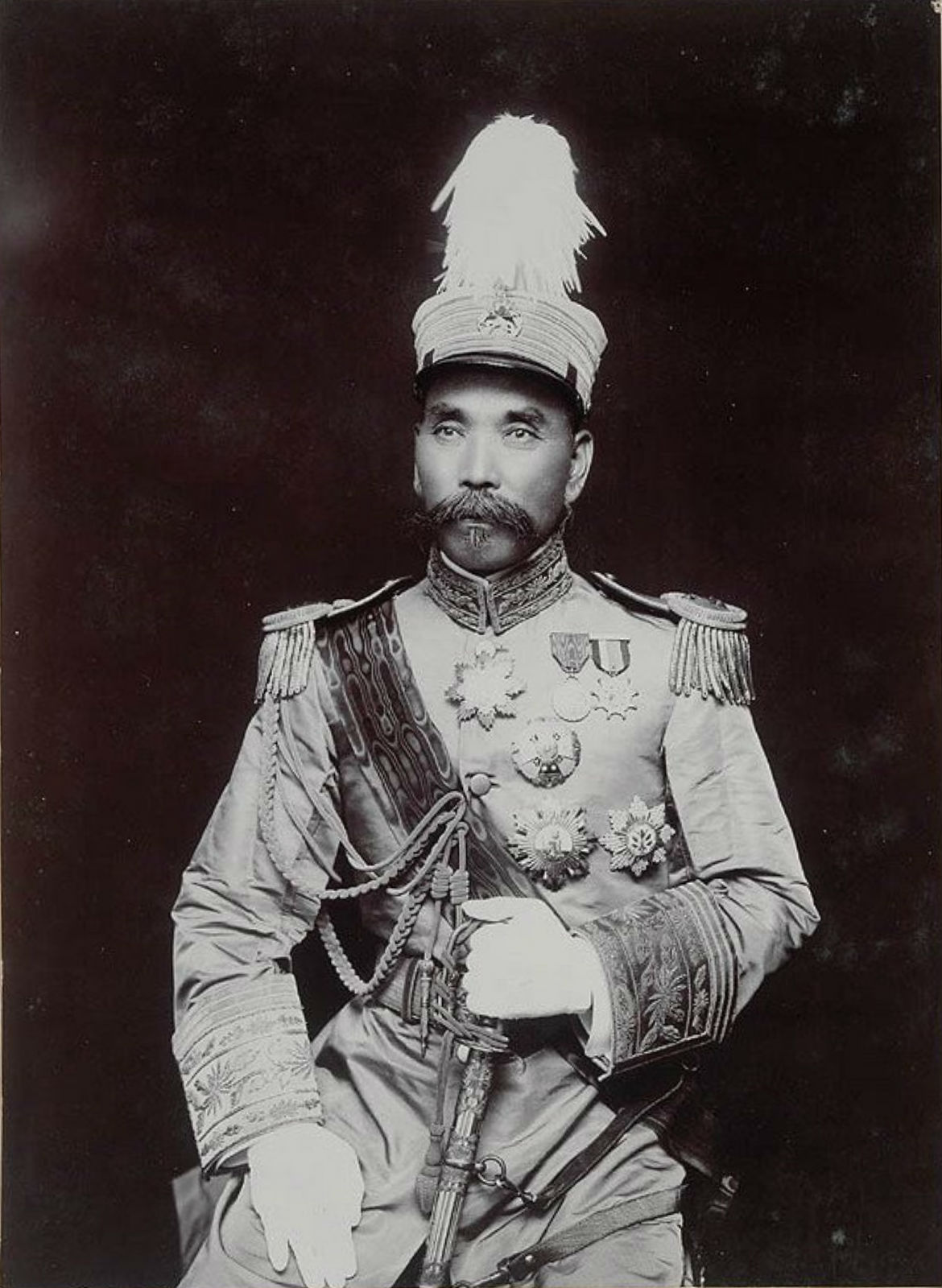
- Wang c. 1920s
- Born: February 20, 1861; Guantao County, Qing Empire
- Died: September 14, 1934; British concession of Tianjin
- Military career
- Allegiance: Qing Dynasty (Republic of China (1912–1949)) Republic of China
- Rank: General
- Conflicts: First Sino-Japanese War; Xinhai Revolution; Battle of Yangxia; Zhili–Anhui War
- Awards: Order of Rank and Merit; Order of the Precious Brilliant Golden Grain; Order of Wen-Hu

Wang Zhanyuan (Chinese: 王占元) (February 20, 1861 – September 14, 1934) was a Chinese general of the Warlord Era of China's Republican period, whose power base was in Hubei province.

== Biography ==
In October 1911, during the Xinhai Revolution, he was a colonel and assigned the First Army, which fought against the revolutionaries of the Wuchang Uprising and commanded the 3rd Brigade of the Beiyang Army's 2nd Division. He was among the officers to be awarded the title batulu, which meant "brave warrior" in the Manchu language, soon after the Qing army captured Hankou. On November 28 Col. Wang was made commander of the 2nd Division, replacing Ma Longbiao, who fell ill.

== Personal life ==
Wang Zhanyuan's daughter would marry Yuan Keding's son, Yuan Jiarong.

== Gallery ==
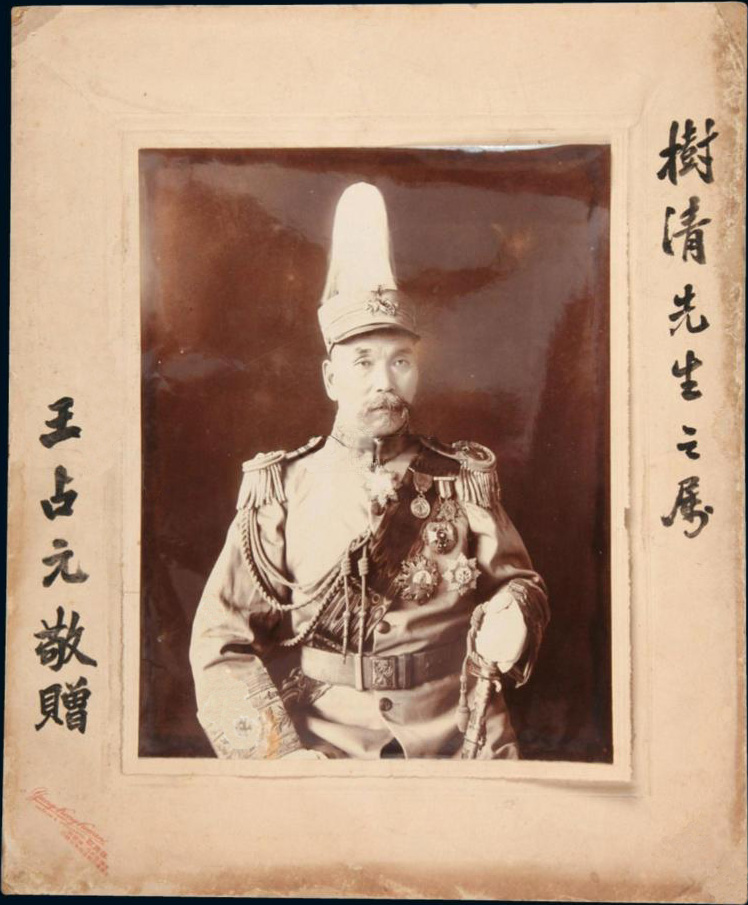
Wang Zhanyuan in military uniform

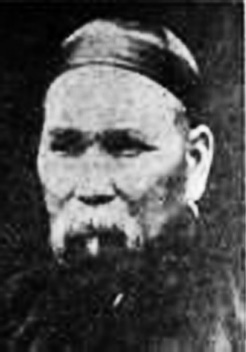
Wang Zhanyuan in later life

== Sources ==
=== Literature ===
- Esherick, Joseph (2013). China: How the Empire Fell. New York: Routledge, Taylor & Francis Group. ISBN 978-0415831017.
