= Zhili–Anhui War =

Part of the Warlord era

Zhili-Anhui War
- Part of the Warlord era
| Date | July 14, 1920 – July 23, 1920 |
| Location | Zhili (modern day Hebei), China |
| Result | Zhili and Fengtian victory: Destruction of the Anhui clique |

Belligerents
| (China) Zhili clique Fengtian clique | (China) Anhui clique |

Commanders and leaders
| Wu Peifu; Cao Kun; Zhang Zuolin | Duan Qirui; Qu Tongfeng; Xu Shuzheng |

Strength
| 50,000+ | 42,000 |

Casualties and losses
| Several thousand | 35,500 killed or deserted 6,500 surrendered |

Zhili–Anhui War
- Traditional Chinese: 直皖戰爭
- Simplified Chinese: 直皖战争
Transcriptions
Standard Mandarin
- Hanyu Pinyin: Zhíwǎn Zhànzhēng
- Wade–Giles: Chih-wan Chan-chêng

The Zhili–Anhui War was a 1920 conflict in the Republic of China between the Zhili and Anhui cliques for control of the Beiyang government.

== Prelude ==
Tensions between the two factions developed during the Constitutional Protection War of 1917. Duan Qirui, leader of the Anhui clique, favored aggressive action against the South, and after becoming premier of the state department (Guowu Zongli, 国务总理) advocated a military solution. His plan was to rid southern China of rival warlords, as well as unify the country. The Zhili clique favored compromise and negotiations, hoping to sway rival warlords to their side with financial and political support. Duan refused to acknowledge the Zhili's efforts and favored his own officers and politicians over others. After building a de facto private army using the Nishihara Loans, he used it to occupy Outer Mongolia. Feeling threatened, Manchuria's Fengtian clique allied with the Zhili clique and began courting those warlords in southwestern China who had previously been threatened by Duan's Anhui armies. Obtaining British and American backing, the Zhili and Fengtian cliques had President Xu Shichang dismiss Gen. Xu Shuzheng, the leader of the Mongolia expedition. Having publicly lost face and been undermined by a less powerful but still dangerous pair of ex-allies and hangers-on, Gen. Xu and Duan denounced the actions and prepared for war.

In November 1919 Zhili clique leader Gen. Wu Peifu met with representatives of Tang Jiyao and Lu Rongting at Hengyang, where they signed a treaty entitled "Rough Draft of the National Salvation Allied Army" (救国同盟军草约). This formed the basis of a true anti-Anhui clique alliance. In April 1920, while visiting a memorial service at Baoding for soldiers who died in Hunan, one-time presidential-candidate Cao Kun added more warlords to the anti-Anhui clique alliance, including the rulers of Hubei, Henan, Liaoning, Jilin, Heilongjiang, Jiangsu, Jiangxi and Zhili. The conflict became public as both sides began deploying for the coming war.

== Paoting-fu Telegram ==
Various Zhili and Fengtian generals—such as Cao Kun, Zhang Zuolin, Wang Zhanyuan, Li Shun, Chen Guangyuan, Zhao Ti and Ma Fuxiang—signed a denunciation of the Anhui clique and its political arm, the Anfu Club, which was led by Xu Shuzheng and Duan Qirui. This denunciation was circulated through a telegram called Paoting-fu on July 12, 1920.

== Strategies ==
In early July 1920 the Anhui clique gathered five divisions and four combined brigades to form the so-called National Stabilization Army (定国军), with Duan Qirui as its commander-in-chief. The army was deployed in two fronts, the western covering the regions of Zhuozhou, Laishui (涞水) and Gu'an (固安), while the eastern covered the regions of Liang (梁) Hamlet and Beijimiao (北极庙), just to the west of Yang (杨) Hamlet.

Zhili and allied forces gathered a division and nine combined brigades to form their own "Traitor Suppression Army" (讨逆军), with Wu Peifu as its front-line commander-in-chief. This, too, was deployed on two fronts, with an eastern zone in the region of Yang (杨) Hamlet and a western front in the region of Gaobei (高碑). Meanwhile, Zhang Zuolin ordered a detachment of his troops to enter Shanhaiguan, taking up positions at Machang (马厂) and Junliangcheng (军粮城).

== Battle ==
On July 14, 1920, the Anhui army attacked the Zhili army on both fronts. Zhili troops were forced to abandon Gaobei (高碑) and retreated. Two days later, with help from Japanese troops, the Anhui army also succeeded in taking Yang(杨) Hamlet, forcing Zhili forces to form a second line of defense in the region of Beicang(北仓). Here the Anhui army's advance was finally halted.

On July 17 Wu Peifu personally commanded the Zhili army's western front, performing a daring maneuver, outflanking the enemy and taking the western zone's Anhui headquarters. He captured the Anhui army's front-line commander-in-chief Qu Tongfeng (曲同丰) and many of his officers, including the 1st Division commander. After taking the town of Zhuozhou, Wu pursued the retreating enemy toward Beijing. With the exception of the 15th Division, the remainder of the Anhui army on the western front was annihilated. On the same day the Fengtian army attacked the Anhui eastern front. Upon learning of the collapse of the western zone, Anhui's eastern commander, chief of staff Gen. Xu Shuzheng, fled Langfang to Beijing, leaving his troops to surrender to the combined might of the Fengtian and Zhili cliques.

On July 19, 1920, Duan Qirui realized the fight was over and resigned from his post. On July 23 the combined Fengtian and Zhili cliques entered Nanyuan (南苑) for the takeover of Beijing, concluding with the defeat and surrender of the Anhui clique.

== Conclusion ==
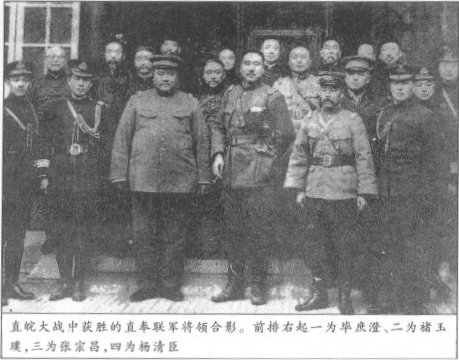
A group photo of the generals of the Zhili-Fengtian United Army after Zhili-Anhui War

Slightly more than a week of fighting led to the unexpected defeat of the Anhui clique and the permanent breakup of the Beiyang Army. Wu Peifu was nationally credited as the strategist behind the Zhili clique's victory, while the Fengtian clique provided token support and were allowed to form a joint government, an arrangement which would last until the First Zhili-Fengtian War in 1922.

== See also ==
- List of battles of the Chinese Civil War
- National Revolutionary Army
- Chinese Civil War
- Warlord Era
