= Order of Wen-Hu =

Former Republic of China award

Order of Wen-Hu 文虎勳章
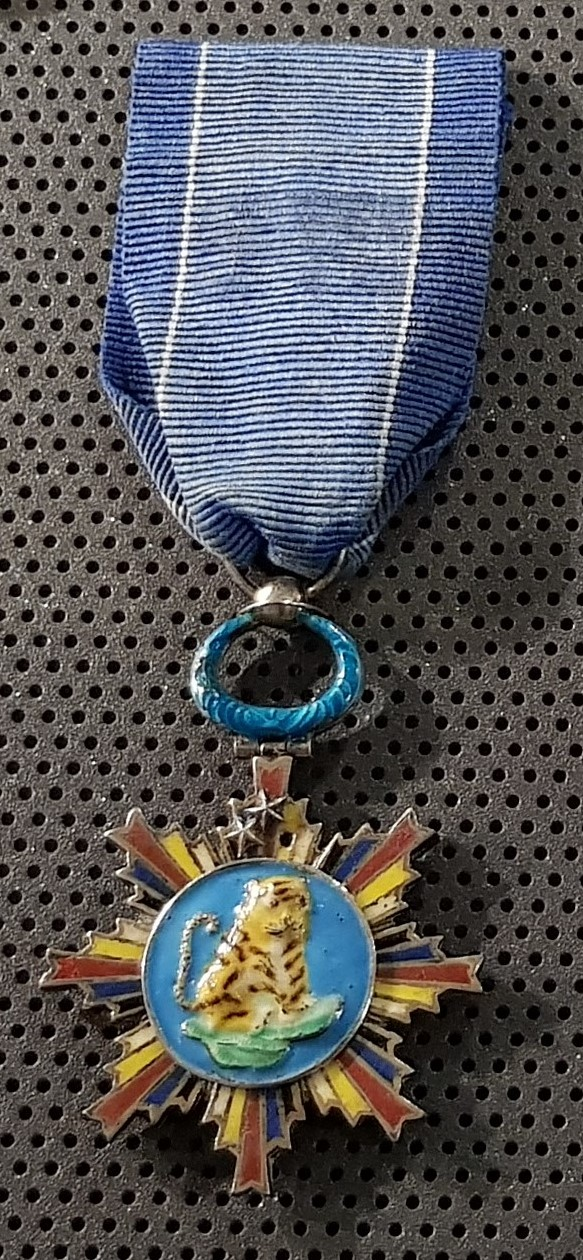
- Country: Republic of China
- Presented by: Republic of China
- Eligibility: Military personnel
- Status: Inactive
- Ribbon of the Order (2nd Class)

The Order of Wen-Hu (Chinese: 文虎勳章, English – The Order of the Striped Tiger) was an award for military or naval service awarded by the Republic of China. It was issued in five classes. The badge showed a striped tiger in natural colours on a central medallion. During World War I, a large number of Chinese served with both the Chinese Labour Corps and the Royal Army Medical Corps, and many British officers, particularly in those two corps, received the order. The majority were issued in February 1920.

== Notable recipients ==
- Premier of Republic of China Yan Xishan
- British Major R. V. C. Bodley
- British Admiral of the Fleet Sir Osmond de Beauvoir Brock
- U.S. Navy Officer Walter S. Crosley
- British Colonel Bryan Fairfax
- Japanese General Fukushima Yasumasa
- Lieutenant General Sir Humfrey Myddelton Gale
- U.S. Admiral Albert Gleaves
- British Brigadier General Frederick Kisch
- Japanese Navy Officer Kobayashi Seizō
- British Field Marshal Frederick Rudolph Lambart, 10th Earl of Cavan
- British Admiral of the Fleet Sir Charles Madden, 1st Baronet
- Japanese Army Minister Shirakawa Yoshinori
- British Missionary William Edward Soothill
- British Admiral of the Fleet Sir Frederick Charles Doveton Sturdee, 1st Baronet
- Japanese General Tanaka Giichi
- Japanese Governor-General of Korea Terauchi Masatake
- British Vice Admiral Norman Wodehouse
- Marshal Zhang Zuolin, dujun of Manchuria
