= Shi Jianqiao =

20th-century Chinese assassin

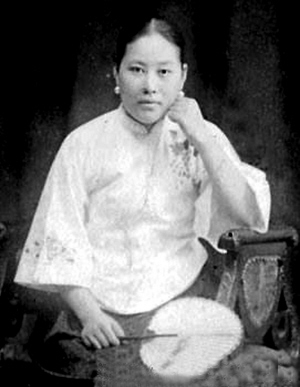
- Undated photo of Shi Jianqiao as a young woman
- Born: Shi Gulan; 1905 or 1906; Shazigang village, Tongcheng City, Anhui Province, Qing Empire
- Died: 27 August 1979 (aged 73–74)
- Known for: assassination of the warlord Sun Chuanfang

Shi Jianqiao
- Traditional Chinese: 施劍翹
- Simplified Chinese: 施剑翘
Transcriptions
Standard Mandarin
- Hanyu Pinyin: Shī Jiànqiào
- Wade–Giles: Shih^{1} Chien^{4}-chʻiao^{4}
- IPA: [ʂɻ̩́ tɕjɛ̂n.tɕʰjâʊ]

Shi Jianqiao (Chinese: 施劍翹, 1905 or 1906 – 27 August 1979) was the daughter of the Chinese military officer Shi Congbin, whose killing she avenged by assassinating the former warlord Sun Chuanfang. The revenge killing and the legal proceedings that followed were highly publicized at the time and incited public debates over the concepts of filial piety and the rule of law.

== Names ==
Shi Jianqiao's given name was Shi Gulan, (simplified Chinese: 施谷兰; traditional Chinese: 施谷蘭; pinyin: Shī Gǔlán; Wade–Giles: Shih Ku-lan; lit. 'Valley Orchid'). She adopted the name Shi Jianqiao around the time she was planning to assassinate Sun Chuanfang to avenge her father's killing. The characters of her adopted name mean "sword" and "to raise" alluding to her planned role as an avenging assassin.

== Background ==
Shi Jianqiao was born in Tongcheng City, Anhui Province, in the small village of Shazigang. While her grandfather had still been a farmer and tofu seller, her father and one of her uncles rose to become decorated soldiers, which led to an increase in the family's social status. She grew up in Jinan, Shandong Province and had her feet bound as a young girl. By the year he was killed (1925), her father had been promoted to director of military affairs in Shandong Province and served as brigade commander under the local warlord Zhang Zongchang. Zhang Zongchang and hence Shi Congbin were aligned with the Fengtian clique, one of the two main competing warlord factions at the time. By some accounts, Shi Jianqiao graduated from Tianjin Normal College (天津師範學校; Tiānjīn Shīfàn Xuéxiào).

In October 1925, during the second war between the Zhili and Fengtian warlord cliques, her father Shi Congbin was leading a brigade of mercenary soldiers in an attempt to capture Guzhen, Shandong. However, he found himself surrounded by troops of the Zhili warlord Sun Chuanfang who had been leading a surprise counterattack against the advance of the Fengtian troops. The next day, Sun had Shi decapitated and his severed head displayed in public at the train station of Bengbu, Anhui. Less than two years later, in early 1927, Sun Chuanfeng was deposed by the Northern Expedition, a military campaign by the Kuomintang that was targeted at ending the rule of the local warlords. He retired from his military career and founded the Tianjin Qingxiu lay-Buddhist society (天津佛教居士林; Tiānjīn Fójiào Jūshìlín) together with his former fellow warlord Jin Yunpeng.

== Revenge ==
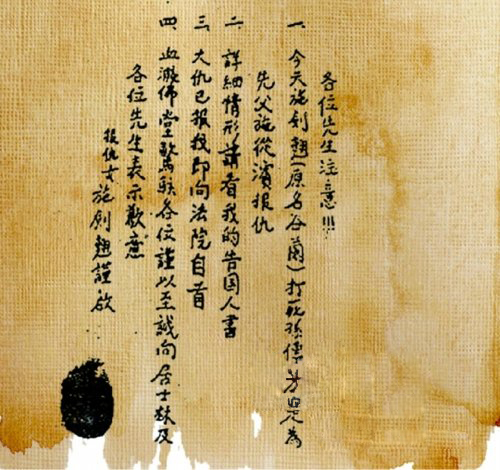
Pamphlet by Shi Jianqiao authenticated with her fingerprint

About 10 years after the death of her father, Shi Jianqiao tracked down Sun Chuanfang in Tianjin. Shortly after 3 pm on 13 November 1935, she approached him from behind while he was leading a sutra-recitation session at his lay-Buddhist society on Nanma Road. She then killed the kneeling former warlord by shooting him three times with her Browning pistol. After the assassination, she stayed at the crime scene to explain her deed and distribute mimeographed pamphlets to bystanders. Her case drew a significant amount of public and media attention. After a lengthy legal process with two appeals that ultimately reached the Supreme Court in Nanjing and pitted public sentiment against the rule of law, she was finally given a state pardon by the Nationalist government on 14 October 1936. The assassination of Sun Chuanfang was ethically justified as an act of filial piety and turned into a political symbol of the legitimate vengeance against the Japanese invaders.

== Later life and death ==
In 1949, Shi Jianqiao was elected as vice-chair of the Women's Federation of Suzhou. In 1957, she was appointed to the Beijing Municipal Committee of the Chinese People's Political Consultative Conference.

Shi Jianqiao died in 1979, shortly after surgery for advanced colorectal cancer. Her ashes were buried in the West Tianling Cemetery (西天灵公墓; Xī Tiānlíng Gōngmù) in Suzhou.
