= Love in a City of Chaos =

Collection of poems by Chang Wo-chun

Love in a City of Chaos (亂都之戀) is a collection of new poems written by Chang Wo-chun, a Taiwanese writer during the Japanese ruling period. It was published in December 1925 and is the first Chinese-language poetry collection published in Taiwan. The book was out of print in Taiwan for a long time, but was rediscovered by the historian Huang Tien-heng in 1986 and reprinted by the Liaoning University Press in China in 1987.

== Plot ==
The cover of the book is marked as a "lyric poetry collection". The so-called "City of Chaos" refers to Peking (now Beijing), China, in the 1920s, when the Fengtian and Zhili warlords were at war and the people in and around Beijing were in a state of panic. The poems in this collection express Chang Wo-chun's emotional journey during this period of his love life. Because the girl's parents opposed their relationship at the time, the two of them eventually eloped to Taiwan. Therefore, this work also reflects their spirit of pursuing marital autonomy at the time.

== Reception ==
Love in a City of Chaos is generally believed to be based on Chang Wo-chun's own love experience, breaking through the traditional constraints of society at that time. Based on the unique themes and genres, Love in a City of Chaos has been included in some literary critics' works of criticism on Taiwanese literary history. Chen Fang-ming in A History of Modern Taiwanese Literature affirms that it is "a landmark event, because it is the first book of vernacular Chinese poetry in a colonial society (referring to Taiwan, Penghu, and other Japanese colonies), and it also shows Chang Wo-chun's determination to practice his own literary theories with concrete works."
