= Warlord Era =

Period of Chinese history (1916–1928)

- 6 June 1916 – 29 December 1928
National Protection War	Nanjing Decade
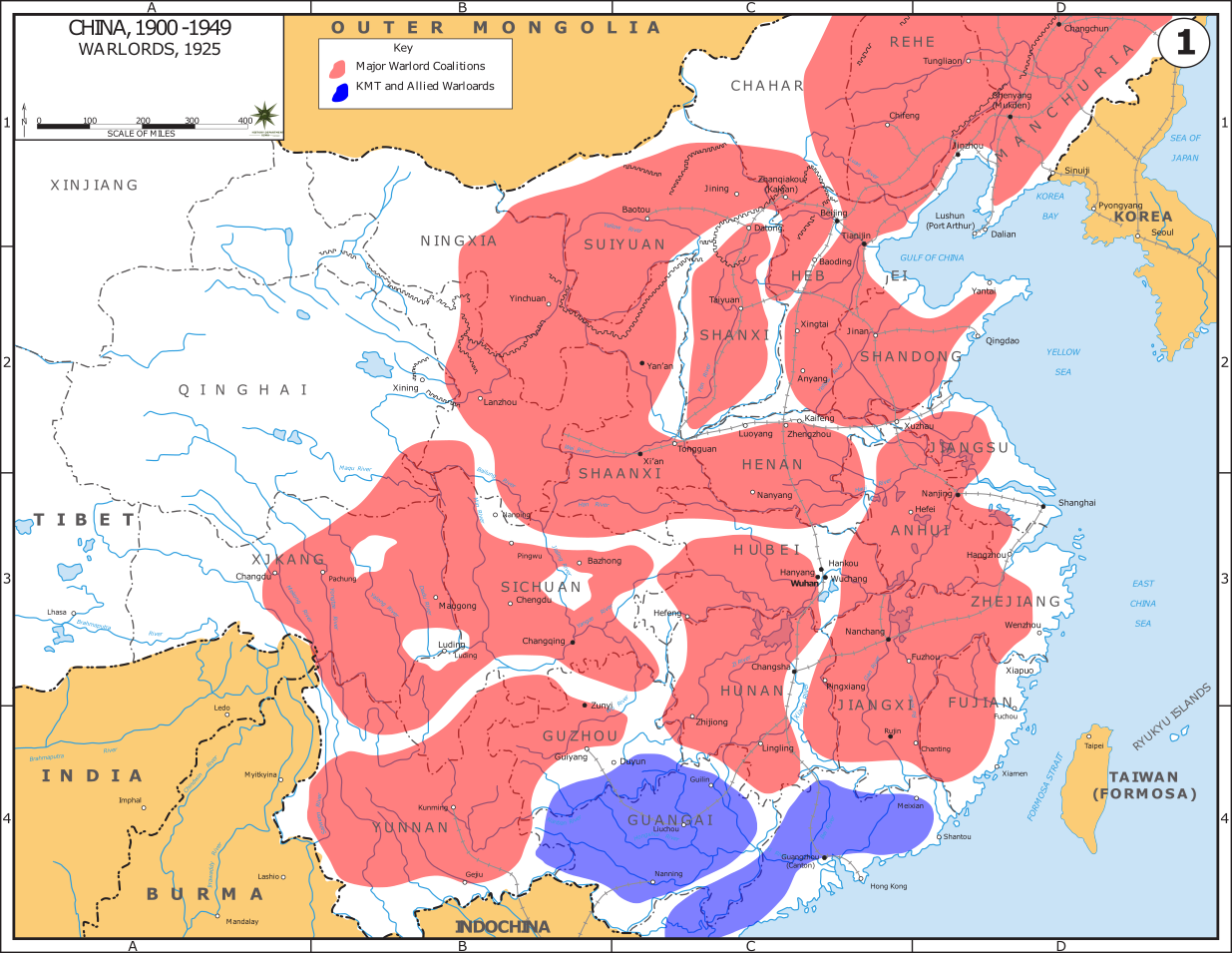
- Major Chinese warlord coalitions in 1925. The blue area was controlled by the Kuomintang, which later formed the Nationalist government in Guangzhou.
- Duration: 12 years, 6 months, 3 weeks and 2 days
- Location: Republic of China
- Key events: Constitutional Protection Movement; May Fourth Movement; Northern Expedition

Warlord Era
- Traditional Chinese: 軍閥時代
- Simplified Chinese: 军阀时代
Transcriptions
Standard Mandarin
- Hanyu Pinyin: Jūnfá shídài
- Bopomofo: ㄐㄩㄣ ㄈㄚˊ ㄕˊ ㄉㄞˋ
- Wade–Giles: Chün^{1}-fa^{2} shih^{2}-tai^{4}
- Tongyong Pinyin: Jyun-fá shíh-dài
- IPA: [tɕýn.fǎ ʂɻ̩̌.tâɪ]
Yue: Cantonese
- Jyutping: Gwan1 fat6 si4 doi6
- IPA: [kʷɐn˥ fɐt̚˨ si˩ tɔj˨]
Southern Min
- Hokkien POJ: Kun-hoa̍t sî-tāi

The Warlord Era was the period in the history of the Republic of China between 1916 and 1928, when control of the country was divided between rival military cliques of the Beiyang Army and other regional factions. It began after the death of Yuan Shikai, the President of China after the Xinhai Revolution. He took power by leveraging his position as Prime Minister of the Qing Dynasty to force the Emperor’s abdication in exchange for the presidency. He quickly abandoned his promises of reform, working to dismantle the parliament and consolidate military power. As a result, following Yuan's death on 6 June 1916, a power vacuum occurred which was quickly filled by military strongmen, leading to widespread violence, chaos, and oppression. The Nationalist Kuomintang (KMT) government of Sun Yat-sen, based in Guangzhou, began contesting Yuan's Beiyang government based in Beijing for recognition as the legitimate government of China.

The most powerful cliques were the Zhili clique led by Feng Guozhang, who controlled several northern provinces; the Anhui clique led by Duan Qirui, based in several southeastern provinces; and the Fengtian clique led by Zhang Zuolin, based in Manchuria. The three cliques often engaged in conflict for territory and hegemony. In mid-1917, after Yuan's successor Li Yuanhong attempted to remove Duan as premier, the general Zhang Xun forced Li to resign and made a brief attempt to restore the Qing dynasty, which was quashed by Duan's troops. Feng became the acting president, but was forced to step down by Duan in late 1918 and was replaced by Xu Shichang. In mid-1920, the new Zhili clique leaders, Cao Kun and Wu Peifu, defeated Duan in the Zhili–Anhui War in an alliance with Zhang Zuolin. A power struggle broke out between Cao and Zhang, ending in Cao's victory in the First Zhili–Fengtian War in 1922. Li was briefly restored to an impotent presidency before being deposed by and in favour of Cao until 1924, when during the Second Zhili–Fengtian War, the latter was betrayed by his subordinate Feng Yuxiang, who joined with Zhang to stage a coup against Cao. Feng and Zhang shared power and recalled Duan to serve as president before they clashed in the Anti-Fengtian War that resulted in Zhang's victory. Duan was deposed and, after a series of short-lived cabinets, Zhang declared himself Generalissimo in 1927.

The warlords of southern China, who had cooperated against Yuan's dictatorship and Duan's attempt to extend Beiyang control to the south, were divided between Sichuan, Yunnan, Hunan, and Guangxi cliques, among others. In 1917, Sun Yat-sen created the Constitutional Protection Junta in Guangzhou to oppose the Beiyang warlords, but the southern warlords rivaled him for control, leading Sun to abandon it in 1918. In 1920, Chen Jiongming invaded Guangdong in the Guangdong–Guangxi War and gained control, after which Sun returned to Guangzhou. In 1922, Chen and Sun broke over political disagreements, after which the Yunnan and Guangxi warlords helped Sun regain power in 1923. To resolve the problem of being dependent on warlords, Sun accepted Soviet assistance in building a party and military infrastructure of his own, creating the Whampoa Military Academy and the National Revolutionary Army (NRA). After Sun died in 1925, the head of the Whampoa Academy, Chiang Kai-shek, emerged as leader of the NRA and KMT. In 1926, he launched the Northern Expedition, which destroyed the Zhili and Anhui forces. Zhang Zuolin was assassinated by the Japanese in 1928, and on 29 December, his son Zhang Xueliang accepted the leadership of Chiang's Nationalist government, thus reunifying China and beginning the Nanjing decade.

Despite most accounts of the era concluding it with the Northern Expedition of 1928, several warlords retained their influence during the 1930s and 1940s, resulting in events such as the Central Plains War of 1929–1930, in which the former warlords Feng Yuxiang, Yan Xishan of Shanxi, and Li Zongren of Guangxi rebelled against Chiang. Regional control by former warlords was problematic for the Nanjing government during the Second Sino-Japanese War and Chinese Civil War, and contributed to the Communists' final victory in 1949. Other major warlords included the Ma clique in Gansu, Ningxia, and Qinghai; Liu Xiang and Liu Wenhui in Sichuan; Long Yun in Yunnan; Zhang Jingyao in Hunan; Zhang Zongchang and Han Fuju in Shandong; and Sheng Shicai in Xinjiang.

== Terminology ==
On December 28 1918, Chen Duxiu introduced the term Junfa (軍閥) in an article for the Meizhou Pinglun (每週評論, lit. 'Weekly Review') taken from the Japanese language word gunbatsu. It was not widely used until the 1920s, when it was taken up by left-wing groups to excoriate local militarists. Previously, these militarist leaders were known as a Dujun (督軍), or provincial military governor, owing to the system Yuan Shikai introduced after he centralized power. The English transliteration of the term tuchun could be found in contemporaneous sources by 1917.

== Origins ==
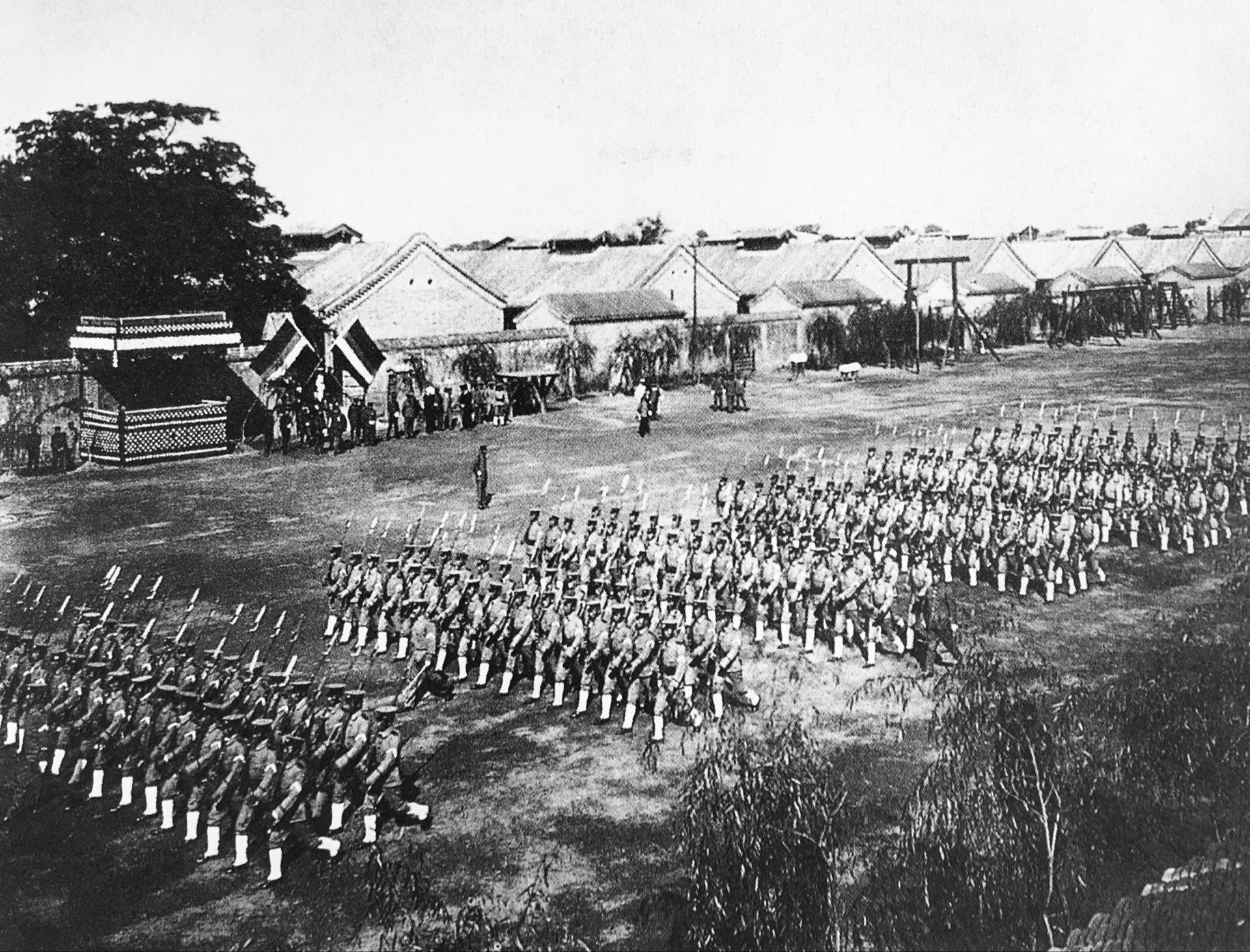
The Beiyang Army in training

The origins of the armies and leaders that dominated politics after 1912 lay in the military reforms of the late Qing dynasty. During the Taiping Rebellion (1850–1864), the Qing dynasty was forced to allow provincial governors to raise their own armies, the Yong Ying, to fight against the Taiping rebels; many of these provincial forces were not disbanded after the Taiping rebellion was over, like Li Hongzhang's Huai Army.

=== Taiping rebellion ===
Strong bonds, family ties, and respectful treatment of troops were emphasized. The officers were never rotated, and the soldiers were hand-picked by their commanders, and commanders by their generals, so personal bonds of loyalty formed between local officers and the troops, unlike Green Standard and Banner forces. The late Qing reforms did not establish a national army; instead, they mobilized regional armies and militias that had neither standardization nor consistency. Officers were loyal to their immediate superiors and formed cliques based on their place of origin and background. Units were composed of men from the same province. This policy was meant to reduce dialectal miscommunication, but had the side effect of encouraging regionalist tendencies.

Although the post–Taiping Rebellion governors are generally not recognized as the direct predecessors of the warlords, their combined military-civil authority and somewhat greater powers as compared to earlier governors provided a model for Republic-era provincial leaders. The fragmentation of military power due to the late Qing's lack of a unified military force, exacerbated by the rise of provincialism during the revolution, was also a strong factor behind the proliferation of warlords. Apart from administrative and financial obstacles, the late Qing government seemed to have relied on this divided military structure to maintain political control.

The rising necessity of military professionalism, with scholars becoming heavily militarized, led to many officers from non-scholarly backgrounds rising to high command and even high office in civil bureaucracy. At this time, the military upstaged the civil service. The influence of German and Japanese ideas of military predominance over the nation, coupled with the absence of national unity amongst the various cliques in the officer class, led to the fragmentation of power.

=== Xinhai revolution ===
The most powerful regional army was the northern-based Beiyang Army under Yuan Shikai, which received the best in training and modern weaponry. The Xinhai Revolution in 1911 brought widespread mutiny across southern China. The revolution began with the Wuchang Uprising in October 1911, where soldiers began to mutiny and defect to the political opposition. These revolutionary forces established a provisional government in Nanjing the following year under Sun Yat-sen, who had returned from his long exile to lead the revolution. It became clear that the revolutionaries were not strong enough to defeat the Beiyang army, and continued fighting would almost certainly lead to defeat. Instead, Sun negotiated with Beiyang commander Yuan Shikai to bring an end to the Qing and reunify China. In return, Sun would hand over his presidency and recommend Yuan to be the president of the new republic. Yuan refused to move to Nanjing and insisted on maintaining the capital in Beijing, where his power base was secure.

=== Yuan Shikai's control ===
Reacting to Yuan's growing authoritarianism, the southern provinces rebelled in 1913 but were effectively crushed by Beiyang forces. Civil governors were replaced by military ones. In December 1915, Yuan stated his intention to become emperor of China at the head of a new dynasty. The southern provinces rebelled again in the National Protection War; but this time the situation was far more serious because most Beiyang commanders refused to recognize the monarchy. Yuan renounced his plans for restoring the monarchy to woo back his lieutenants; however, by the time of his death in June 1916, China had fractured politically. The North-South split would persist throughout the entire Warlord Era.

Yuan Shikai cut back on many government institutions at the beginning of 1914 by suspending parliament, followed by the provincial assemblies. His cabinet soon resigned, effectively making Yuan dictator of China. After Yuan Shikai curtailed many basic freedoms, the country quickly spiraled into chaos and entered a period of warlordism. "Warlordism did not substitute military force for the other elements of government; it merely balanced them differently. This shift in balance came partly from the disintegration of the sanctions and values of China's traditional civil government." During this period, there was a general shift from a state-dominated civil bureaucracy held by a central authority to a military-dominated culture held by many groups, with power shifting from warlord to warlord. A theme identified by C. Martin Wilbur was "that a great majority of regional militarists were 'static', that is to say that their principal aim was to secure and maintain control of a particular tract of territory."

== Warlord relations ==
Warlords, in the words of American political scientist Lucian Pye, were "instinctively suspicious, quick to suspect that their interests might be threatened, hard-headed, devoted to the short run and impervious to idealistic abstractions". Warlords usually came from strict military background, and were brutal in their treatment toward both their soldiers and the general population. In 1921, the North China Daily News reported that in Shaanxi, robbery and violent crimes were prevalent and frightened the farmers. Wu Peifu of the Zhili clique was known for suppressing strikes by railroad workers by terrorizing them with execution. A British diplomat in Sichuan witnessed two mutineers being publicly hacked to death with their hearts and livers hung out; another two being publicly burned to death; while others had slits cut into their bodies into which were inserted burning candles before they were hacked to pieces.

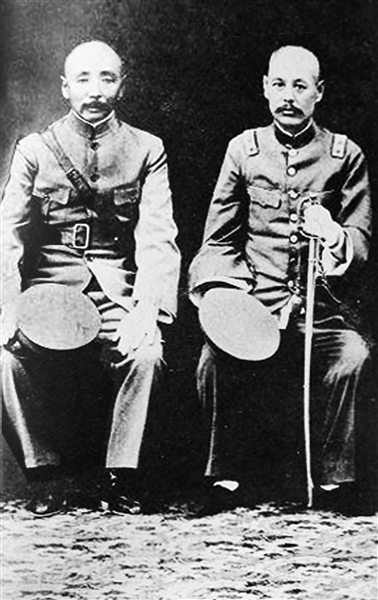
Zhang Zuolin (left) and Wu Peifu (right), two of the most powerful strongmen of the era

Warlords placed great stress on personal loyalty, yet subordinate officers often betrayed their commanders in exchange for bribes known as "silver bullets", and warlords often betrayed allies. Promotion had little to do with competence, and instead, warlords attempted to create an interlocking network of familial, institutional, regional, and master-pupil relationships together with membership in sworn brotherhoods and secret societies. Subordinates who betrayed their commanders could suffer harshly. In November 1925, Guo Songling, the leading general loyal to Marshal Zhang Zuolin—the "Old Marshal" of Manchuria—made a deal with Feng Yuxiang to revolt, which nearly toppled the "Old Marshal", who had to promise his rebel soldiers a pay increase; that, together with signs that the Japanese still supported Zhang, caused them to go back on their loyalty to him. Guo and his wife were both publicly shot and their bodies left to hang for three days in a marketplace in Mukden. After Feng betrayed his ally Wu to seize Beijing for himself, Wu complained that China was "a country without a system; anarchy and treason prevail everywhere. Betraying one's leader has become as natural as eating one's breakfast".

"Alignment politics" prevented any one warlord from dominating the system. When one warlord started to become too powerful, the rest would ally to stop him, then turn on each other. The level of violence in the first years was restrained, as no leader wanted to engage in too much serious fighting. War brought the risk of damage to one's own forces. For example, when Wu Peifu defeated the army of Zhang Zuolin, he provided two trains to take his defeated enemies home, knowing that if in the future Zhang were to defeat him, he could count on the same courtesy. Furthermore, warlords did not have the economic or logistical capabilities required to achieve decisive victories, and were generally concerned instead with taking over smaller pieces of territory. The violence increased in intensity as the 1920s went on, with the object being to damage the enemy and improve one's bargaining power within the "alignment politics".

== Infrastructure ==
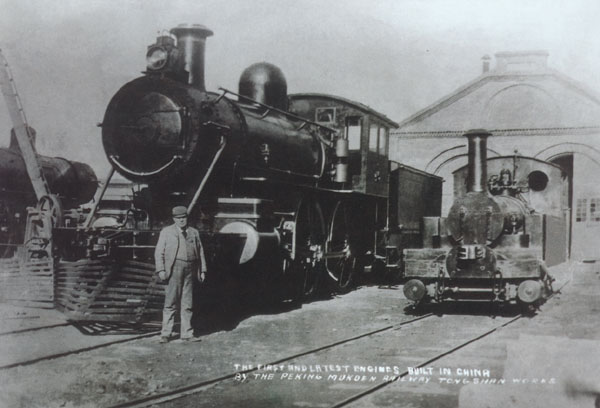
Control of railroads was of great importance to warlords.

As the infrastructure in China was very poor, control of the railway lines and rolling stock was crucial in maintaining a sphere of influence. Railroads were the fastest and cheapest way of moving large numbers of troops, and most battles during this era were fought within a short distance of railways. Armoured trains, full of machine guns and artillery, offered fire support for troops going into battle. In 1925–1927, the largest detachment of armored trains, numbering 7 units, was in the service of Marshal Zhang Zongchang. The armored trains were built according to the World War I model by Russian designers who arrived from Harbin to Jinan, where they had railway workshops. The constant fighting around the railroads caused much economic harm. In 1925, at least 50% of the locomotives being used on the line connecting Nanjing and Shanghai had been destroyed, with the soldiers of one warlord using 300 freight cars as sleeping quarters, all inconveniently parked directly on the rail line. To hinder pursuit, defeated troops tore up the railroads as they retreated; in 1924, damages amounted to 100 million Mexican silver dollars (the main currency used in China at the time). Between 1925 and 1927, fighting in eastern and southern China caused non-military railroad traffic to decline by 25%, raising the prices of goods and causing inventory to build up at warehouses.

China's disunity during this period resulted in varied political experiments in different regions. Some regions experimented with aspects of democracy, including different mechanisms for the election of city and provincial councils. In Hunan, for example, a constitution and universal suffrage were established, and several levels of council were elected by popular vote. These experiments with partial democracy were not long-lasting.

== Warlord profiles ==
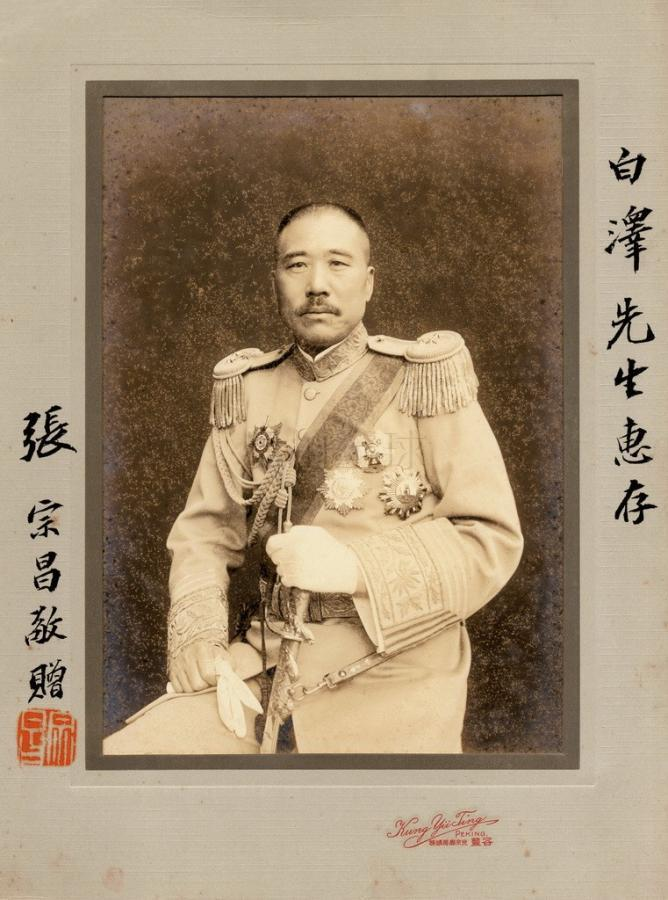
Zhang Zongchang, one of the most infamous Chinese warlords

A few of the warlords had any sort of ideology. Yan Xishan, the "Model Governor" of Shanxi, professed a syncretic creed that merged elements of democracy, militarism, individualism, capitalism, socialism, communism, imperialism, universalism, anarchism, and Confucian paternalism into one. A friend described Yan as "a dark-skinned, mustached man of medium height who rarely laughed and maintained an attitude of great reserve; Yan never showed his inner feelings." He kept Shanxi on a different railroad gauge from the rest of China to make it difficult to invade his province, though that tactic also hindered the export of coal and iron, the main source of Shanxi's wealth. Feng Yuxiang, the "Christian General", promoted Methodism together with a vague sort of left-leaning Chinese nationalism, which led the Soviets to support him for a time. He banned alcohol, lived simply, and wore the common uniform of an infantryman to show his concern for his men. Feng Yuxiang was a soldier since childhood and, like Wu, was a graduate of Paoting. He was baptized by a YMCA leader in 1913; he was known as the "Christian General" as he encouraged his troops to pursue Christianity. He seized Beijing in 1924 and demonstrated how easily a major Chinese city could be overthrown.

Wu Peifu, the "Philosopher General", was a mandarin who passed the Imperial Civil Service exam, billing himself as the protector of Confucian values, usually appearing in photographs with the scholar's brush in his hand (the scholar's brush is a symbol of Confucian culture). Doubters noted, however, that the quality of Wu's calligraphy markedly declined when his secretary died. Wu liked to appear in photos taken in his office with a portrait of his hero George Washington in the background to reflect the supposed democratic militarism he was attempting to bring to China. Wu was famous for his capacity to absorb vast quantities of alcohol and still keep drinking. When he sent Feng a bottle of brandy, Feng replied by sending him a bottle of water, a message that Wu failed to take in. An intense Chinese nationalist, Wu Peifu refused to enter the foreign concessions in China, a stance that was to cost him his life when he refused to go to the International Settlement or the French Concession in Shanghai for medical treatment.

More typical was Marshal Zhang Zuolin, "Warlord of Manchuria", a "graduate of the University of the Green Forest" (i.e., a bandit), an illiterate who had a forceful, ambitious personality that allowed him to rise from the leader of a bandit gang, be hired by the Japanese to attack the Russians during the Russo-Japanese War of 1904–05 and become the warlord of Manchuria by 1916. He worked openly for the Japanese in ruling Manchuria. Zhang controlled only 3% of China's population but 90% of its heavy industry. The wealth of Manchuria, the support of the Japanese, and Zhang's hard-hitting, swift-moving cavalry made him the most powerful of the warlords. His Japanese patrons insisted that he ensure a stable economic climate to facilitate Japanese investment, making him one of the few warlords who sought to pursue economic growth instead of just plundering. Zhang Zuolin became Japan's ally against Russia during the Russo-Japanese War. He had also served as the military governor of Mukden since 1911.

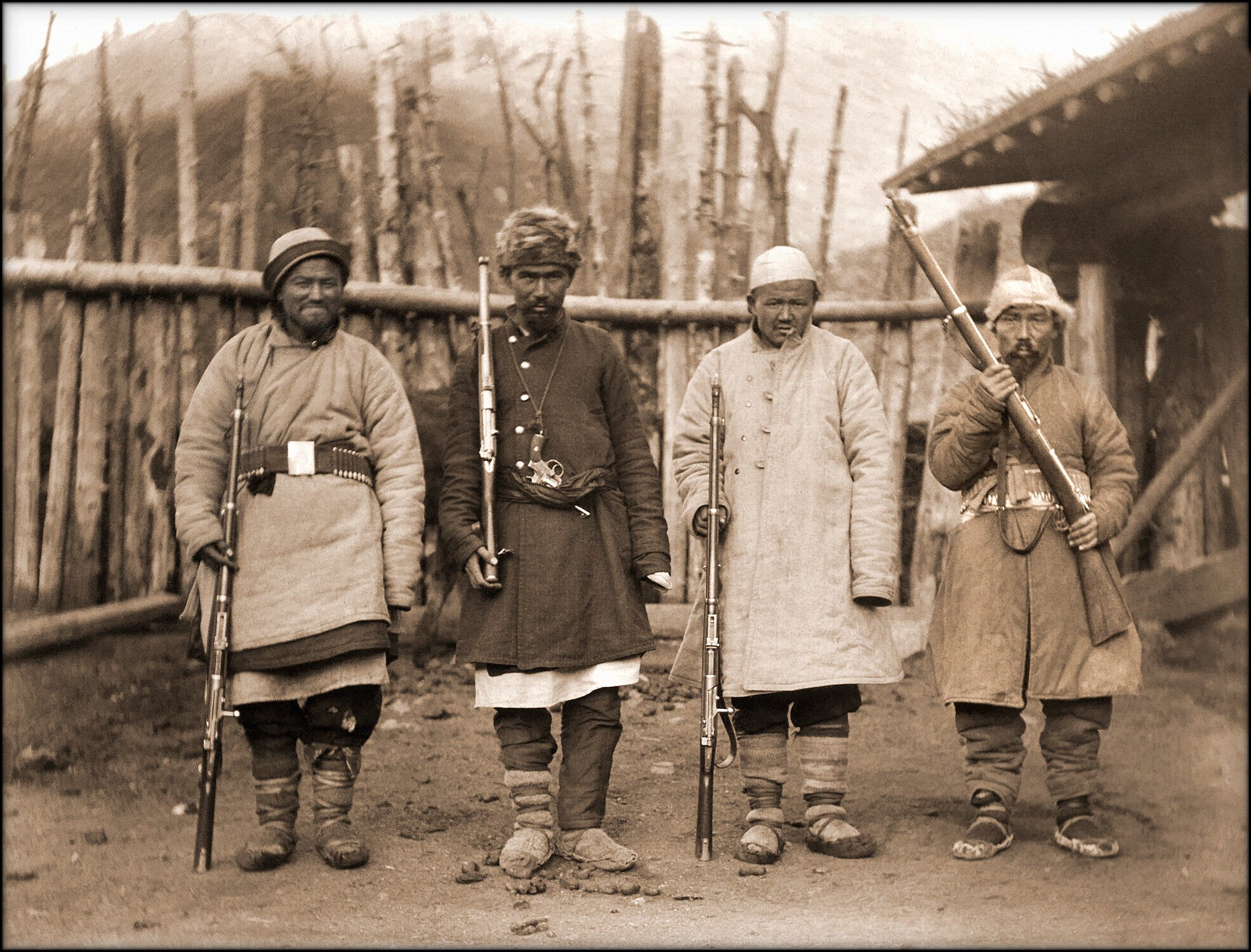
Bandits in northwestern China, around 1915

Zhang Zongchang, known as the "Dogmeat General" because of his love for the gambling game of that name, was described as having "the physique of an elephant, the brain of a pig and the temperament of a tiger". Writer Lin Yutang called Zhang "the most colorful, legendary, medieval, and unashamed ruler of modern China". Former Emperor Puyi remembered Zhang as "a universally detested monster" whose ugly, bloated face was "tinged with the livid hue induced by heavy opium smoking". Zhang's soldiers were notorious for their habit of smashing in the heads of prisoners with their swords, which they called "smashing melons". He loved to boast about the size of his penis, which became part of his legend. He was widely believed to be the most well-endowed man in China, nicknamed "General Eighty-Six" as his penis when erect was said to measure up to a pile of 86 Mexican silver dollars (25.8 cm or 10.16 in). His harem consisted of Chinese, Korean, Japanese, Russian, and two French women. He gave them numbers, as he could not remember their names, and then usually forgot the numbers.

The great ideological flexibility of warlords and politicians during this era can be well exemplified in the activities of Bai Lang, an important bandit leader. Even though he initially fought in support of the Qing dynasty with ultraconservative monarchists as well as warlords, Bai Lang later allied with republicans, declared himself loyal to Sun Yat-sen and formed a "Citizen's Punitive Army" to rid China of all the warlords.

== Warlord armies ==
Good iron does not make nails, good men do not make soldiers.

— Chinese proverb

Many of the common soldiers in warlord armies were also bandits who took up service for a campaign and then reverted to banditry when the campaign was over. One politician remarked that when the warlords went to war with each other, the bandits became soldiers, and when the war ended, the soldiers became bandits. Warlord armies commonly raped or took many women into sexual slavery. The system of looting was institutionalized, as many warlords lacked the money to pay their troops. Some took to kidnapping and might send a hostage's severed fingers along with the ransom demand as a way of encouraging prompt payment.

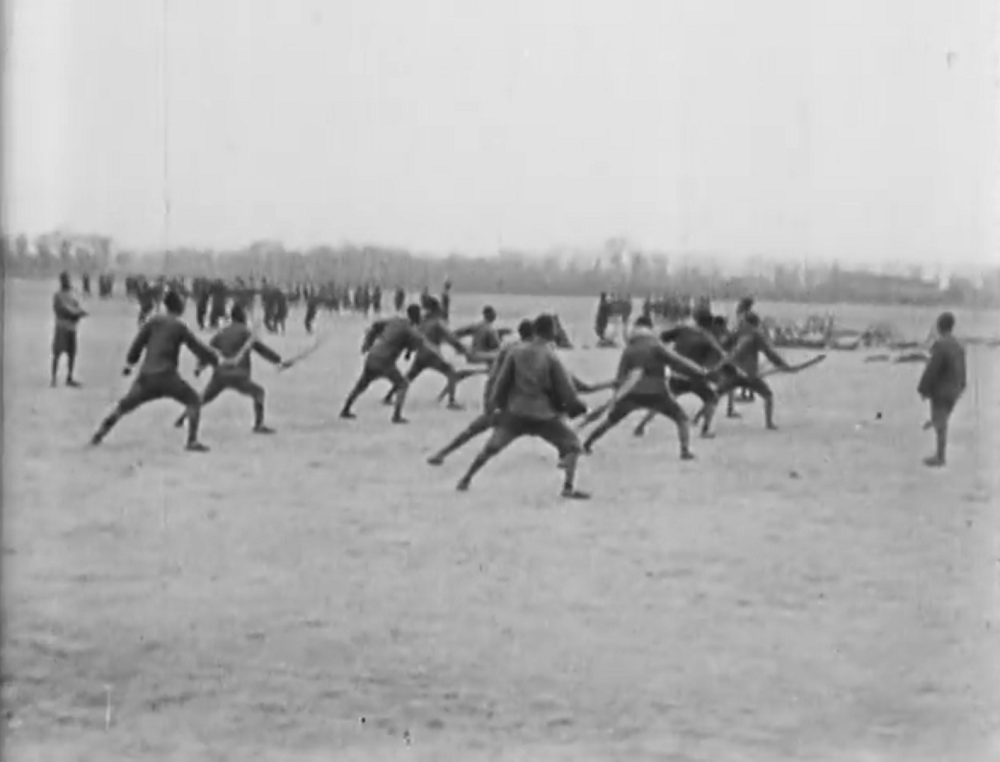
Warlord soldiers train with dao swords sometime in the 1920s. Some warlord armies, especially those in southern China, were badly armed, paid, and supplied, and often lacked necessities, such as guns, ammunition, and food.

Besides bandits, the rank-and-file of the warlord armies tended to be village conscripts. They might take service in one army, get captured, then join the army of their captors before being captured yet again. Warlords usually incorporated their prisoners into their armies; at least 200,000 men who were serving in the army of Gen. Wu were prisoners he had incorporated into his own army. A survey of one warlord garrison in 1924 revealed that 90% of the soldiers were illiterate. In 1926, U.S. Army officer Joseph Stilwell inspected a warlord unit and observed that 20% were less than 4 feet 6 inches (1.37 m) tall, the average age was 14, and most walked barefoot. Stilwell wrote that this "scarecrow company" was worthless as a military unit. A British army visitor commented that, provided they had proper leadership, the men of northern China were "the finest Oriental raw material with a physique second to none, and an iron constitution". However, such units were the exception rather than the rule.

=== Finances ===
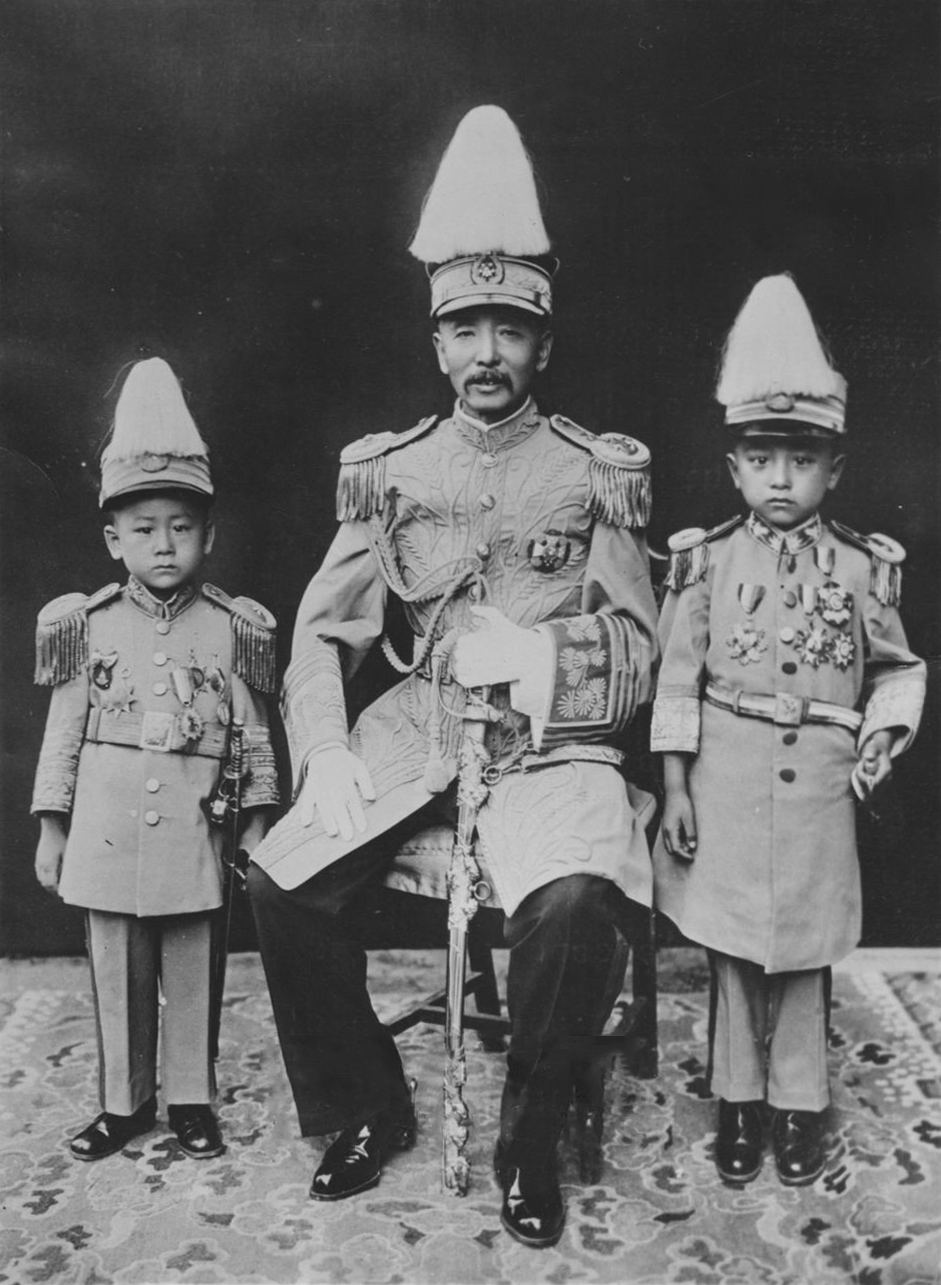
Zhang Zuolin with two of his sons, both wearing expensive miniature uniforms

In 1916, there were about a half-million soldiers in China. By 1922 the numbers had tripled, then tripled again by 1924; more than the warlords could support. For example, Marshal Zhang, the ruler of industrialized Manchuria, took in $23 million in tax revenues in 1925 while spending some $51 million. Warlords in other provinces were even harder-pressed. One way of raising funds were taxes called lijin that were often confiscatory and inflicted much economic harm. For example, in Sichuan province, there were 27 different taxes on salt, and one shipload of paper that was sent down the Yangtze River to Shanghai was taxed 11 different times by various warlords to the sum total of 160% of its value. One warlord imposed a tax of 100% on railroad freight, including food, even though there was a famine in his province. Taxes owed to the central government in Beijing on stamps and salt were usually taken by regional authorities. Despite all of the wealth of Manchuria and the support of the Japanese army, Marshal Zhang had to raise land taxes by 12% between 1922 and 1928 to pay for his wars.

The warlords demanded loans from the banks. The other major revenue source besides taxes, loans, and looting was the selling of opium, with the warlords selling the rights to grow and sell opium within their provinces to consortia of gangsters. Despite his ostensible anti-opium stance, Gen. Feng Yuxiang, "the Christian General", took in some $20 million per annum from opium sales. Inflation was another means of paying for their soldiers. Some warlords simply ran the money-printing presses, and some resorted to duplicating machines to issue new Chinese dollars. The warlord who ruled Hunan province printed 22 million Chinese dollars on a silver reserve worth only one million Chinese dollars in the course of a single year, while Zhang in Shandong province printed 55 million Chinese dollars on a silver reserve of 1.5 million Chinese dollars during the same year. The illiterate Marshal Zhang Zuolin, who engaged in reckless printing of Chinese dollars, did not understand it was him who was causing the inflation in Manchuria, and his remedy was simply to summon the leading merchants of Mukden, accuse them of greed because they were always raising their prices, had five of them selected at random publicly shot and told the rest to behave better.

Despite their constant need for money, the warlords lived in luxury. Marshal Zhang, the "Old Marshal", lived in a lavish palace in Mukden with his five wives, old Confucian texts, and a cellar full of fine French wines, and needed 70 cooks in his kitchen to make enough food for him, his wives, and his guests. Gen. Zhang, the "Dogmeat General", ate his meals off a 40-piece Belgian dinner service, and an American journalist described dinner with him: "He gave a dinner for me where sinful quantities of costly foods were served in a starving country. There was French champagne and sound brandy".

== Armaments ==
=== Domestic production ===
Hanyang Arsenal in Wuhan, Gongxian Arsenal in Gongyi, and the Guangdong Arsenal continued their production of Hanyang 88 and Type 4 rifles throughout the Warlord Era. The Taiyuan Arsenal in Shanxi expanded from a repair and machining facility to an armaments factory in 1923. Producing 1,500 rifles and 500 pistols on a monthly basis for Yan Xishan's army.

The Guangdong and Taiyuan arsenals reverse-engineered the M1921 Thompson submachine gun in 1923 and 1926 respectively. While Shanghai and Jinling Arsenal did the same for the Bergmann MP 18 in 1926.

Copies of Western handguns such as the Mauser C96 and FN M1900 were frequently manufactured. Owing to its production of Thompson submachine guns in .45 ACP, Taiyuan produced the Shanxi Type 17, a C96 copy in the same caliber. While established arsenals produced functional pistols, village workshops manufactured crude copies and bird guns. In 1924, one such workshop in Guangdong paid workers two yuan per gun produced.

=== Foreign imports ===
Large amounts of foreign war materiel were imported into China during the Warlord Era. On May 5 1919, the United Kingdom, United States, Japan, and various other European countries placed an arms embargo on China. In practice, this embargo was ignored by its signatories who aimed to offload surplus weaponry in the aftermath of World War I. Alongside non-signatories such as Norway and Czechoslovakia, they sought to profit from China's internal conflict.

Italy joined the embargo on May 12 1919. From 1921 to 1924, 70,000 Vetterli rifles were sold to Cao Kun and Wu Peifu, with one order's shipment labeled as Japanese toys. One advertisement in the English-language Peking & Tientsin Times promoted an auction in which Italian field guns with shells and 44,000 rifles with 30 million rounds would be auctioned off and "escorted to destinations by the Italian Marines."

=== Aircraft ===
Airplanes had been flown from Nanyuan airfield since at least 1907. The first usage of military aviation by a warlord occurred during the Manchu Restoration. In which Duan Qirui's forces enlisted students from Nanyuan's aviation school to bomb the Forbidden City. The ensuing aerial bombardment damaged buildings, and resulted in the death of one eunuch. In 1919, the Anhui clique would acquire six Handley Page 0/400 aircraft. Following their defeat in the Zhili-Anhui War, these would be divided among the Fengtian and Zhili cliques. On February 27 1924, the Anhui clique reformed their air force. Placing it in the command of flying ace Zhu Binhou. It included at least one Breguet 14. It would participate in the Jiangsu-Zhejiang War later that year, and dissolve following the Anhui clique's defeat.

=== Armor ===
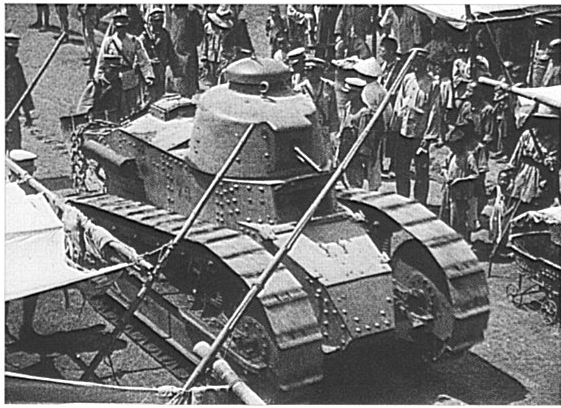
A Renault FT of the Fengtian clique during the Northern Expedition

Zhang Zuolin was the first warlord to utilize tanks. In 1919, Renault FT-17s previously used by French forces of the Allied intervention in the Russian Civil War were acquired by him from Vladivostok. He would augment his armored forces with 36 more FT-17s in both machine gun and turret configurations. In 1928, six FT-17s would be destroyed by Nationalist forces during the Northern Expedition.

=== Usage ===
The level of training varied among warlord armies. Though very few could afford proper weapons training due to the price of guns and ammunition. In 1917, future general Cai Tingkai deserted and sold his rifle for 80 yuan. Nearly a year's pay for a soldier of the time. A British mercenary complained in 1923 that Wu Peifu had about 45 European artillery pieces that were inoperable because they had not been properly maintained.

During the crossing of the Russian-Chinese border in November 1922 and the disarmament, the Chinese authorities of Marshal Zhang Zuolin bought or received for free almost all the weapons of the Russian White Army, which had left Vladivostok. In the border city of Kirin, the Chinese received a large number of rifles, machine guns, cartridges, and grenades; the artillery pieces were sent immediately to the city of Changchun.

== Factions ==
=== Northern factions ===
- Anhui clique
- Zhili clique
- Fengtian clique
- Shanxi clique
- Guominjun
- Ma clique
- Xinjiang clique

=== Southern factions ===
- Kuomintang
- Chinese Communist Party
- Yunnan clique
- Guizhou warlords
- Old Guangxi clique
- New Guangxi clique
- Guangdong warlords
- Sichuan clique (Liu Wenhui until 1932 Liu Xiang post Two-Liu war)
- Hunan warlords

== North ==
This military symbol was based on the Five Races Under One Union flag.

The death of Yuan Shikai split the Beiyang Army into two main factions. The Zhili and Fengtian clique were in alliance with one another, while the Anhui clique formed their own faction. International recognition was based on the presence in Beijing, and every Beiyang clique tried to assert its dominance over the capital to claim legitimacy.

=== Duan Qirui and Anhui dominance (1916–1920) ===
While Li Yuanhong replaced Yuan Shikai as the President after his death, the political power was in the hands of Premier Duan Qirui. The government worked closely with the Zhili clique, led by Vice President Feng Guozhang, to maintain stability in the capital. Continuing military influence over the Beiyang government led to provinces around the country refusing to declare their allegiance. The debate between the President and the Premier on whether or not China should participate in the First World War was followed by political unrest in Beijing. Both Li and Duan asked Beiyang general Zhang Xun, stationed in Anhui, to militarily intervene in Beijing. As Zhang marched into Beijing on 1 July, he quickly dissolved the parliament and proclaimed a Manchu Restoration. The new government quickly fell to Duan after he returned to Beijing with reinforcements from Tianjin. As another government was formed in Beijing, Duan's fundamental disagreements over national issues with the new President Feng Guozhang led to Duan's resignation in 1918. The Zhili clique allied with the Fengtian clique, led by Zhang Zuolin, and defeated Duan in the critical Zhili–Anhui War in July 1920.

=== Cao Kun and Zhili dominance (1920–1924) ===
After the death of Feng Guozhang in 1919, the Zhili clique was led by Cao Kun. The alliance with the Fengtian was only one of convenience and war broke out in 1922 (the First Zhili–Fengtian War), with Zhili driving Fengtian forces back to Manchuria. Next, they wanted to bolster their legitimacy and reunify the country by returning Li Yuanhong to the presidency and restoring the National Assembly. They proposed that Xu Shichang and Sun Yat-sen resign their rival presidencies simultaneously in favour of Li. When Sun issued strict stipulations that the Zhili could not stomach, they caused the defection of KMT Gen. Chen Jiongming by recognizing him as governor of Guangdong. With Sun driven out of Guangzhou, the Zhili clique superficially restored the constitutional government that existed prior to Zhang Xun's coup. Cao bought the presidency in 1923 despite opposition by the KMT, Fengtian, Anhui remnants, some of his lieutenants and the public.

In March 1924, the Zhili clique further improved its position when Zhili clique general Sun Chuanfang's forces defeated two Anhui clique generals in Fujian, gaining control of that province. As a result, Zhejiang and Shanghai were some of the limited areas not under Zhili control. On 3 September 1924, Qi Xieyuan's forces attacked the Anhui forces in Zhejiang and Shanghai, beginning the Jiangsu–Zhejiang War. The war ended on 12 October 1924 with the Zhili clique gaining control of Zhejiang and Shanghai.

In the autumn of 1924, the Zhili appeared to be on the verge of complete victory in the Second Zhili–Fengtian War until Feng Yuxiang betrayed the clique, seized Beijing and imprisoned Cao. Zhili forces were routed from the north but kept the center.

=== Duan Qirui's return to power (1924–1926) ===
Feng Yuxiang's defection resulted in the defeat of Wu Peifu and the Zhili clique and forced them to withdraw to the south. The victorious Zhang Zuolin unpredictably named Duan Qirui as the new Chief Executive of the nation on 24 November 1924. Duan's new government was grudgingly accepted by the Zhili clique because, without an army of his own, Duan was now considered a neutral choice. In addition, instead of "President" Duan was now called the "Chief Executive", implying that the position was temporary and therefore politically weak. Duan called on Sun Yat-sen and the Kuomintang in the south to restart negotiations towards reunification. Sun demanded that the "unequal treaties" with foreign powers be repudiated and that a new national assembly be assembled. Bowing to public pressure, Duan promised a new national assembly in three months; however he could not unilaterally discard the "unequal treaties", since the foreign powers had made official recognition of Duan's regime contingent upon respecting these very treaties. Sun died on 12 March 1925, and the negotiations fell apart.

With his clique's military power in a shambles, Duan's government was hopelessly dependent on Feng Yuxiang and Zhang Zuolin. Knowing that those two did not get along, he secretly tried to play one side against the other. On 18 March 1926, a protest march was held against continued foreign infringement on Chinese sovereignty and a recent incident in Tianjin involving a Japanese warship. Duan dispatched military police to disperse the protesters, and in the resulting melee, 47 protesters were killed, and over 200 were injured, including Li Dazhao, co-founder of the Communist Party. The event came to be known as the 18 March Massacre. The next month, Feng Yuxiang again revolted, this time against the Fengtian clique, and deposed Duan, who was forced to flee to Zhang for protection. Zhang, tired of his double dealings, refused to restore him after re-capturing Beijing. Most of the Anhui clique had already sided with Zhang. Duan Qirui exiled himself to Tianjin and later moved to Shanghai, where he died on 2 November 1936.

=== Guominjun and Zhang Zuolin (1924–1928) ===
During the Second Zhili–Fengtian War, Feng Yuxiang changed his support from Zhili to Fengtian and forced the Beijing Coup, which resulted in Cao Kun being imprisoned. Feng soon broke off from the Zhili clique again and formed Guominjun and allied himself with Duan Qirui. In 1926, Wu Peifu from the Zhili clique launched the Anti-Fengtian War. Zhang Zuolin took advantage of the situation and entered Shanhai Pass from the Northeast and captured Beijing. The Fengtian clique remained in control of the capital until the Northern Expedition led by Chiang Kai-shek's National Revolutionary Army forced Zhang out of power in June 1928.

== South ==
The party emblem of the Kuomintang

The southern provinces of China were notably against the Beiyang government in the north, having resisted the restoration of the monarchy by Yuan Shikai and the subsequent government in Peking after his death. Sun Yat-sen, along with other southern leaders, had formed a government in Guangzhou to resist the rule of the Beiyang warlords, and the Guangzhou government came to be known as part of the Constitutional Protection War.

=== Constitutional Protection junta in Guangzhou (1917–1922) ===
In September, Sun was named generalissimo of the military government with the purpose of protecting the provisional constitution of 1912. The southern warlords assisted his regime solely to legitimize their fiefdoms and challenge Beijing. In a bid for international recognition, they also declared war against the Central Powers but failed to garner any recognition. In July 1918, southern militarists thought Sun was given too much power and forced him to join a governing committee. Continual interference forced Sun into self-imposed exile. While away, he recreated the Chinese Nationalist Party, or Kuomintang. With the help of KMT Gen. Chen Jiongming, committee members Gen. Cen Chunxuan, Adm. Lin Baoyi, and Gen. Lu Rongting were expelled in the 1920 Guangdong–Guangxi War. In May 1921, Sun was elected "extraordinary president" by a rump parliament despite protests by Chen and Tang Shaoyi, who complained of its unconstitutionality. Tang left while Chen plotted with the Zhili clique to overthrow Sun in June 1922 in return for recognition of his governorship over Guangdong.

=== Reorganization of the Guangzhou junta (1923–1925) ===
After Chen was driven out of Guangzhou, Sun returned to assume leadership in March 1923. The party was reorganized along Leninist democratic centralism, and the alliance with the Chinese Communist Party (CCP) came to be known as First United Front. The Guangzhou government focused on training new officers through the newly created Whampoa Military Academy. In 1924, the Zhilii clique fell out of power, and Sun travelled to Beiping to negotiate terms of reunification with leaders from Guominjun, Fengtian, and Anhui clique. He was unable to secure the terms as he died in March 1925 from illness. Power struggles within the KMT ensued after the death of Sun. The Yunnan–Guangxi War broke out as Tang Jiyao tried to claim party leadership. In the north, there were struggles led by Guominjun against the Fengtian-Zhili alliance from November 1925 to April 1926. The defeat of Guominjun ended their reign in Beiping.

=== Nanjing-Wuhan Split (1927) ===
In April 1927, Commander-in-Chief of the NRA (National Revolutionary Army) Chiang Kai-Shek began a purge of leftists and communists in what is known as the Shanghai massacre. The massacre was opposed by the Wuhan Nationalist government. Wang Jingwei, head of the Wuhan government, had insisted on continuing cooperation with the communists. The result was that Chiang would set up a new, separate nationalist government in Nanjing on 18 April 1927.

In the end, Wang relented, purging the CCP members and moving the Wuhan government to Nanjing, and reuniting the KMT back into one government. This would be known as the Nanjing-Wuhan Reconciliation and marked the end of the first KMT-CCP alliance.

== Other forces ==
=== Local militias ===
To defend themselves from the attacks of the warlord factions and armies, peasants organized themselves into militant secret societies and village associations, which served as self-defense militias as well as vigilante groups. As the peasants usually had neither money for guns nor military training, these secret societies relied on martial arts, self-made weapons such as swords and spears, as well as the staunch belief in protective magic. The latter was especially important, as the conviction of invulnerability was "a powerful weapon for bolstering the resolve of people who possessed few alternative resources with which to defend their meager holdings". Magical rituals practiced by the peasants ranged from rather simple ones, such as swallowing charms, to much more elaborate practices. For example, elements of the Red Spear Society performed secret ceremonies to confer invulnerability from bullets to channel the power of Qi and went into battle naked with supposedly bulletproof red clay smeared over their bodies. The Mourning Clothes Society would perform three kowtows and weep loudly before each battle. There were also all-female self-defense groups, such as the Iron Gate Society or the Flower Basket Society. The former would dress entirely in white (the color of death in China) and waved fans that they believed would deflect gunfire, while the latter fought with a sword and a magical basket to catch their opponents' bullets. Disappointed with the state of the republic and warlordism, many peasant secret societies adopted millenarian beliefs and advocated for the restoration of the Ming dynasty. The members of these societies believed that a Ming emperor would bring a "reign of happiness and justice for all".

=== Foreign mercenaries ===
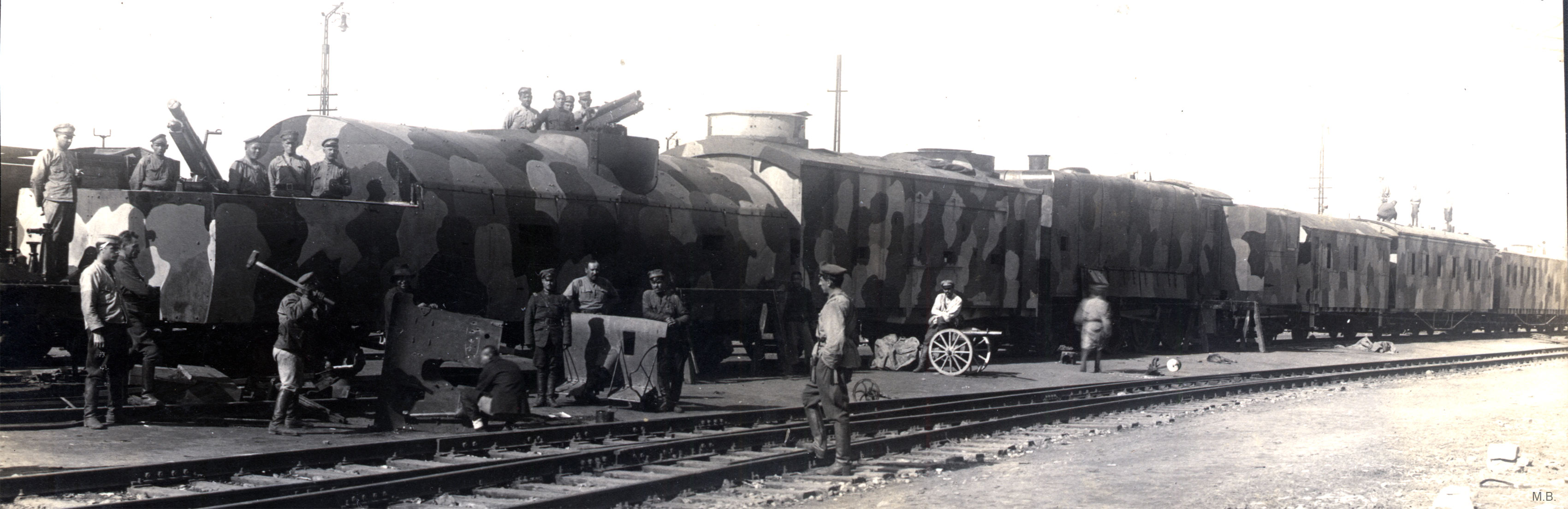
Russian armored train in 1926 in Nechaev's detachment

Following the Russian Civil War, veterans of the White movement emigrated to China and would find employment in Warlord armies. The highest-paid of these units was led by Konstantin Petrovich Nechaev, who fought for the Fengtian Clique. In August 1924, Nechaev's detachment included about 150 Russian mercenaries. At the start of the Second Zhili–Fengtian War 700 Russians would serve under him as part of the Fengtian foreign legion. The legion included 300 Japanese soldiers and two Chinese companies. While the Japanese unit would disband in December 1924, Nechaev's forces would grow to 1,200 by March 1925. During the Northern Expedition, his forces clashed with KMT and CCP forces while defending Shanghai's Zhabei district. Nechaev and his soldiers were demobilized following the defeat of the northern warlords.

Throughout the 1920s Francis Arthur Sutton, a Royal Engineer veteran of the Gallipoli campaign, served as a military advisor to Zhang Zuolin and Wu Peifu. Receiving a salary of £15,000 (equivalent to $784,238 in 2025) as master of Ordnance for the former.

=== Foreign powers ===
During the Warlord Period (as was the case from the late Qing period until the Second Sino-Japanese War), the strongest bureaucratic body in China was the foreign-controlled China Maritime Customs Service. A bureau of the Chinese government, the Customs Service was staffed and controlled by the foreign imperialist powers. By consensus, the foreign powers agreed that they (and the Customs Service) would only recognise the regime which held Beijing at a given time as the government. Through its financial powers, the Customs Service could influence various other warlords.

Foreign consuls regularly met in Shanghai during the Warlord period. The policies enacted by these foreign consuls functionally became the law of China.

== Reunification ==
Chiang Kai-shek emerged as the protégé of Sun Yat-sen following the Zhongshan incident. In the summer of 1926, Chiang and the National Revolutionary Army (NRA) began the Northern Expedition with the hopes of reunifying China. Wu Peifu and Sun Chuanfang of the Zhili clique were subsequently defeated in central and eastern China. In response to the situation, the Guominjun and Yan Xishan of Shanxi formed an alliance with Chiang to attack the Fengtian clique together. In 1927, Chiang initiated a violent purge of Communists in the Kuomintang, which marked the end of the First United Front.

The National Revolutionary Army (NRA), formed by the KMT, swept through southern and central China until it was checked in Shandong, where confrontations with the Japanese garrison escalated into armed conflict. The conflicts were collectively known as the Jinan incident of 1928.

Although Chiang had consolidated the power of the KMT in Nanking, it was still necessary to capture Beiping (Beijing) to claim the legitimacy needed for international recognition. Yan Xishan moved in and captured Beiping on behalf of his new allegiance after the death of Zhang Zuolin in 1928. His successor, Zhang Xueliang, accepted the authority of the KMT leadership, concluding the Northern Expedition.

Map of the campaigns of the Northern expedition of the Kuomintang

== Aftermath ==
The politics of the Nanjing Decade of Kuomintang leadership over China were deeply shaped by the compromises with warlords that had allowed the victory of the Northern expedition. Most provincial leaders were military commanders who joined the party only during the expedition itself, when the warlords and their administrators were absorbed wholesale by Chiang. Although dictatorial, Chiang did not have absolute power as party rivals and local warlords posed a constant challenge.

Despite the reunification, there were still ongoing conflicts across the country. Remaining regional warlords across China chose to cooperate with the Nationalist government, but disagreements with the Nationalist government and regional warlords soon broke out into the Central Plains War in 1930. Northwest China erupted into a series of wars in Xinjiang from 1931 to 1937. Following the Xi'an Incident in 1936, efforts began to shift toward preparation of war against the Japanese Empire.

The warlords continued posing problems for the National Government up until the communist victory in 1949, when many turned on the KMT and defected to the CCP, such as Yunnanese warlord Lu Han, whose troops had earlier been responsible for receiving the surrender of the Japanese in Hanoi and had engaged in widespread looting.

Although Chiang was generally not considered personally corrupt, his power was dependent on balancing between the various warlords. Although he understood and expressed hatred at the fact that KMT corruption was driving the public to the communists, he continued dealing with warlords, tolerating incompetence and corruption while undermining subordinates who became too strong, so as to preserve unity. After the Japanese surrender, warlords turned against the KMT.

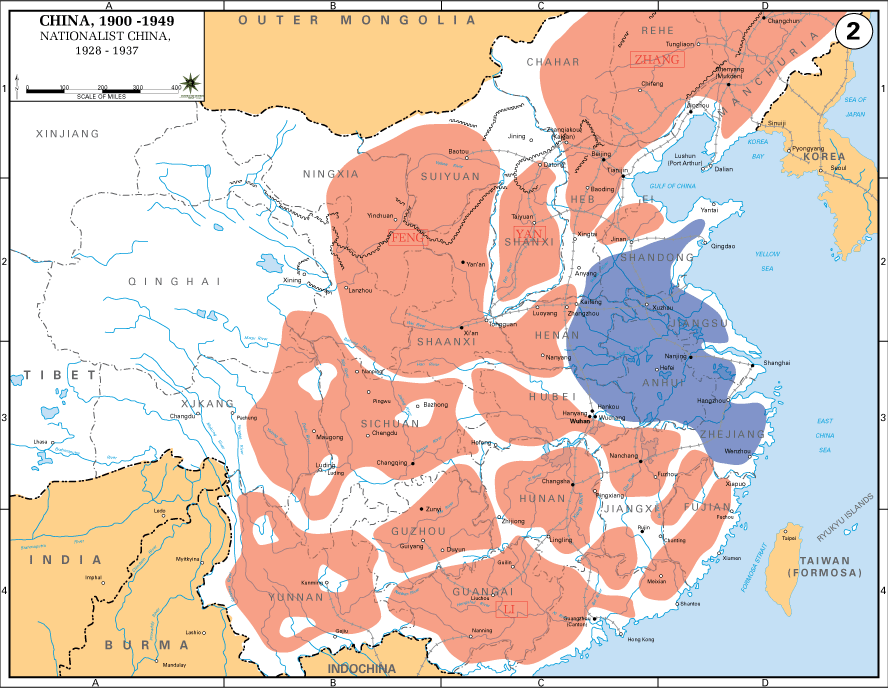
The situation in China in 1929: After the Northern Expedition, the KMT had direct control over east and central China, while the rest of China proper, as well as Manchuria, was under the control of warlords loyal to the Nationalist government.

In the course of the Central Plains War, several warlords attempted to overthrow Chiang Kai-shek's newly formed Nationalist government; despite the defeat of the anti-Kuomintang forces, warlords continued to remain in power in much of China until the 1940s

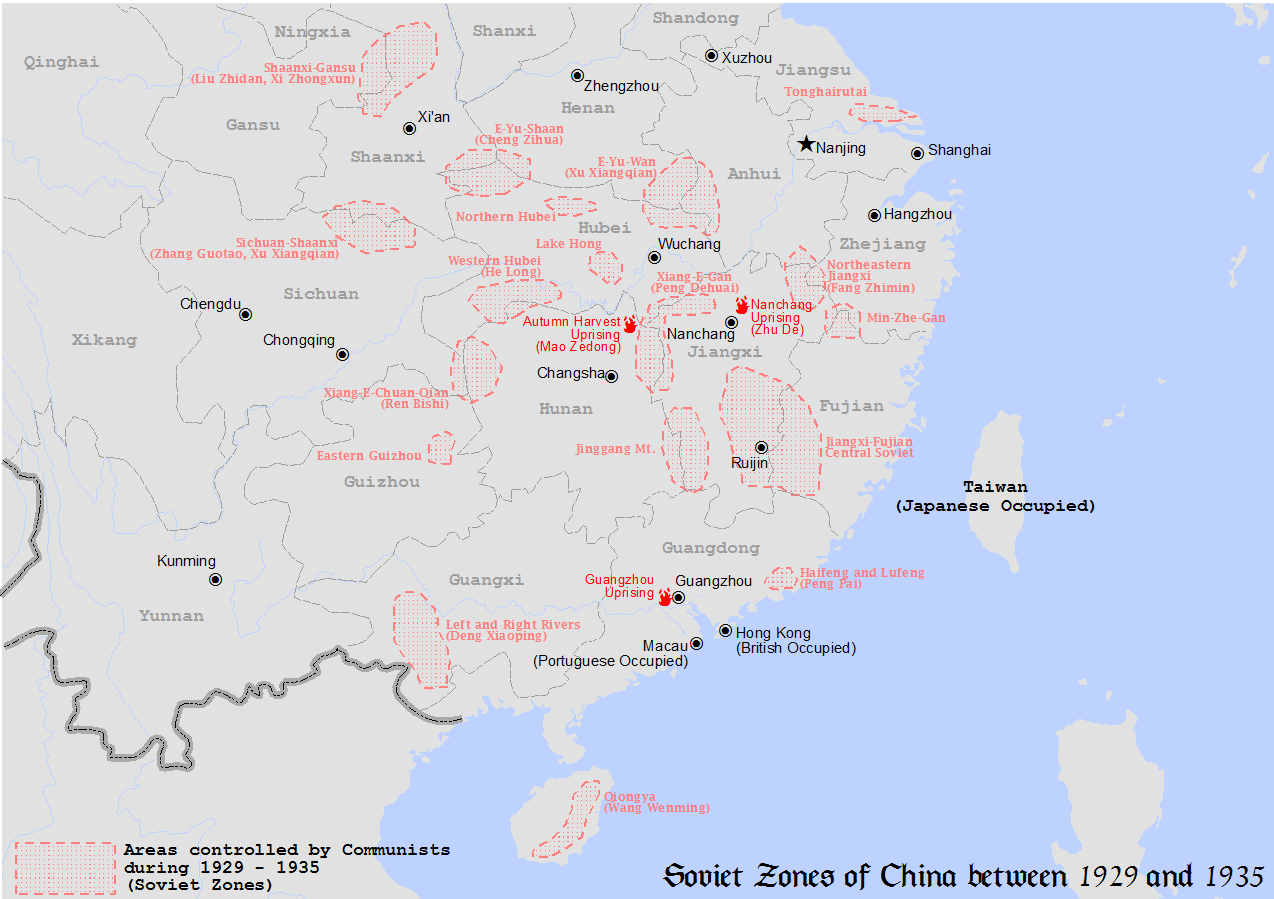
Map showing the communist-controlled Soviet Zones of China during and after the encirclement campaigns. These areas were re-controlled by the Nationalist government after 1934.

== See also ==
- List of aircraft used in China before 1937
- Military of the Republic of China
- Politics of the Republic of China
- Warring States period
