= Lu Yongxiang =

Lu Yongxiang may refer to:

- Lu Yongxiang (warlord) (1867–1933), Chinese warlord of the Anhui clique
- Lu Yongxiang (engineer) (born 1942), Chinese mechanical engineer
