= Second Zhili–Fengtian War =

Conflict between Chinese warlords (1924)

- Part of Warlord era
Date	September 15, 1924 – November 3, 1924
Location	North China
Result	Anti-Zhili alliance victory. Anhui clique leads the Beiyang government

Belligerents
(Republic of China (1912–1949)) Zhili clique	Fengtian clique Anhui clique Guominjun; Army and Navy Marshal stronghold of the Republic of China

Commanders and leaders
Wu Peifu	Zhang Zuolin; Lu Yongxiang; Feng Yuxiang; Sun Yat-sen

Strength
200,000	250,000

Casualties and losses
Thousands plus 40,000+ captured	Tens of thousands

The Second Zhili–Fengtian War (Second Chihli-Fengtien War; simplified Chinese: 第二次直奉战争; traditional Chinese: 第二次直奉戰爭; pinyin: Dì'èrcì Zhífèng Zhànzhēng) of 1924 was a conflict between the Japanese-backed Fengtian clique based in Manchuria, and the more liberal Zhili clique controlling Beijing and backed by Anglo-American business interests. The war is considered the most significant in China's Warlord era, with the Beijing coup by Christian warlord Feng Yuxiang leading to the overall defeat of the Zhili clique. During the war the two cliques fought one large battle near Tianjin in October 1924, as well as a number of smaller skirmishes and sieges. Afterwards, both Feng and Zhang Zuolin, the latter being ruler of the Fengtian clique, appointed Duan Qirui as a figurehead prime minister. In south and central China, more liberal Chinese were dismayed by the Fengtian's advance and by the resulting power vacuum. A wave of protests followed. The war also distracted the northern warlords from the Soviet-backed Nationalists based in the southern province of Guangdong, allowing unhampered preparation for the Northern Expedition (1926–1928), which united China under the leadership of Chiang Kai-shek.

== Cause ==
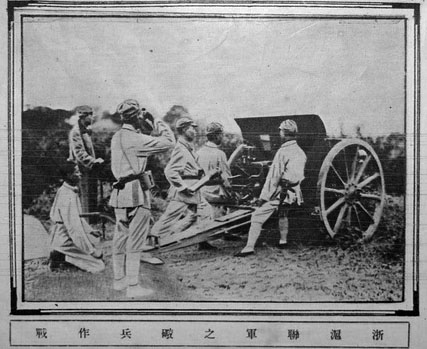
Jiangsu–Zhejiang Warlord Conflict

In March 1924, Zhili clique general Sun Chuanfeng defeated two Anhui clique generals to gain control of Fujian.

By the summer of 1924 the Zhili clique, led by President Cao Kun and supported by the military of Wu Peifu, controlled much of China proper and its internationally recognized Beiyang government. The clique had no national rivals left, enjoying the support of both London and Washington.

The initial cause of the conflict was over the control of Shanghai, China's biggest city and port, which was legally a part of Jiangsu province under the control of Zhili Gen. Qi Xieyuan. However, the city was actually administered by Lu Yongxiang as part of Zhejiang, the last province under the control of the dying Anhui clique (technically Anhui-held territories, including Shandong, were allowed to exist so long as they remained neutral). In September fighting broke out when Zhejiang authorities refused to cede administration of the city to Qi Xieyuan. Zhang Zuolin and Dr. Sun Yat-sen pledged to defend neutral Zhejiang, expanding the conflict to the far north and far south. Indeed, the Fengtian clique was eager to avenge its defeat at the hands of the Zhili clique in the last war and had prepared intensively.

The Zhili clique, on the other hand, had overestimated its own strength and found itself completely ill-prepared for the upcoming Second Zhili–Fengtian War.

== Fengtian's preparation for the war ==
With their previous humiliating defeat at the hands of the Zhili clique on its mind, the Fengtian clique concentrated mainly on military reform and upgrading logistics. Zhang Zuolin simultaneously launched two efforts aimed at improving the Fengtian Army after withdrawing to Northeast China.

Chief of the general staff Yang Yuting was appointed Inspector-General of the Mukden Arsenal and Wang Yintai (王荫泰) was named Director of the Department of Materials. Along with the purchase of more FT tanks, the armory was expanded, with annual production output of around 150 artillery pieces (excluding mortars). Machine-gun output was more than 1000 annually, and the combined total of repaired/refurbished and new rifles averaged more than 60,000 annually. Output for artillery rounds (including for heavy mortars) totaled more than 100,000, while annual production output for rifle rounds averaged 600,000. Additionally, a large number of mortars were also produced and put to great use during the upcoming war.

The air force and navy were also strengthened. Zhang's son, Zhang Xueliang, was named Director of the Aviation Office, assisted by Zhou Peibing (周培炳) and Yao Xijiu (姚锡九). Aircraft from Germany and Italy were added, bringing the total strength to near 300 in four groups. Additional air bases were built in strategic locations. Naval headquarters and a training school were set up in Harbin. Under the Fengtian Security Headquarters, a Directorate of Navigational Policing was formed, with Shen Honglie (沈鸿烈) named as director. This reformed the Northeast China River Defense Flotilla.

To improve communications, additional water and coal supply stations were built in Suizhong, Xingcheng and Dayaogou (大窑沟) for rapid deployment of troops by railroad. Additional railroads were built for evacuation purposes in the event of war. Roads were built for better transportation in areas without rail, and each army had its own wire communications (telephone and telegraph) linked to general headquarters in the rear. Radio communication units were also assigned. To further improve radio communications, radio stations were built in Shenyang, Harbin and Jin County.

In conjunction with logistics improvement, the Fengtian clique implemented military reforms. Immediately after the First Zhili-Fengtian War, brigade commander Bao Deshan (鲍德山) and regimental commander Xu Changyou (许昌有) were blamed for the defeat, court-martialed and executed in the spring of 1923. Advisers in both military and civilian affairs were appointed, with Liang Hongzhi as secretary, and others including Wang Jitang (王揖唐), Zeng Yuxi (曾毓隽), Li Sihao (李思浩). The Northeast China inspector's office (东三省巡阅使署) and Fengtian Viceroy's office (奉天督军署) left from Qing Dynasty were combined to form the Northeast China Security Headquarters (东三省保安司令部) for administrative improvement. A Northeast China Army Reorganization Directorate (东三省陆军整理处) was also formed to specifically administer the reform needs of the Fengtian forces, and Jilin Viceroy Sun Liechen (孙烈臣) was named as inspector-general, while Jiang Dengxuan (姜登选), Han Chuntian (韩田春) and Li Jinglin were named deputy inspector-generals. In the summer of 1923 Xingcheng–Suizhong army command was established at Suizhong County, with Jiang Dengxuan named commander, so that once war broke out the command could be rapidly converted into a front-line headquarters.

Zhang Zongchang recruited White (tsarist) emigres in service of a Russian detachment that he was forming in anticipation of the war. Russian mercenaries in China were numerous due to the previous colony in Manchuria, and Russians working for the Chinese Eastern Railway. For many emigres, serving the northern warlords was a way to continue the fight against the Bolsheviks. Zhang's Russian forces were commanded by Konstantin Petrovich Nechaev from 1924 to 1927. Additionally, Zhang attached a Japanese company to his Russian company in 1924.

The Fengtian army expanded to 27 brigades from its original 25, organized into three armies of three divisions. Each division had three brigades. The cavalry was expanded from three to four divisions, with three brigades forming a division and the rest attached to infantry divisions as cavalry companies. Coupled with the increased output of the Fengtian armory, artillery regiments (equipped with larger pieces) were expanded from four to ten. Each division consisted of three brigades with either an infantry brigade or a combined brigade, and every division had an engineering battalion and a transportation battalion attached. Combined brigades were bolstered with an engineering company and a transportation company, though no such auxiliary formations were assigned to infantry brigades. After thorough reform, the strength of the Fengtian army totaled more than 250,000 troops, and its performance was significantly improved. The best troops were found in the 2nd Brigade, commanded by Zhang Xueliang, and the 6th Brigade, commanded by Guo Songling, and they were viewed as the model units of the Fengtian army.

== Prelude ==
The prelude of the Second Zhili–Fengtian War was the First Jiangsu-Zhejiang War, which broke on 3 September 1924, and provided a direct excuse for the Fengtian clique to start the war. The next day, Zhang Zuolin held a conference at his residence. Every Fengtian army officer ranking brigade commander or higher was in attendance. Here, Zhang decided to formally declare war on the Zhili clique, and on September 13 all trains running on the Beijing–Fengtian Railway stopped.

== Military plans ==
In contrast to the Zhili clique, which failed to make adequate preparation, the Fengtian clique had been drawing up a detailed strategy since spring 1923. This was prepared by staff officers under Fu Xingpei (傅兴沛) and Yu Guohan (于国翰). They predicted that, although the Zhili clique enjoyed overall numerical superiority, its forces were dispersed and could not reach the battlefield if a Fengtian victory was achieved quickly by concentrating a 250,000-strong force against pockets of resistance. There were four major objectives of the Fengtian clique:

Primarily, to annihilate enemy forces and take Beijing and Tianjin. To achieve this, Shanhaiguan needed to be taken, so a Fengtian strike force had to be in the region of Xujialing (徐家岭) on the western bank of Shi He (石河), as well as the adjacent regions to the north and south of Xujialing. Once these regions were secured, Fengtian forces would need to gather near Shanhaiguan and launch an assault to capture it. This task force would consist of the 1st Army and 2nd Army, designated as a Combined Corps. After taking Shanhaiguan, it would continue its push toward Beijing and Tianjin.

If Shanhaiguan could not be taken, at least two brigades were needed in the region of Qiansuo (前所), a railroad station 20 km east of Shanhaiguan. After the region was secured, the main force would deploy around Suizhong County for another attempt to take Shanhaiguan.

Next, the 2nd Army would march on Rehe, Yi County and Dayaogou, 5 km north of Jin County. This Fengtian task force was to take Chaoyang, Jianping and Chengde, reaching west of Lingyuan, its main target. Most of this responsibility was assigned to Zhang Zongchang's 3rd Combined Brigade, with the exception of those taking Chaoyang, which was assigned to Li Jinglin's 1st Division. The latter would launch his offensive from Yi County. After achieving its objectives, the 2nd Task Force would assist the Combined Corps in taking Shanhaiguan, after which it would enter Lengkou Pass (冷口关) and attack Luanzhou via Qian'an County.

Thirdly, Fengtian cavalry group would attack Rehe from Zhangwu via Jianping and Fuxin, with the initial target be the capture of Chifeng. The cavalry group was also to cover the flank of the other Fengtian forces, and mop up any enemy left behind. When the situation permitted, the cavalry would also strike the Zhili force's flank by entering the Great Wall via Xifengkou (喜峰口) and/or Gubeikou passes.

Finally, the Fengtian general reserve would be stationed between Xingcheng and Suizhong county, to guard Jinzhou. The 4th Army was assigned and supported by the 5th Army, which would come to its aid when needed. The Fengtian Air Force was headquartered at Shenyang, with three groups mobilized for the war effort. Two of these groups were under the direct command of the Combined Corps of Fengtian army, while the remaining one was deployed to Yi County, under the direct command of Zhang Xueliang's 2nd Army. Additional airfields with depot stations were constructed to support air force operations, which were mainly for reconnaissance and ground support.

All task forces had to ensure uninterrupted communication so they could be coordinated to achieve victory. Although the military plan remained unchanged, portions of it did not materialize due to the rapid victory achieved.

== Political maneuvers ==
In addition to military planning, the Fengtian clique also used political maneuvering by founding an anti-Zhili clique triple alliance with Dr. Sun Yat-sen in Guangdong and Anhui warlord Lu Yongxiang (卢永详) in Zhejiang. Attempts to fracture the Zhili clique from within by convincing Feng Yuxiang to defect also succeeded, as in the spring of 1923 Zhang Xueliang personally wrote a letter to Feng and sent his most trusted lieutenant, Fu Xingpei, to Beijing to secretly meet him. After reaching Beijing, Fu first met Feng's chief of staff Liu Ji (刘骥) at a secluded location on Dajue (大觉) Hutong. Liu telephoned Fu the next day to tell him Feng was eager to meet. Fu Xingpei and Feng Yuxiang met at Nanyuan, where Feng informed Fu that it was unsafe for the diplomat to stay in Beijing too long, and asked him to immediately leave.

Although the first meeting was brief, it was successful, paving the way for follow-up meetings between Feng Yuxiang and Fengtian clique representatives Guo Yingzhou (郭瀛洲) and Ma Bingnan (马炳南). To avoid suspicion, politicians and warlords of the nominally neutral Anhui clique were enlisted to act as middlemen. For example, Anhui clique warlord Wu Guangxin (吴光新) was a trusted courier for both sides and relayed information by personally traveling between Beijing and Shenyang (Fengtian). When the Fengtian clique gave Feng Yuxiang 2,000,000 yen of Japanese bribes for his support and defection, the money was delivered by Anfu Club politician Jia Deyao (贾德耀).

== Order of battle ==
Around half a million troops were mobilized in total, with 200,000 in the Zhili clique, and a quarter million in the Fengtian clique.

=== Order of battle of Fengtian clique ===
Commander-in-chief: Zhang Zuolin

- Chief of general staff: Yang Yuting
- Deputy chief of general staff: Fu Xingpei (傅兴沛)
- 1st Army commanded by Jiang Dengxuan (姜登选), with deputy commander Han Linchun (韓麟春), including:
  - 10th Combined Brigade commanded by Sun Xuchang (孙旭昌).
- 2nd Army commanded by Zhang Xueliang, with deputy commander Guo Songling
- 3rd Army commanded by Li Jinglin, with deputy commander Zhang Zongchang
- 4th Army commanded by Jilin Viceroy Zhang Zuoxiang, designated as the general reserve
- 5th Army commanded by Heilongjiang Viceroy Wu Junsheng, including:
  - 29th Division
  - Two combined brigades

=== Order of battle of Zhili clique ===
Commander-in-chief: Wu Peifu

- 1st Army commanded by Peng Shouhua (彭寿华), including:
  - 13th Combined brigade commanded by Feng Yurong (冯玉荣)
- 2nd Army commanded by Wang Huaiqing (王怀庆), including
  - Yi (毅) Army commanded by Mi Zhengbiao (米振标)
  - 13th Division
- 3rd Army commanded by Feng Yuxiang (did not fight Fengtian clique, and later defected to Fengtian side)
- Henan – Shanxi Army commanded by Zhang Fulai (张福来)

== Initial stage ==
On September 15 Zhang Zuolin led the Fengtian Army to Manchuria's borders and engaged the army of Wu Peifu, the Zhili clique's greatest strategist. Striking toward Rehe and Shanhaiguan, and regrouping in Suizhong, the 1st and 3rd Fengtian Armies approached Zhili positions east of Yuguan (榆关). On September 18 the opposing armies met, with battle drastically intensifying after September 28. Fengtian assaults on Shanhaiguan were thrown back as Zhili forces took up defensive positions and enjoyed geographical advantages. Meanwhile, as agreed previously, Dr. Sun Yat-sen personally led his army north to prevent Sun Chuanfang from reinforcing his Zhili comrades in the north, but a rebellion by the Canton Merchant Corps and Chen Jiongming loyalists broke out in Guangzhou. Sun Yat-sen was forced to turn back to put down this rebellion in his home territory. While a minor skirmish continued the battle in the north, the southern campaign proved to be the first major conflict fought by cadets and officers trained at the Whampoa Military Academy. Since Sun Yat-sen retreated, Sun Chuanfang's armies were left available to take both Zhejiang and Shanghai.

In contrast to the bogged-down siege at Shanhaiguan, the Fengtian army made quick progress on the Rehe front. The rag-tag Yi (毅) Army led by Mi Zhengbiao (米振标) that the Zhili clique deployed was unable to stop Zhang Zongchang's 2nd Army, despite being reinforced by the 13th Division of Wang Huaiqing (王怀庆)'s 2nd Zhili Army. Between September 15–22 vanguards of the 2nd Fengtian Army led by Zhang Zongchang ventured as far as Chaoyang and attacked Lingyuan. Fengtian cavalry took Fuxing and Jianping after venturing out from Zhangwu on September 15, and on October 7 they took Chifeng. By October 9 regions adjacent to Chifeng were firmly secure. By now the Fengtian General Reserve had still not joined the fight, and the situation for the Zhili forces was bad enough for Wu Peifu to personally travel to Shanhaiguan. Unbeknown to the Zhili forces, the Fengtian clique's prewar maneuver had paid off: Feng Yuxiang, commander of the 3rd Zhili Army, had already signed a secret treaty with Duan Qirui and Zhang Zuolin, and was secretly plotting a coup. When the 2nd Zhili Army under Wang Huaiqing suffered its initial defeat and requested assistance, Feng refused to help; instead, he ordered his 3rd Army to stay put at Gubeikou pass.

== Shanhaiguan front ==
The Shanhaiguan front consisted of two major sectors: the Shanhaiguan sector and the Jiumenkou (九门口) sector. The 1st and 3rd Fengtian Armies deployed in the Shanhaiguan sector did not make any progress because they faced crack troops enjoying the advantage of terrain. The stalemate was not broken until October 7, when the Fengtian army made progress in the Jiumenkou sector. Here Sun Xuchang (孙旭昌), a Fengtian commander, led his 10th Combined Brigade to victory. Feng Yurong (冯玉荣), commander of the 13th Combined Zhili Brigade facing them, committed suicide. The victorious Fengtian army continued to press the attack, taking the commanding heights near the region of Shimenzhai (石门寨) and threatening the rear of the Zhili army from its left flank. Realizing their danger, Zhili troops counterattacked, spearheaded by the 14th Division of Jin Yunpeng. After October 12 Wu Peifu personally went to Yuguan to take charge, redeploying reinforcements as he went.

Reinforcements of the Zhili Henan–Shanxi Army, led by Zhang Fulai (张福来), soon arrived and from October 13-November 24 attacked Fengtian positions along Shimenzhai in the Jiumenkou sector. Fengtian troops, in turn, reinforced their line with three combined brigades. Jiang Dengxuan and Han Linchun, commander and deputy commander respectively of the 1st Fengtian Army, went to the front line to command personally. Despite additional reinforcements and the advantage of terrain, the Fengtian defense was crumbling and many company and battalion commanders were dead or wounded, mostly near Heichuyao (黑出窑) where a regimental commander named An Lun (安伦) died, the highest-ranking Fengtian officer killed in the war. At the same time the main Fengtian force at Shanhaiguan failed to make any progress after two days of continuous attacks on the Zhili defenders.

In the meantime the Fengtian army received unconfirmed intelligence—provided by the Japanese—that the Zhili clique had enlisted the help of 13 ships of the Zhengji (政记) Shipping Company to transport three to four divisions directly to the rear of the Fengtian forces via the Taku Forts. However, no intelligence could be obtained on the exact landing spot chosen, though possible sites included Yingkou and Huludao. Most Fengtian officers wanted to deploy the General Reserve as a rear guard, but Fu Xingpei, the deputy chief of general staff, opposed the idea, claiming the urgent situation on the battlefield would not allow a division of forces and the General Reserve had to be sent to the Jiumenkou sector. Yang Yuting, the Fengtian chief of general staff, worried that the geography of Jiumenkou was too narrow and too restricted to deploy large numbers of troops. Zhang Zuolin put an end to the debate by ordering the General Reserve, under the command of Zhang Zuoxiang, to rush to Jiumenkou and join the battle.

== Critical moment ==
Despite committing the General Reserve, the Fengtian army was unable to defeat its enemy. Zhang Xueliang and Guo Songling decided to secretly redeploy eight infantry regiments and two artillery brigades from Shanhaiguan sector to Jiumenkou. These secretly redeployed troops would be led by Guo Songling, but a personal conflict within the officers' corps almost cost the chance of a Fengtian victory. The incident began when artillery battalion commander Yan Zongzhou (阎宗周), a classmate of Guo Songling, was removed from command. Guo Songling originally had command of Yan Zongzhou's artillery brigade, and only when the war had begun was the artillery brigade temporarily reassigned to the 1st Army. Artillery Regimental Commander Chen Chen (陈琛) subsequently relieved Yan Zongzhou of his command, with the approval of Jiang Dengxuan and Han Linchun, commander and deputy commander of the 1st Army.

Upon hearing his classmate Yan Zongzhou's complaint, the enraged Guo Songling personally relieved Chen Chen of command and gave it back to Yan. Jiang Dengxuan and Han Linchun were deeply embarrassed at this nepotism, and Han Linchun personally complained to Zhang Zuolin about Guo's actions. Zhang ordered both Yan Zongzhou and Chen Chen back to their original commands, but this further enraged Guo Songling. He moved his 8th Infantry Regiment away from the battlefield and retreated to the rear. Zhang Xueliang immediately went to look for Guo and his troops once he learned what had happened: luckily for him, he managed to find the wayward officer and convince him to carry out the original plan. It was fortuitous for the Fengtian army that the incident occurred at night and was not detected by the opposing Zhili army, as the gap left by Guo could have been easily exploited. Sun Xuchang's 10th Fengtian Brigade, with support of the artillery unit, was able to seize Nine Gates and rout the Zhili defenders.

== Rehe front ==
On the Rehe front the 2nd Fengtian Army began its offensive on September 22, and succeeded in taking Lingyuan and Pingquan. After a short resupply Zhang Zongchang renewed his offensive against the Zhili forces by attacking Lengkou Pass. Zhili troops were deployed in four divisions: the 20th commanded by Yan Zhitang (阎治堂), the 9th commanded by Dong Zhengguo (董政国), the Shaanxi 1st commanded by Hu Jingyi (胡景翼) and the 23rd commanded by Wang Chengbin (王承斌). However, the latter two had already made a pact with Feng Yuxiang and did nothing to stop Zhang Zongchang's attack. At the same time the first two units were led by rival officers who refused to fight so as to preserve their own strength. When the Fengtian forces attacked, all retreated and abandoned Lengkou. Seizing the opportunity, Zhang Zongchang pushed deep into enemy territory, with Li Jinglin following close behind. As the news of a Zhili victory in the Jiangsu-Zhejiang War reached the battlefield, the likelihood of a stalemate appeared increasingly plausible.

== Unexpected end ==
On October 22 Feng Yuxiang, commander of the 3rd Zhili Army, betrayed his superiors by mounting the Beijing coup against President Cao Kun. Cao was deposed as president and placed under house arrest for the next two years. Wu Peifu, still at the Shanhaiguan front, was enraged and pulled his army away to rescue Beijing. As a result, up to 8,000 troops from Wu's 3rd and 26th Divisions were withdrawn on October 26, leaving behind only 4,000 men. Seeing an opening, Zhang ordered his army to pursue Wu. Zhang Zongchang and Li Jinglin led their troops southward along the Luan River toward Luanzhou, where they pushed on to Tianjin. On October 18 Zhang Zongchang's troops took the train station at Luanzhou. Along with the successful capture of Jiumenkou by Sun Xuchang's 10th Brigade, Zhang Zongchang's successful taking of Luanzhou had helped secure the Fengtian clique's final victory.

With infantry support, Fengtian cavalry took Xifengkou Pass and pushed on. The Zhili troops' morale was shattered by news of Feng Yuxiang's betrayal. Guo Songling, who had caused so many troubles with his nepotism, grasped the chance for an all-out charge on the Zhili troops and successfully gained control of vast regions to the east. Subsequently, cut off and surrounded between Qinhuangdao and Shanhaiguan by October 31, with the exception of a few top-ranking Zhili officers who managed to escape by ships leaving Qinhuangdao, the Zhili forces were surrounded. More than 40,000 of them surrendered to the Fengtian army.

As Wu Peifu retreated to Tianjin, he concentrated his troops in Yangcun (杨村) and telegraphed Zhili forces in Jiangsu, Hubei, Henan and Zhejiang for reinforcements. However, Anhui clique warlord Zheng Shiqi in Shandong suddenly declared neutrality and took Cangzhou and Machang. In addition, Zheng Shishang's forces completely destroyed sections of Jinpu railway at Hanzhuang.

Yan Xishan ordered his force to take Shijiazhuang on the same day, severing the railway of the Jinghan railway. As a result, none of Wu Peifu's reinforcements could reach him. On November 2 Feng Yuxiang's forces took Yangcun and Beicang (北仓), forcing Wu Peifu to relocate his headquarters to Junliangcheng. In the meantime, the Fengtian army took Tangshan and Lutai. Duan Qirui wrote to Wu Peifu, telling him to leave by sea. Facing an attack from all sides, Wu had no choice but to escape. With his remaining 2000 troops he boarded the military transport Huajia (华甲) at 11:00 am on November 3 and sailed from Tanggu to central China, where Sun Chuanfang protected him from further Fengtian incursions.

== Aftermath ==
After November 3 the war was effectively over, with a Zhili loss of all of its northern provinces to Zhang Zuolin and Feng Yuxiang's Guominjun. Fighting continued well into 1925 as part of the Jiangsu-Zhejiang War when a joint Anhui-Fengtian expedition briefly retook Jiangsu and Shanghai in January. Here, trapped without backup, Zhili warlord Qi Xieyuan resigned and fled to Japan, but not before transferring his armies to Sun Chuanfang. Sun then launched a counterattack and drove Zhang Zongchang out of Zhejiang. Duan gave Shandong, the last Anhui-held province, to Zhang as a token of their alliance. The myth of Zhili invincibility had been entirely shattered.

A new provisional government with the Anhui clique's Duan Qirui as figurehead was created to balance the interests of Feng and Zhang. Sun Yatsen was invited north to discuss reunification but the talks were cut short due to his death from cancer. Within a year strong differences between the Christian Feng and Japanese-backed Zhang would cause both to solicit their recent Zhili enemies as allies, and by November 1925 the Zhili clique had thrown its support behind Zhang. Feng managed the defection of Guo Songling (who continued to smart over his treatment during the Nine Gates battle) from the Fengtian clique, sparking the Anti-Fengtian War that lasted until April 1926. It would lead to the collapse of the provisional government.

The war of 1924 was more destructive than previous warlord turmoil and bankrupted the Beijing government. As more Chinese looked to the KMT and Communist parties for leadership, they began to disparage and delegitimize the northern leaders by calling them junfa (warlords). At this time the KMT and Communists were allied in the First United Front, which controlled Guangdong Province, and were backed by the Soviets. The weakness of the warlord administration and the victory of the pro-Japanese Zhang Zuolin was one of a multitude of threads that led to a nationalistic backlash called the May Thirtieth Movement.

== See also ==
- Chinese Civil War
- First Zhili-Fengtian War
- List of battles of the Chinese Civil War
- National Revolutionary Army
- Warlord era
- Wu Peifu
- Zhang Zuolin
