= Qi Xieyuan =

Chinese warlord

Qi Xieyuan 齊燮元
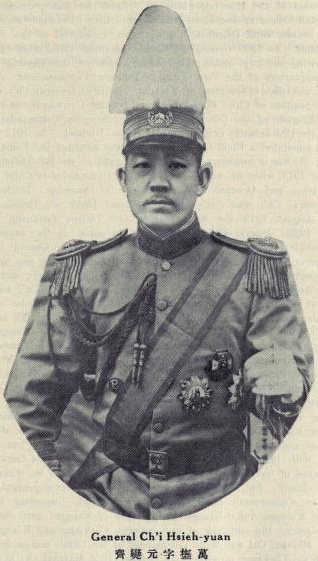
- An image of Qi Xieyuan in Who's Who in China (3rd edition)
- Born: Qi Ying 齊英; April 28, 1885; Shuntian Prefecture, Ninghe District (now a part of Tianjin), Qing Empire
- Died: December 18, 1946 (Aged 61); Nanjing, Republic of China
- Other names: Fuwan, Yaoshan
- Education: Tianjin Military Academy; Imperial Japanese Army Academy
- Occupation: General
- Awards: Order of Rank and Merit; Order of the Precious Brilliant Golden Grain; Order of Wen-Hu

Qi Xieyuan (Chinese: 齊燮元; Wade–Giles: Ch'i Hsieh-yuan; April 28, 1885 (Note: Asahi Shimbun claims Qi was born in 1879, but the Great Dictionary of the Republic of China and History of the Beiyang Clique claim he was born in 1885. The Origins of the First United Front in China: The Role of Sneevliet claims he was born in 1897.) - December 18, 1946), born Qi Ying, with a courtesy name of Qi Fuwan and the art name of Yaoshan, was a general of the military of the Republic of China and a warlord of the Zhili clique. He defected to the Japanese after the creation of the Provisional Government of the Republic of China, later participating in the North China Political Council, its successor.

== Zhili commander ==
=== Early career ===
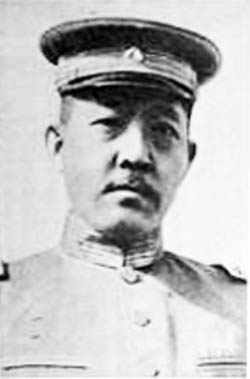
A picture of Qi Xieyuan from Dongfang Zazhi's 22nd issue, article 3, "The Question of the Southeast Heats Up Again"

Born in what is now part of Tianjin, (Note: Sources differ on where Qi was from. Some say he was a native of Ningbo, while others claim he was from Tianjin.) Qi Xieyuan studied at the Tianjin Military Academy (also known as the Beiyang Military Academy), attending the Army University and subsequently the Imperial Japanese Army Academy after graduating. He was a shengyuan of the Qing Imperial examination system. He entered the 6th Division of the Beiyang Army, beginning his military career. In 1913, he served as the brigade commander of the 12th Brigade of the 6th Division, the commander of the 6th Division itself, as well as the Chief of Staff of Jiangxi province.

In 1917, Qi Xieyuan followed fellow Zhili clique figure Li Chun to Jiangsu province. Qi Xieyuan served as the military governor of Jiangning (Nanjing), as well as the deputy military governor of Jiangsu, Anhui, and Jiangxi provinces. In 1920, Li Chun committed suicide and was succeeded as military governor of Jiangsu and a military official of Jiangsu, Anhui and Jiangxi.

=== Second Zhili–Fengtian War ===
In August and September 1923, Qi almost went to war with Zhejiang, outraged by Anhui clique general and military governor of Zhejiang Lu Yongxiang's efforts to support anti-Zhili elements within parliament. He almost went to war again in November 1923, when Xu Guoliang, the Zhili-aligned police commissioner of Shanghai, was assassinated by Lu's associates, but was urged not to by Wu Peifu in Beijing.

In order to preserve peace, especially in the commercial and economic hub of Shanghai, Qi and Lu negotiated. Shanghai signed bilateral non-aggression treaties with Hubei, Anhui, and Jiangxi. Furthermore, in August 1923, Qi and Lu signed an agreement to not take allies, to not allow any other warlord armies to pass through their provinces, and to not augment their own armies.

However, on September 3, 1924, Qi went to war with Lu Yongxiang over the absorption of a warlord army, breaking their agreement, thus beginning the Jiangsu-Zhejiang War. With the support of Fujian governor Sun Chuanfang, Qi defeated Lu, delivering him a crushing defeat at Shanghai. However, the Jiangsu-Zhejiang War had sparked the Second Zhili–Fengtian War, which saw the Zhili clique declaring war on the Northern Fengtian clique, who had, since their first war with the Zhili, built up their forces and equipment. The Fengtian clique had sent General Zhang Zongchang South, leading to Sun and Qi proclaiming the Jiangsu–Zhejiang Allied Army to resist him. However, Sun was encircled by the army of Duan Qirui (Anhui clique), and abandoned Qi. Qi, cut off from Sun, was defeated and dismissed, later moving to Japan.

In 1925, Qi returned to Hubei and was appointed by Wu Peifu as the deputy commander of the Anti-Thief Allied Army (taozei lianjun). However, following the Northern Expedition, Qi was forced to step down.

== Central Plains War ==
In 1930, Yan Xishan and Feng Yuxiang challenged Chiang Kai-shek for leadership of the Republic of China in the Central Plains War, and was appointed as protector of Jiangbei. However, after his defeat in the Central Plains War, Qi fled to the British concession in Tianjin. He later moved to Beiping.

== Pro-Japanese activities ==
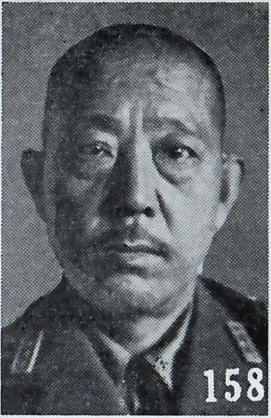
Qi Xieyuan in Asahi Shimbun, 1941

In December 1937, Wang Kemin established the Provisional Government of the Republic of China. Qi Xieyuan participated in it, and was appointed Head of Law Enforcement. He was also made a member of the Committee of the Qingxiang Administration and the Parliamentary Committee.

In March 1940, with the entry of the Provisional Government into the Wang Jingwei regime in Nanjing, Qi joined with it. He was appointed a member of the North China Administrative Committee. He supervised the General Administration of Justice. He organized the North China Appeasement Army (Huabei Jingjing Jun) and assumed the role of Commander-in-Chief of the army's General Command. He was also a member of the Military Commission Committee. In February 1943, Qi was appointed as the deputy speaker at the advisory meeting of the North China Administrative Committee.

In August 1945, after the surrender of Japan in World War II, Qi Xieyuan was arrested by the National Government for the crime of treason. On December 18, 1946, Qi was executed.
