= Sun Chuanfang =

Chinese warlord (1885–1935)

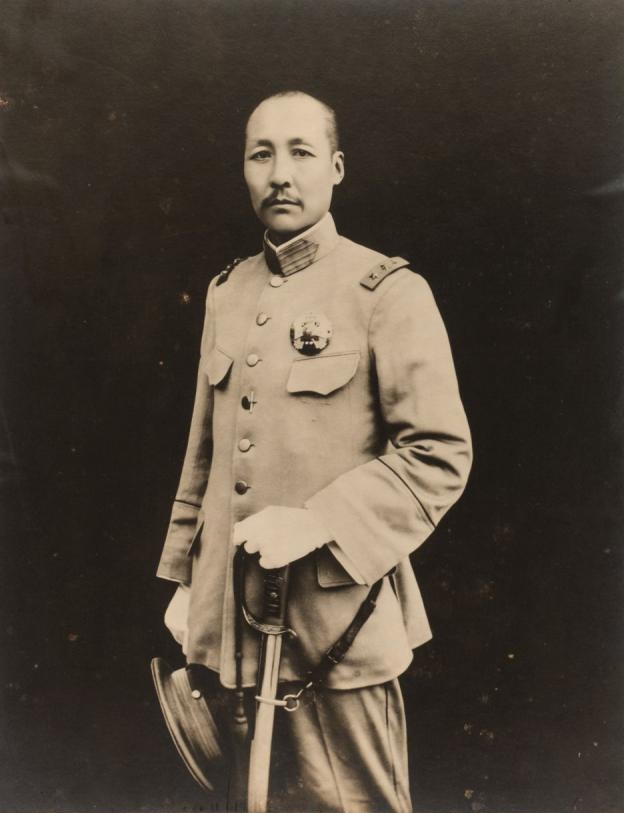
- Born: April 17, 1885; Licheng, Shandong, Qing dynasty
- Died: November 13, 1935 (aged 50); Tianjin, Republic of China
- Occupation: Warlord
- Awards: Order of Rank and Merit; Order of Wen-Hu

Sun Chuanfang (simplified Chinese: 孙传芳; traditional Chinese: 孫傳芳; pinyin: Sūn Chuánfāng; Wade–Giles: Sun Ch'uan-fang) (April 17, 1885 – November 13, 1935) was a Chinese warlord in the Zhili clique and protégé of the "Jade Marshal" Wu Peifu.

== Early life and education ==
Sun Chuanfang was born in Licheng, Shandong Province. Wang Yingkai, a rising officer in the Beiyang Army and protégé of Yuan Shikai, the commander of the Beiyang Army, married Sun's sister, and Sun took advantage of his brother-in-law's position and joined a training camp in 1902. Wang later recommended Sun to Tianjin Military Academy because of the latter's outstanding capabilities; in 1904 he also sent Sun abroad to Japan for more education at the Tokyo Shimbu Gakko, a military preparatory school. Sun eventually graduated from the sixth class of the Imperial Japanese Army Academy and returned to China in 1908. Upon his return from Japan, Wang and his political ally, Tie Liang, happened to be the ones presiding over the examination aimed at testing fresh graduates’ ability. Sun passed the tests and became an officer of the Beiyang Army and later was recruited by Wang Zhanyuan to join the Zhili clique following the Xinhai Revolution, rising quickly through the ranks.

== Career ==
Map showing the territory of Sun Chuanfang during the Northern Expedition

Sun became the military governor of Fujian on 20 March 1923. He was based in Hubei Province, and fought in the Zhili–Anhui War of 1920.

In March 1924, Sun defeated two Anhui clique generals to gain control of Fujian Province.

In 1924, at the beginning of the Jiangsu-Zhejiang War, Sun commanded the 4th Army in Fujian. One of his first acts was to support his ally Qi Xieyuan, moving up from the south in a move that was responsible for the defeat of rival warlord Lu Yongxiang and the capture of Shanghai. He also subsequently became the director-general of the Shanghai-Woosung port. He was subsequently rewarded with the military governorship of Zhejiang (20 September 1924-19 December 1926). However, his Zhili allies in the north were defeated during the Second Zhili–Fengtian War, ending with the Zhili clique losing all of its northern provinces to Zhang Zuolin and Feng Yuxiang's Guominjun. In 1925 the Guominjun launched a joint Anhui-Fengtian expedition under Zhang Zongchang, briefly retaking Jiangsu and Shanghai in January. Lacking support from Sun Chuanfang, Qi Xieyuan was forced to resign and fled to Japan, but not before transferring what remained of his demoralized and severely diminished army to Sun Chuanfang's command.

Zhang Zongchang and Sun Chuanfang were now staring at each other over a battle line delineated only by Shanghai proper. For the remainder of the year the two opposing generals bided their time. Then, in the fall of 1925, the chance came: Sun launched a counterattack that drove Zhang Zongchang and his forces out of the Chinese districts of Shanghai. For the next two years Sun expanded his rule to include all of Jiangsu, Zhejiang, Fujian, Anhui and Jiangxi. He established his headquarters in Nanjing as military governor of Jiangsu on 25 November 1925. At the height of his power he held an army which numbered over 200,000 men.

The Northern Expedition effectively ended his rule. His forces were decisively defeated twice and then were routed in the Battle of Lungtan, resulting in the collapse of his rule. Shanghai was captured by Communist labor unions allied with the National Revolutionary Army in March 1927 and Sun was forced to flee Nanjing. He briefly sought the support of Zhang Xueliang but, distrusting Zhang's motives, then fled to Dalian in the Japanese Kwantung Leased Territory. He participated in the Fengtian clique's Peking government until 1930, when he went into retirement after the Manchurian Incident of 1931.

== Death ==
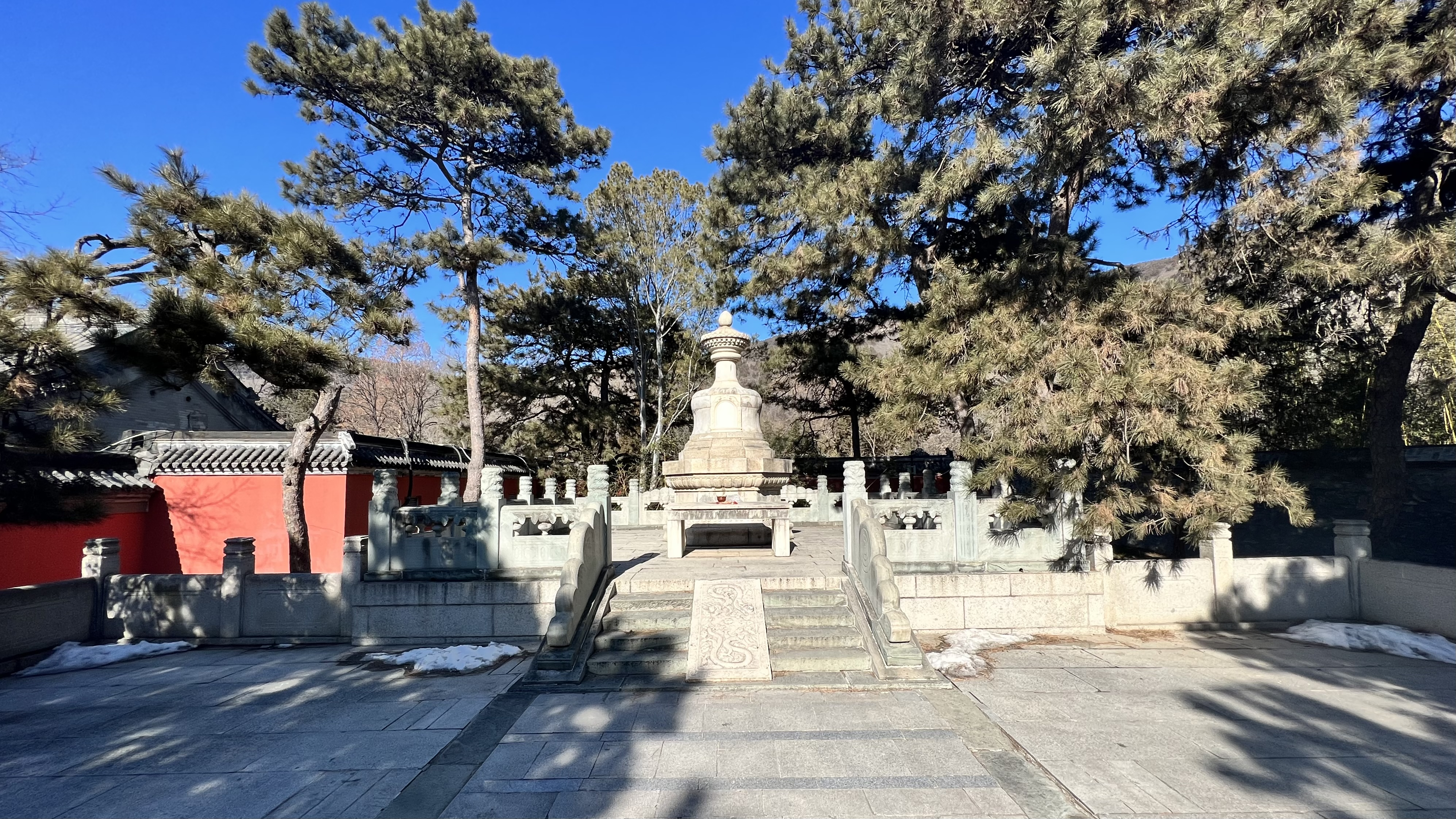
Tomb of Sun Chuanfang in Haidian, Beijing

Sun relocated to the British concession of Tianjin, where he took the tonsure and announced his retirement from worldly affairs in favor of becoming a Buddhist monk. However, on 13 November 1935 Sun was assassinated in Tianjin by Shi Jianqiao, the daughter of Shi Congbin, who ten years earlier had been commander of units in Shandong. In October 1925, during the second war between the Zhili and Fengtian cliques, Shi Congbin had been captured by Sun Chuanfang, who had had him summarily decapitated and his head mounted on a pike. Following the assassination, Shi Jianqiao was convicted for murder, but was later pardoned by the Kuomintang government.

== See also ==
- List of Warlords
- Warlord Era
- Zhili Clique
- History of the Republic of China

== Sources ==
- Rulers: Chinese Administrative divisions, Fujian, Jiangsu, Zhejiang
