= Jiangsu–Zhejiang War =

1924 war in China

The Jiangsu–Zhejiang War (3 September to 12 October 1924) was a conflict in Warlord era China fought between the Zhili clique and the remnants of the Anhui clique for control over Zhejiang and Shanghai. It ended with the defeat of the Anhui clique forces and the Zhili clique obtaining control over Zhejiang and Shanghai.

== History ==
Following the Zhili clique's victory in the 1922 First Zhili-Fengtian War, its power expanded as it took control of Rehe (Jehol), Chahar, and Suiyan and consolidated its control over Henan. It also continued to control Beijing and thus controlled China's central government.

In March 1924, the Zhili clique further improved its position when Zhili clique general Sun Chuanfang's forces defeated two Anhui clique generals in Fujian, gaining control of that province. As a result, Zhejiang and Shanghai were some of the limited areas not under Zhili control (the others were Zhang Zuolin and the Fengtian clique's control of Manchuria, and the areas controlled by Sun Yat-sen's Kuomintang in the far south).

Lu Yongxiang, the Anhui clique general in Shanghai, allowed the Anhui clique generals and their troops who had been defeated in Fujian to enter Shanghai. The Zhili clique governor of Jiangsu, General Qi Xieyuan, deemed this to be a violation of the agreement that Shanghai would remain neutral. On 3 September, his forces attacked the Anhui forces in Zhejiang and Shanghai, beginning the Jiangsu–Zhejiang War.

Zhang Zuolin viewed this attack as a threat to his position and began preparing his forces for war. In turn, Zhili forces led by Wu Peifu, Cao Kun, and Feng Yuxiang began preparations to fight the Fengtian clique and moved their forces toward Shanhaiguan. On 15 September, these forces began fighting in the Second Zhili-Fengtian War.

== The fighting ==
The Zhili clique's strategy focused on overwhelming the Anhui clique forces in Shanghai, theorising that this would allow a quick victory before Zhang's forces in the north could attack the Zhili clique-controlled territories. In turn, the Anhui clique forces sought to hold out as long as possible to allow time for Zhang's forces to begin fighting or for the Kuomintang to enter the fight in the south.

Initial fighting around the Jiangsu-Shanghai border became a stalemate. Zhili clique forces had greater numbers and better supplies of weaponry. Anhui clique forces were better organised and had particularly effective placement and usage of machine guns.

While that perimeter stalemated, Zhili clique forces led by Sun Chuanfeng achieved a breakthrough in Zhejiang. Lu Yongxiang, the Anhui clique general, retreated from Zhejiang and concentrated on defending Shanghai. On 21 September, the Zhejiang naval forces switched sides, leaving the Anhui clique undefended in Shanghai waters.

== Conclusion ==
The Jiangsu–Zhejiang War ended on 12 October 1924. Lu Yongxiang retired and fled via ship. The Zhili clique gained control of Zhejiang and Shanghai.
