= Lu Yongxiang (warlord) =

Chinese warlord (1867–1933)

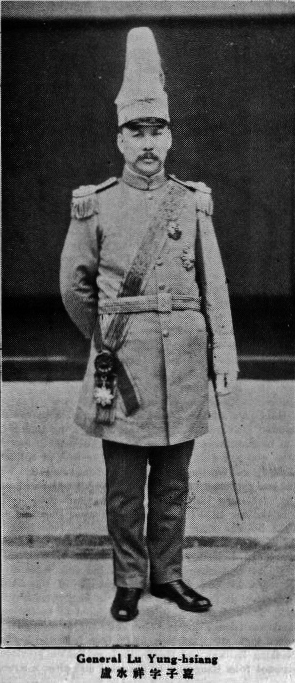
Lu Yongxiang

Lu Yongxiang (Chinese: 盧永祥; Chinese: 卢永祥; pinyin: Lú Yǒngxiáng; Wade–Giles: Lu^{2} Yung^{3}-hsiang^{2}; IPA: [lú i̯ʊ̌ŋɕi̯ɑ́ŋ] October 22, 1867 – May 15, 1933) was an Anhui clique warlord and military governor of Zhejiang, Zhili, and Jiangsu.

== Biography ==
Lu Yongxiang was born October 22, 1867, in Jiyang, Shandong, China. Impoverished as a child, he joined the Huai Army in 1890. In 1895 he joined the new Beiyang Army, rising to brigade commander. At the time of the 1911 Xinhai Revolution Lu was given command of the Beiyang 3rd Division.

After the Republic of China was established, Lu was appointed commander of the Beiyang Tenth Division, guarding Zhejiang. For joining Duan Qirui, as part of the Anhui clique Lu was made military governor of Zhejiang from August 14, 1919 to September 7, 1924.

Near the end of his term as Zhejiang governor he fell out with his counterpart, Jiangsu governor Qi Xieyuan, over control of Shanghai. Their conflict became the Jiangsu-Zhejiang War. Lu was defeated by Qi and his Zhili clique allies, most importantly Sun Chuanfang, when Sun attacked from the south. His control over Zhejiang collapsed when the local civil administration under Xia Chao defected to the Zhili clique. On October 13, 1924, Lu retired and sought asylum in Japan.

After the Beijing coup on November 11, Duan Qirui appointed Lu as military governor of Zhili Province. After a month he was replaced, but he was made military governor of Jiangsu on January 16, 1925, after a joint Anhui-Fengtian expedition under Zhang Zongchang briefly retook Jiangsu and Shanghai in January. He left office on August 5, 1925, replaced by Yang Yuting as Zhang Zuolin's army entered the province. When Sun Chuanfang invaded the province and drove Zhang Zongchang out, Lu fled to Tianjin, where he lived in seclusion until he died in 1933.

== Awards and decorations ==
- Order of Rank and Merit
- Order of the Golden Grain
- Order of Wen-Hu

== See also ==
- Jianqiao Airfield

== Sources ==
- Rulers: Chinese Administrative divisions, Jiangsu, Zhejiang, Zhili
- Waldron, Arthur (2002). From War to Nationalism: China's Turning Point, 1924-1925. Cambridge: Cambridge University Press. ISBN 978-0-521-52332-5.
- Kwong, Chi Man (2017). War and Geopolitics in Interwar Manchuria. Zhang Zuolin and the Fengtian Clique during the Northern Expedition. Leiden: Brill Publishers.
- Esherick, Joseph (2013). China: How the Empire Fell. New York: Routledge, Taylor & Francis Group. ISBN 978-0415831017.
