= Zhili clique =

Chinese faction during the Warlord Era

- 直隸系軍閥
- The Peiyang Star, which was derived from the five-coloured flag of the Republic of China
- Active: 1920–1928
- Country: Republic of China
- Allegiance: Beiyang government
- Type: Warlord faction
- Engagements: Zhili–Anhui War; First Zhili–Fengtian War; Second Zhili–Fengtian War; Northern Expedition

Commanders
- President: Feng Guozhang, Cao Kun

The Zhili clique (Chinese: 直隸系軍閥; pinyin: Zhílì xì jūnfá) was a military faction that split from the Republic of China's Beiyang Army during the country's Warlord Era. It was named for Zhili Province (modern-day Hebei), which was the clique's base of power. At its height, it also controlled Jiangsu, Jiangxi, and Hubei.

The Beiyang Army fragmented following the death of Yuan Shikai, who had been the only person keeping regional factions from contesting territory throughout China. Unlike other cliques, Zhili was formed by army officers, who felt they had been snubbed by Premier Duan Qirui regarding appointments and promotions. These officers rallied around President Feng Guozhang, who had to share power with Duan's dominant Anhui clique in the Beiyang government. Lacking strong bonds, they were more willing to abandon or betray one another.

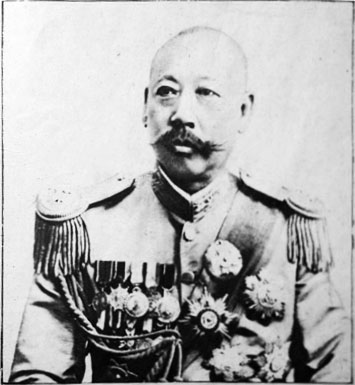
Cao Kun, leader of the Zhili clique following Feng Guozhang's death

They advocated a softer line during the Constitutional Protection War. After Feng's natural death, leadership passed to Cao Kun. Cao was victorious in the Zhili–Anhui War (1920) though the credit belongs to his chief lieutenant, Wu Peifu, who was considered as one of the greatest strategists in China at the time. Relations with the Fengtian clique, which gave nominal assistance against Anhui clique, deteriorated and Wu again brought victory during the First Zhili–Fengtian War (1922). In the next two years, the Zhili clique scored successive victories which led to Cao Kun's ascendancy to the presidency via bribery. Cao's ambition brought all of his enemies against him and created dissent within the clique. Zhili might have won the Second Zhili–Fengtian War (1924) and eventually reunite all of China had it not been for Feng Yuxiang's betrayal with the Beijing Coup. Cao was imprisoned and leadership passed to Wu who along with Sun Chuanfang managed to hold central China for the next two years. During the Kuomintang's Northern Expedition, they created a desperate alliance with their former Fengtian enemies but were defeated entirely. The Zhili clique was the only warlord faction to be destroyed as a result of the Northern Expedition.

Through its influence in the China Maritime Customs Service from 1922 to 1925, the Zhili Clique attempted to ban radio importation. The weakness of the Zhili Clique's government and the disagreement by the foreigners who controlled the Customs Service meant that the ban was easily circumvented.

They were also strongly anti-Japanese. Western powers were sympathetic but provided no support with the exception of foreign private businesses who appreciated their adoption of an anti-communist and anti-union stance in 1923. Wu Peifu had initially invited the Chinese Communist Party to end the Communications Clique's stranglehold over the railways but found the Communists to be a greater threat and put them down with violence.

Following the Zhili clique's victory in the 1922 First Zhili-Fengtian War, its power expanded as it took control of Rehe (Jehol), Chahar, and Suiyuan and consolidated its control over Henan. It also continued to control Beijing, and thus controlled China's central government.

In March 1924, Zhili clique general Sun Chuanfang's forces defeated two Anhui clique generals in Fujian, gaining control of that province. Lu Yongxiang, the Anhui clique general in Shanghai, allowed the defeated Anhui clique generals and their troops to enter Shanghai. The Zhili clique governor of Jiangsu, General Qi Xieyuan, deemed this to be a violation of the agreement that Shanghai would remain neutral. On 3 September, his forces attacked the Anhui forces in Zhejiang and Shanghai, beginning the Jiangsu–Zhejiang War. The war ended on 12 October 1924 with an Anhui defeat and the Zhili clique gained control of Zhejiang and Shanghai.

Zhili again fought Fengtian in the Second Zhili-Fengtian War, which had begun in the north while the Jiangsu-Zhejiang was being fought in the south. The Second Zhili-Fengtian War ended in defeat for Zhili when Zhang Zuolin paid Feng Yuxiang to switch sides, and Feng captured Beijing for the Fengtian clique on 23 October 1924 in the Beijing Coup.

== See also ==
- List of warlords and military cliques in the Warlord Era
- History of the Republic of China
- Seo Wal-bo (An air brigade commander under the Zhili Clique)
