= Xu Qian =

Chinese politician and scholar

- 徐謙
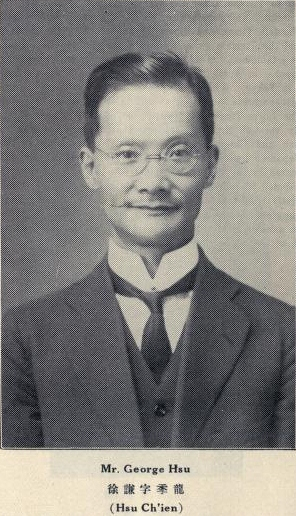

Minister of Justice of the Republic of China
- In office 19 September 1922 – 29 November 1922
- Preceded by: Zhang Yaoceng
- Succeeded by: Xu Shiying
- In office 8 June 1917 – 16 June 1917 (acting)
- Preceded by: Zhang Yaoceng
- Succeeded by: Kiang Yung

Personal details
- Born: 1871 Nanchang, Jiangxi
- Died: 1940 (aged 68–69) British Hong Kong

Xu Qian or George Hsu (Chinese: 徐謙; Wade–Giles: Hsü Ch‘ien; June 15, 1871 – September 26, 1940) was a Chinese politician and jurist. He made important contribution to the judicial system of modern China.

Originated from She County of Anhui province and born in Nanchang of Jiangxi province, Xu Qian passed the highest level of Imperial Examination in 1903 and obtained Jinshi title. He was sent abroad to inspect European and American legal affairs, and participated in the judicial reforms of the late Qing Dynasty. Under the Republic of China, he served as the chief legal officer and director of the school committee of National Wuchang Sun Yat-Sen University (now Wuhan University). He was active in the politics of both the Beiyang government and the Nationalist government for many years. Xu Qian contributed a lot to the establishment and improvement of China's modern judicial system.

== Early life and education ==
Xu Qian was born in the city of Nanchang, Jiangxi, on June 15, 1871. He lost his father at the age of four and was raised by his mother. When he was young, he studied scriptures and history from the Tongcheng School. In 1902, he successfully stood for the Imperial Examination in Nanjing. The next year, he ranked eighth in the Second Class and obtained the Jinshi title, enrolling in Hanlin Academy to study law. Xu Qian had an arrogant attitude towards the teachers, and the Jinshi Hall teacher Cao Rulin once could not bear it and asked the supervisor Zhang Hengjia to resign. Zhang Hengjia invited all the teachers and Xu Qian to a special banquet, and talked about the way of respecting teachers. He returned Cao Rulin's letter of resignation. The teacher Zhang Zongxiang recalled that after a certain criminal law examination, he received a letter from Xu Qian beginning "My dear friend", considered a disrespectful way for a student to address his teacher. Xu Qian's test paper was therefore "submitted to the Academic Affairs Office... and no points were awarded." After mediation by the Minister of Management and Education, Xu Qian withdrew his offending letter.

== Career ==
In 1907, Xu Qian graduated and was made counselor in the Ministry of Justice, where he presided over the Law Compilation and Inspection Office and participated in the formulation of new laws. One important law he participated in the drafting of was the "Regulations on the Reform of the Judicial System". In 1908, he served as the director of a local court and handled more than a thousand cases a year for several years. Later, he was promoted to Higher Court Procurator. Xuantong In April 1910, Xu Qian was sent to Washington, D.C. in the United States together with Xu Shiying to participate in the eighth session of the Universal Conference on Reforming the Prison and Judicial System. Along the way, he visited London, Paris, Rome, Berlin, Moscow and other places to inspect the judicial systems of various countries. He returned to China in the spring of 1911.

=== Work under the Republic of China ===
After the establishment of the Republic of China, Xu Qian, Wu Tingfang, Wang Chonghui, Xu Shiying and others established National Progress Association in Shanghai. In April of the same year, he served as the Deputy Minister of Justice in the first Tang Shaoyi Cabinet of Yuan Shikai's Provisional Government. In June of the same year, when Yuan Shikai revised the law requiring presidential orders to be countersigned by the cabinet, Xu Qian joined the mass resignation led by Tang Shaoyi. In August, the National Co-Progress Association was jointly established with the Tongmenghui, the Kuomintang, and several other groups. Xu Qian was elected to its National Congress.

On March 20, 1913, the Kuomintang leader Song Jiaoren was assassinated. On April 27, Xu Qian published a famous article "Announcement to the People" in "Civil Rights Daily", calling on the people to fight against the president Yuan Shikai. After the failure of the second revolution, Xu Qian fled to Shanghai, practiced law, and sold characters. In the meantime, some Christian friends advised him to convert, Xu Qian replied: "If you have a good God, you should not allow people like Yuan Shikai to live in the world. If Yuan Shikai dies immediately, I will join [the Church]." Yuan Shikai died soon after, and Xu Qian fulfilled his promise and was baptised in the Anglican Church, taking the Christian name "George". Xu Qian claimed that he joined the Church to save the country. In 1917, Chinese Catholics and Protestants jointly founded the "Religious Freedom Association" with Xu Qian as the president in order to fight for the right of freedom of religious belief under the Chinese Constitution. In 1918, Xu Qian initiated the organization "Christian Salvation Congress" and was elected as an executive member.

=== Constitutional Protection Movement ===
In 1916, after Yuan Shikai died of illness, Li Yuanhong took over as the president. In September, Xu Qian was again appointed to serve as Deputy Minister of the Ministry of Justice in the first Duan Qirui Cabinet, with the secret task of liaising with the Kuomintang members in the Legislative Yuan. In July 1917, Sun Yat-sen launched the Constitutional Protection Movement, and Xu Qian went south to Guangzhou in July to serve as the secretary-general of Protection Military Government. In May 1918, the warlords of Guangxi forced Sun Yat-sen leave Guangzhou and seek exile in Shanghai. Xu Qian was the representative before leaving to attend the government affairs meeting of the military government of protecting France. Later, Xu Qian was appointed Minister of Justice by the law-protecting military government controlled by the Guangxi warlords.

In 1919, Xu Qian left Guangzhou to go to Shanghai to meet with Sun Yat-sen. On the eve of the Paris Peace Conference that ended the First World War, Sun Yat-sen sent Xu Qian and Chen Youren to attend as advisors. Xu Qian and others opposed the Conference's handling of the Shandong issue and opposed China's signing of the peace treaty. After Xu Qian returned to China, because he was dissatisfied with Cen Chunxuan's control of the French-protecting military government, he did not return to Guangzhou and went to Tianjin to serve as the editor-in-chief of the Catholic Yishibao.

In July 1920, on the eve of the outbreak of the Zhili–Anhui War, Feng Yuxiang led his troops from Changde to oppose the Beiyang government's policy of "unification by force", calling for federalism. Sun Yat-sen appointed Xu Qian and Niu Yongjian to meet Feng Yuxiang in Hankou, in order to convince Feng Yuxiang to defect from the Beijing government and participate in the national revolution. During the meeting, Xu Qian and Niu Yongjian introduced Sun Yat-sen's revolutionary ideas to Feng Yuxiang, and Feng Yuxiang agreed. From that point on, Xu Qian became the liaison between Sun Yat-sen and Feng Yuxiang, and he often visited Feng Yuxiang's army.

In late October 1920, the Gui Army suffered a disastrous defeat in the First Guangdong-Guangxi War. Cen Chunxuan, Lu Rongting, Lin Baoyi and others announced the withdrawal of the French Protector Army in the name of the fourth president. The Beiyang government unilaterally proclaimed "North-South reunification". Sun Yat-sen and others in Shanghai called for "North-South peace talks" and exposed the crimes of the French-protecting military government under the control of the Guangxi warlords. On November 25, Sun Yat-sen, together with Tang Shaoyi, Wu Tingfang and others, returned to Guangzhou from Shanghai to reorganize the French-protecting military government. On November 29, the French-protecting military government appointed Xu Qian as the Minister of Justice. In April 1921, the Guangzhou National Congress was held, and Sun Yat-sen was elected as the extraordinary president, and Xu Qian was elected as the president of the Dali Academy. In September 1922, Xu Qian served as the chief justice under Wang Chonghui's "cabinet of good men".

In February 1923, Sun Yat-sen returned to Guangzhou to organize the Grand Marshal Base Camp again. Xu Qian, Hu Hanmin, Sun Hongyi and others were dispatched by Sun Yat-sen to Shanghai and served as the Grand Marshal in Shanghai, participating in peace talks between the Kuomintang and the Beiyang government. While in Shanghai, Xu Qian founded the Shanghai University of Political Science and Law. After the failure of peace negotiations, Xu Qian returned to Guangzhou in 1923, serving as the director of the literature department at Lingnan University and founding the "Evaluation Daily".

=== First United Front ===
In January 1924, 1st National Congress of the Kuomintang was held in Guangzhou, approving the creation of the First United Front between the KMT and the Chinese Communist Party. Xu Qian actively endorsed this cooperation. In October 1924, Feng Yuxiang launched the Beijing coup, imprisoned the president Cao Kun, and invited Sun Yat-sen to go north with the Communist Party to discuss the state of country. In October 1924, Xu Qian was invited by Feng Yuxiang to Beijing to attend the state conference, and persuaded Feng Yuxiang, the "Christian general", with the idea of "Christian salvation". Because Feng Yuxiang married a Christian Li Dequan in 1924, he converted to Christianity and asked his soldiers to do likewise. Xu Qian also published a telegram in his own name, praising Feng Yuxiang for launching the Beijing coup as "a brave act of righteousness", advocating the dissolution of the illegal Yuan and holding a peace conference, stating that "The Abolished Emperor of the former Qing Dynasty is a criminal of the Republic of China, and should be governed by national laws.” Xuan was appointed by Feng Yuxiang as the director of the Russian Language School of Law and Politics, and the chairman of the Committee oversseing China's Boxer indemnity to Russia. At the same time, he also served as a member of the Beijing Branch of the Political Committee of the Kuomintang's Central Committee. During his time in Beijing, Xu Qian established contacts with Li Dazhao and other leaders of the Chinese Communist Party, Li Dazhao was then an executive member of the Central Committee of the Kuomintang, and in charge of the work of the Beijing Executive Department. Under the leadership of Li Dazhao, Xu Qian participated in the National Assembly Movement and the May 30th Movement in 1925.

In March 1925, Sun Yat-sen died of illness in Beijing. In July of that same year, the Guangzhou National Government was established, and Xu Qian elected to the Central Executive Committee as the member in charge of judicial administration. In January 1926, the 2nd National Congress of the Kuomintang was held in Guangzhou, and Xu Qian was elected as a member of the Central Executive Committee and a member of the Standing Committee. He is also a member of the National Government and Minister of Justice. Soon he was appointed director of the Beijing Executive Department of the Kuomintang. On March 7, 1926, the Sino-Russian University was established and Xu Qian became its director.

On March 18, 1926, Xu Qian, Li Dazhao, Zhao Shiyan and others initiated a "National Congress against the Eight-Power Ultimatum" in front of Tiananmen, and Xu Qian served as the chairman of the presidium of the Congress. Then the March 18 Massacre happened. After the tragedy, Xu Qian, Li Dazhao, Gu Mengyu and other 5 people were wanted by Duan Qirui's provisional government. Xu Qian fled to the Soviet embassy in Beijing, then secretly fled to the Soviet Union via Outer MongoliaKulun. At that time, Feng Yuxiang was forced to leave the army due to opposition from the Zhili Clique, and set off to study the Soviet Union. In Kulun, Xu Qian met Feng Yuxiang and convinced Feng Yuxiang to join the Kuomintang. In July, Xu Qian left Moscow and returned to Guangzhou via Europe. In August, he returned to Guangzhou and became a member of the Guangzhou National Government and Minister of Justice. In October, the Central Committee of the Chinese Kuomintang held a joint meeting of the Central Executive Supervisory Committee and representatives of the party departments of various provinces and districts in Guangzhou. Xu Qian attended the meeting as one of the five members of the presidium of the meeting, and discussed the National Government's platform and the strengthening of the central and local government matters.

=== Wuhan National Government ===
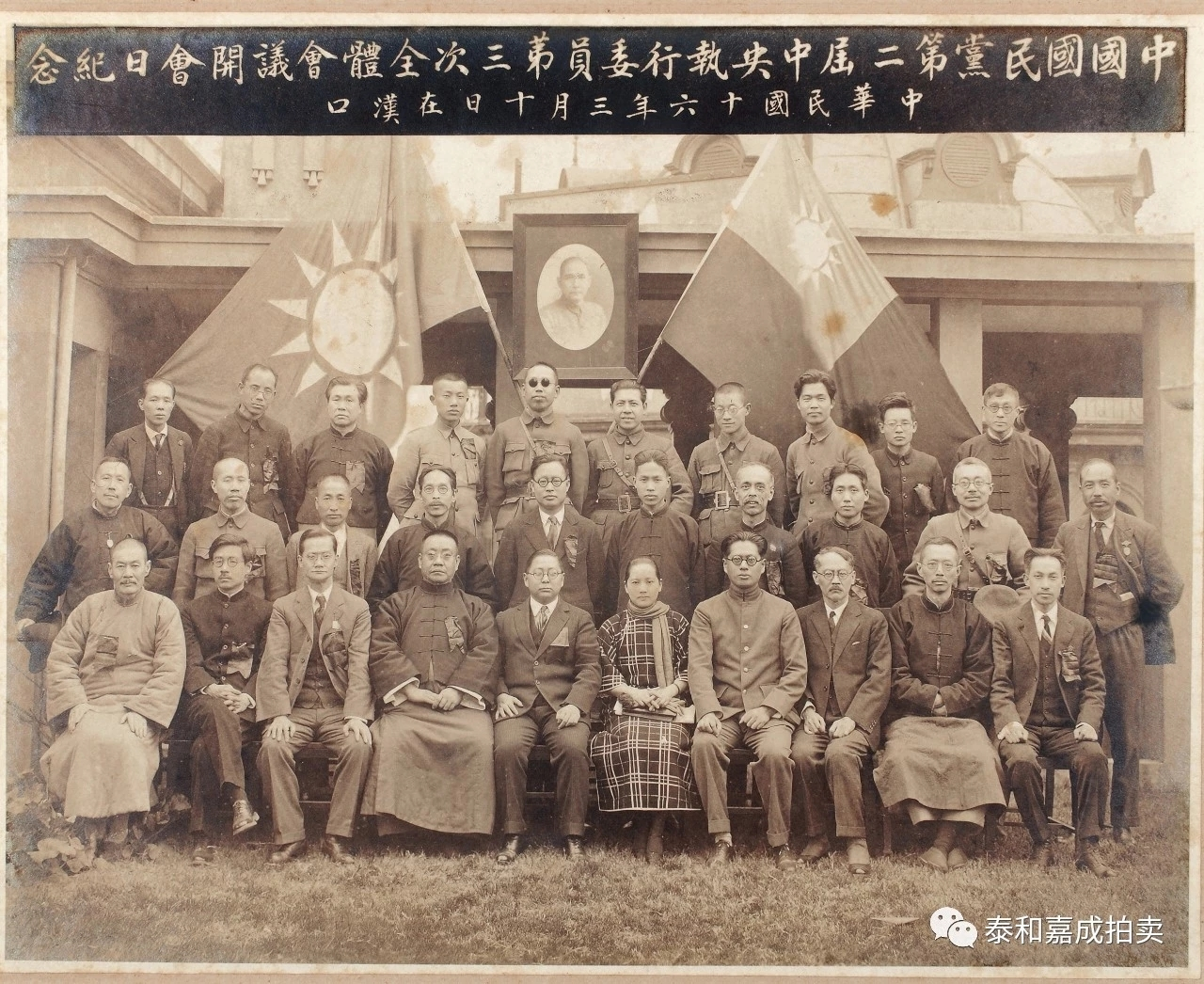
Group photo of representatives at the Third Plenary Session of the Second Central KMT Executive Committee. Xu is seated third from the left on the bottom row.

In December 1926, Xu Qian went to Wuhan to serve as the chairman of the Central Executive Committee there. In 1927, he was appointed as Government Affairs Commissioner and Director of the Department of Justice for Hubei. In February, he served as director of the National Wuchang Sun Yat-Sen University school committee.

On March 10, 1927, the Central Committee of the Kuomintang held a plenary session in Hankou where Xu Qian made a speech announcing the establishment of the Wuhan Nationalist Government. Thanks to the efforts of the Chinese Communist Party and the left wing of the Chinese Kuomintang, the meeting passed a resolution against Chiang Kai-shek's dictatorial control of the party, revoking Chiang's positions as chairman of the Central Standing Committee and chairman of the Military Commission. Xu Qian's opposition to Chiang Kai-shek's dictatorship was clear. At the meeting, he submitted proposals such as the "Proposal to Raise Party Power" and "To Oppose the Military Dictatorship and Establish a Military Commission". Xu Qian was elected as a member of the presidium, its Standing Committee, the Central Political Committee, the Military Commission, the Foreign Affairs Committee, the Finance Committee, and the Standing Committee of the National Government Committee. He served as director of the Military Tribunal of the Military Commission and as the school council member for the Whampoa Military Academy. During the Wuhan National Government, Xu Qian was one of the main leaders of the Central Committee of the Chinese Nationalist Party and the Wuhan National Government. He made important contributions to the implementation of the new judicial system and the recovery of the British concession in Hankou.

On April 2, Wu Zhihui, Zhang Jingjiang and others convened an emergency meeting of the Central Supervisory Committee of the Chinese Kuomintang in Shanghai, and passed a resolution to investigate the Communist party. Xu Qian was placed on a watch list for his involvement with the Wuhan government. On April 12, Chiang Jieshi launched the Shanghai Massacre, precipitating nationwide violence against the Communists. On June 1, the Wuhan Nationalist Government joined forces with Feng Yuxiang's National Army in Zhengzhou. From June 10 to 13, Wuhan leaders such as Wang Jingwei, Xu Qian, Sun Ke, and Ku Meng-yu came to Zhengzhou for a meeting with Feng Yuxiang. At the meeting, Wang Jingwei denounced Chiang Kai-shek's dictatorship, while Feng Yuxiang advocated mending the intra-party rift and continuing the Northern Expedition. They group decided to set up the Kaifeng branch of the Political Committee, with Feng Yuxiang as the chairman and Xu Qian as a member, responsible for the party affairs of the Kuomintang. Through this meeting, Feng Yuxiang monopolized the military and political power in Henan and Northwest China. This meeting also made preparations for a Wuhan Branch and the Ninghan Confluence.

On June 20, Xu Qian attended the Xuzhou Conference held by Chiang Kai-shek, Feng Yuxiang, Hu Hanmin, Wu Zhihui and others. This meeting was the beginning of a joint anti-Communist campaign in Ninghan. After that, Xu Qian stayed in Kaifeng and did not return to Wuhan on the grounds of preparing for the Kaifeng branch of the Political Committee and Henan Provincial University, so he did not participate in the July 15 Incident where Wang Jingwei expelled Communists from the Wuhan government. Soon, Wuhan leaders such as Wang Jingwei, Tan Yankai, and Sun Ke lost their allegiance to Chiang Kai-shek's Nanjing government, and formed a special committee for cooperation between Nanjing, Han and Shanghai. Xu Qian was not allowed to sit on the special committee on the grounds that he "favored the Communist Party". Later, the Central Supervisory Committee of the KMT listed Xu Qian as a "Communist partisan" and put him on the arrest list. Xu Qian was living in the Shanghai Concession, and publicly stated on November 17 that he would no longer participate in politics. Soon, Xu Qian moved to Kowloon and resumed his career as a lawyer. At its Fourth Plenary Session in February 1928, Xu Qian was suspended from the Central Committee.

== Later life ==
After the Mukden Incident in 1931, Xu Qian and Fang Dingying and others organized the "Anti-Japanese Federation" to promote unity and resistance to Japan, and delivered speeches against Chiang Kai-shek's inaction.

In November 1933, Xu Qian and Li Jishen and others went to Fujian from Hong Kong to participate in the Fujian revolt. On November 20, 1933, the generals Cai Tingkai, Jiang Guangnai and others, the 19th Route Army, and others, together with Li Jishen, Chen Mingshu and others, formed the Fujian People's Government, openly opposed Chiang Kai-shek, and signed the "Anti-Japanese and Anti-Chiang Preliminary Agreement" with the Chinese Communist Party. Xu Qian had helped planned this move in Hong Kong, and participated in the temporary Fuzhou people's congress. After the establishment of the Fujian People's Government, Xu was appointed as the President of the Supreme Court and the Chairman of the Agriculture and Workers' Happiness Committee. In January 1934, the Fujian People's Government collapsed, and Xu Qian returned to Hong Kong.

After the full outbreak of the Second Sino-Japanese War in 1937, Xu Qian returned to Nanjing to participate in anti-Japanese activities, and then went to Wuhan and Chongqing to serve as a member of the National Defense Commission. In 1939, he went to Hong Kong for medical treatment, where the next year he died on illness at the age of 69.

== Writing ==
- "General Principles of Civil Law"
- "Criminal Law Series"
- "Labor-Management Unity Theory"
- "Poetry"
- "Mr. Ji Long's Poems"
- "Mr. Xu Jilong's Posthumous Poems"
