= Wuhan government of the Republic of China =

1926–27 leftist Chinese government

Republic of China 中華民國
- 1926–1927
- Flag Emblem (Note: Before 17 December 1928, the Nationalists used the emblem of the Kuomintang.)

- Location of Wuhan within the Republic of China
- Capital: Wuhan
- Common languages: Chinese
- Demonym: Chinese
- Chairman
  - 1927: Wang Jingwei
- History
  - Established: 5 December 1926
  - Disestablished: 21 September 1927
Preceded by	Succeeded by
Nationalist government; National Pacification Army	Nationalist government

The Wuhan government (Note: also referred to as the Wuhan regime or Hankow government) (Chinese: 武漢政府) of the Republic of China (Chinese: 中華民國), was established by the left-wing of the Kuomintang in Wuhan following the capture of the city during the Northern Expedition. The government was eventually dissolved and reconciled with the Nanjing faction after the Kuomintang's purge of Chinese Communist Party members and the conclusion of the Nanjing–Wuhan split.

Following the capture of Wuhan during the Northern Expedition, the Nationalist government based in Guangzhou moved there in December 1926. In April 1927, after National Revolutionary Army (NRA) commander-in-chief Chiang Kai-shek purged communists and leftists in the Shanghai massacre, the Wuhan government split with Chiang in what is known as the "Nanjing–Wuhan split" (Chinese: 寧漢分裂). Chiang subsequently formed his own government in Nanjing. While Chiang continued the Northern Expedition on his own, increasing tensions between communists and the KMT in the Wuhan government resulted in a new purge of communists from that government, and an eventual reconciliation with the Nanjing faction, after which the government moved to Nanjing.

== History ==
=== Background ===
Despite Kuomintang founder Sun Yat-sen's policy of collaborating with the Chinese Communist Party (CCP) in the First United Front, a discrepancy existed between the two parties' ultimate goals for the revolution, and there had been constant conflict between them, such as the March 1926 Canton Coup. Joseph Stalin tried to persuade the small Communist Party to merge with the Kuomintang to bring about a bourgeois revolution before attempting to bring about a Soviet-style working class revolution. Stalin funded the KMT during the Northern Expedition to reunify China. Stalin said that NRA commander-in-chief Chiang Kai-shek was the only one capable of defeating the imperialists, and that his forces were to be squeezed for all usefulness like a lemon before being discarded.

During the expedition, labour movements led by the Communist Party endangered commercial interests' support of the KMT. Land reform incited further dissatisfaction among generals and soldiers in the National Revolutionary Army who came from landowning families. For example, the landholding family of General He Jian were paraded through the streets as criminals by communists.

=== Formation of the Wuhan government ===
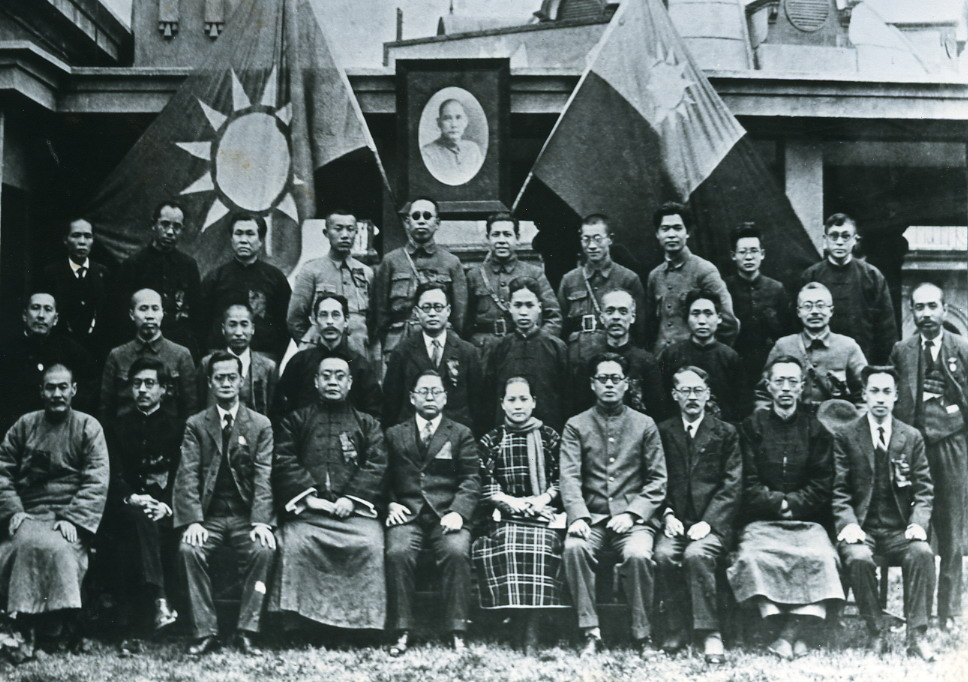
Third Plenary Session of the KMT Second Central Committee in Wuhan, March 1927

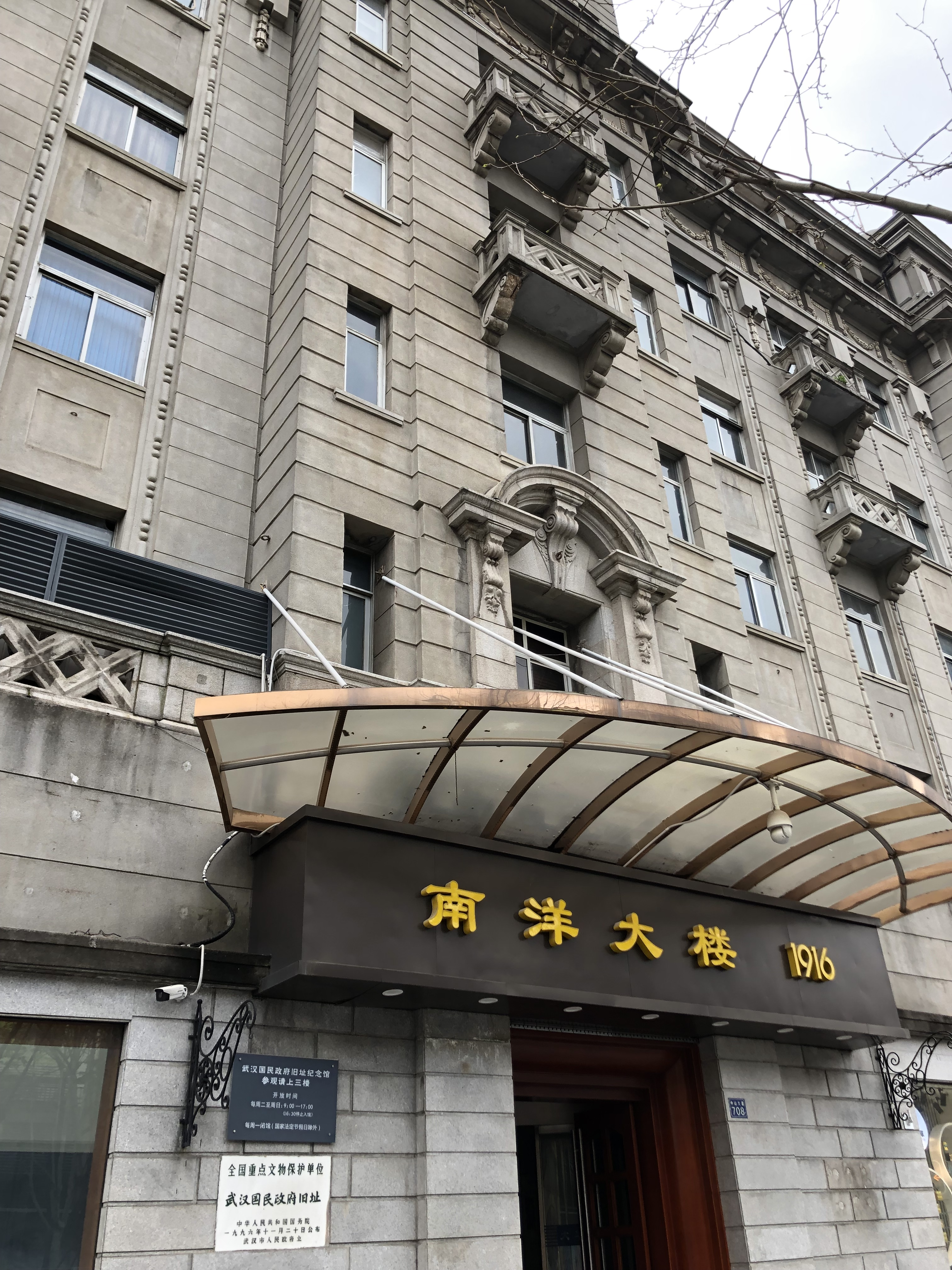
Wuhan Nationalist Government Office

The National Revolutionary Army, military arm of the KMT, captured the three cities of Wuchang, Hankou, and Hanyang in a series of battles from August to October 1926 during the early stage of the Northern Expedition, and merged their municipal governments to form Wuhan. After the Wuhan area had fallen to the KMT, local workers organized themselves into left-leaning trade unions, which grew to around 300,000 members by the end of the year. Trade unions also emerged in other NRA-held cities, while peasant uprisings spread throughout the countryside. Backed by these emerging mass-movements, members of the Kuomintang relocated from Guangzhou to Wuhan, and formed a new nationalist government in December. In order to consolidate the conquest, it was in the interest of the KMT to relocate from Guangzhou to Wuhan. Chiang initially invited the government to move to Wuhan but later demurred and tried to keep the members of the central committees in Nanchang, Jiangxi, where his headquarters was located. By the time the government moved to Wuhan with its left-leaning leadership including Sun Fo, Xu Qian, T. V. Soong, the peasant and labor movement led by communists and leftists of Kuomintang was in full swing in Hunan and Hubei. It was during this period that Mao Zedong prepared his Report on an Investigation of the Peasant Movement in Hunan that severely criticized Party leadership.

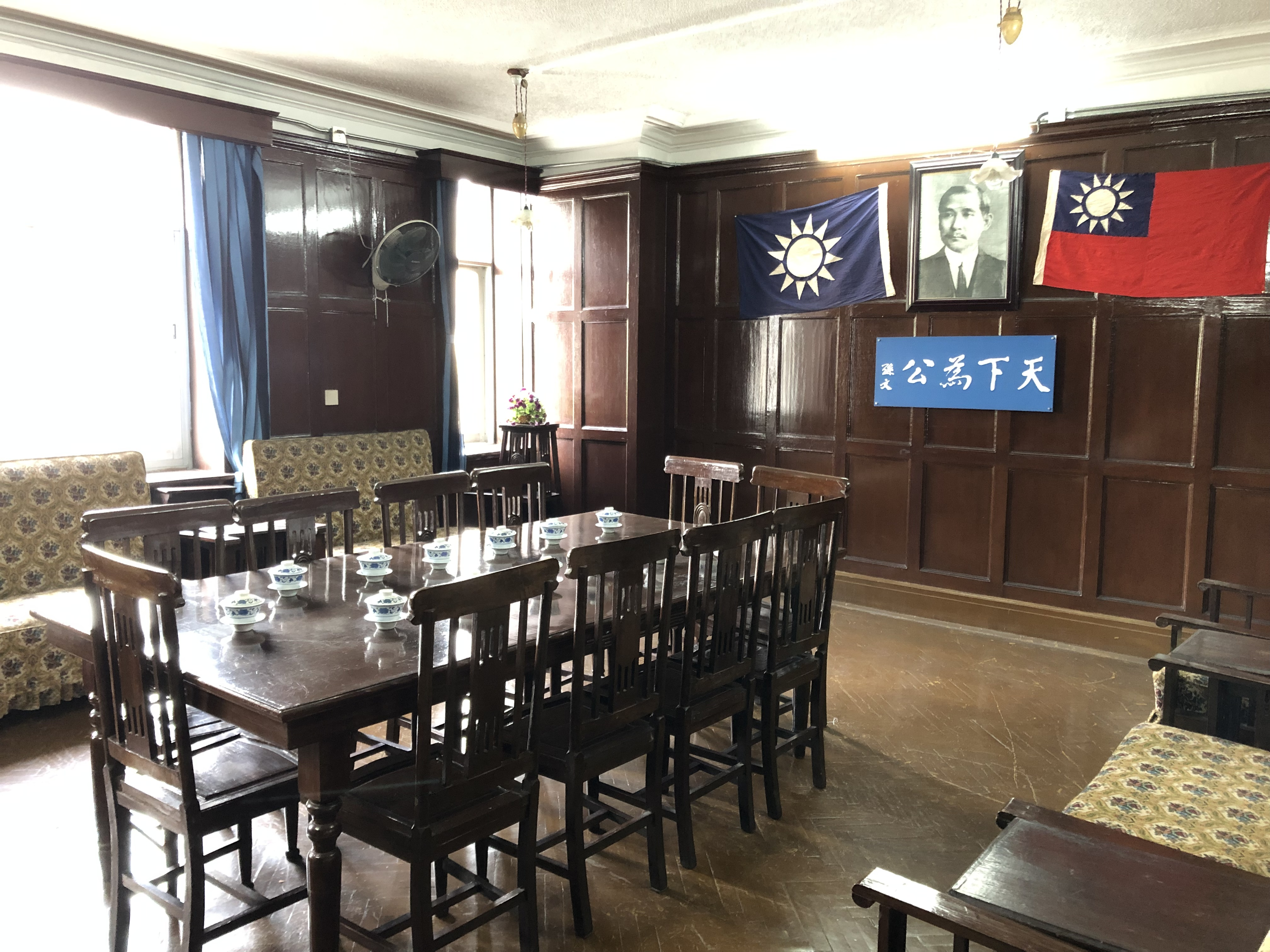
Former Meeting Room of the Nationalist Government

Chiang Kai-shek, who had been Commander-in-Chief of the KMT military since the Canton Coup in March 1926, opted to stay at his military headquarters in Nanchang. He did not want to become involved in the politics at Wuhan, instead preferring to focus on the conquest of the rest of China while maintaining his independence from other KMT leaders. In January 1927, violent protests broke out in the British concession at Hankou, resulting in its evacuation by the British and handover to the Chinese. Under such an atmosphere the leftists expanded control over the Kuomintang government in the Third Plenary Session of the Second Central Committee of Kuomintang. The party congress elected a majority of communists and leftists into the central committees, and therefore strengthened the Soviet hold on the party at the expense of Chiang Kai-shek. Areas under Wuhan's control, such as Changsha, were plastered with propaganda posters with slogans including: "Communism is the heart of China", "Foster the mother country of the proletariat — Soviet Russia", and "China and Russia are one". At the same time, Chiang was arresting communists as he advanced downstream the Yangtze River. It was widely suspected that the Chinese Communist Party and Soviet advisors in the Wuhan government used anti-imperialist and anti-foreign sentiments to instigate violent confrontations with foreign militaries in the Nanjing incident to strengthen the communists while simultaneously damaging the right-wing faction of the Kuomintang.

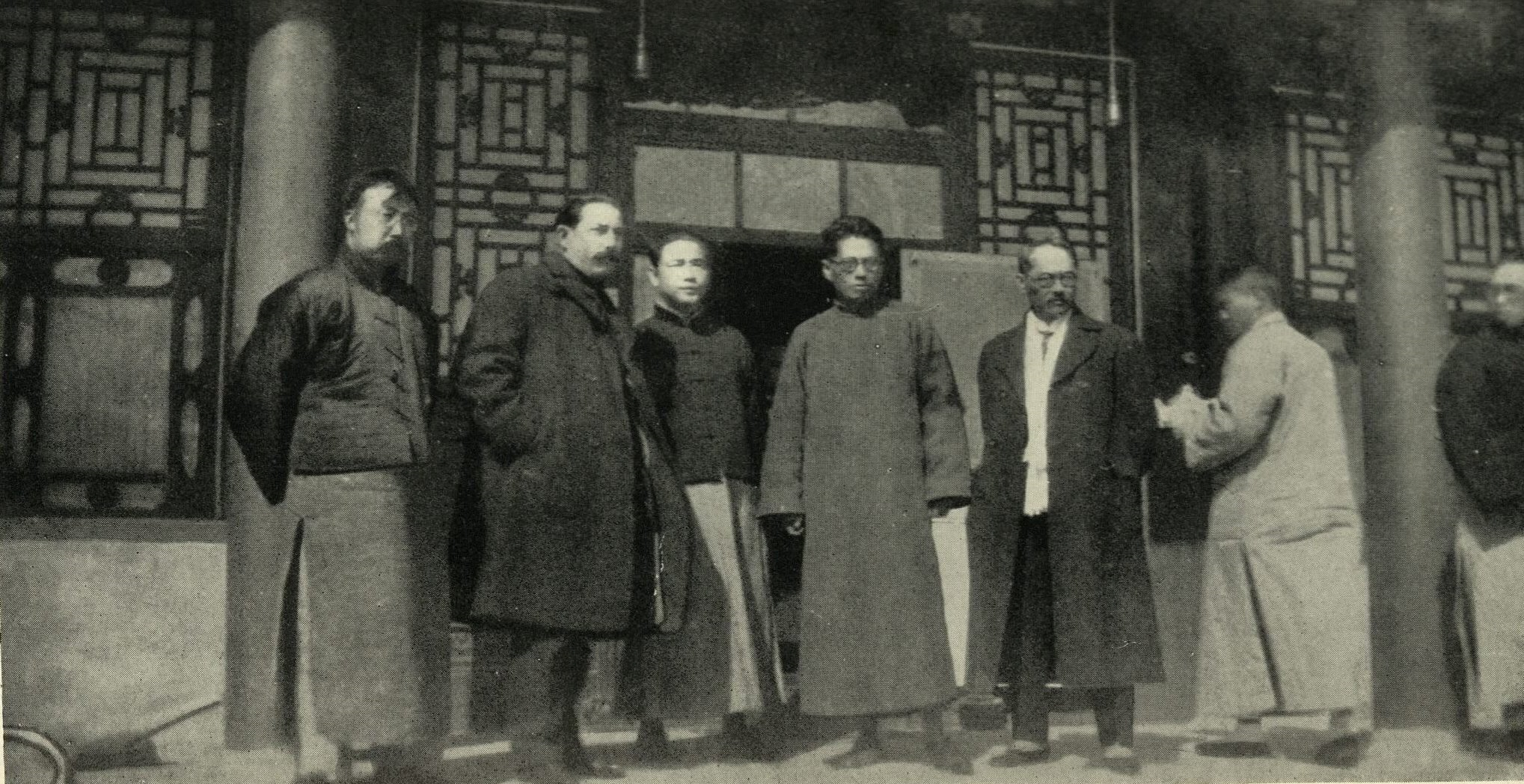
Leaders of Wuhan Nationalist government, from left to right: Mikhail Borodin (second from left), Wang Jingwei, T. V. Soong and Eugene Chen

It was under these circumstances that a divergence between the KMT and CCP appeared. KMT rightist figures like Chiang Kai-shek pushed for the "complete clearance of the Communist Party". Meanwhile, KMT leftists, CCP and the Communist International were alarmed and decided to support the leftist leader Wang Jingwei who previously had been exiled abroad. The Wuhan government, which was dominated by leftist KMT politicians from the beginning, aided by the Chinese Communist Party, as well as widespread grassroots support, transformed Wuhan into "a seedbed for revolution", while portraying themselves as the sole legitimate leadership of the KMT. Controlling much of Hunan, Hubei, Guangdong and Jiangxi, the Wuhan government began challenging Chiang's authority, and launched a propaganda campaign against him from January 1927. On 10 March, the Wuhan leadership nominally stripped Chiang of much of his military authority, though refrained from deposing him as commander-in-chief. At the same time, the Communist Party became an equal partner in the Wuhan government, sharing power with the KMT leftists. In response to these developments, Chiang started to rally anti-communist elements in the KMT and NRA around him.

Meanwhile, the Wuhan government began to face severe administrative problems. While the grassroots movements had originally been among its most important supporters, their actions sowed social instability and economic chaos in the areas under its control. They drove out foreigners, including several economically important firms, and suppressed middle and small merchants. Although the Wuhan government was reluctant to alienate the communist-leaning workers, they could hardly tolerate the ongoing social trend, as they were beginning to create severe financial downturn. By May 1927, the Wuhan government had an expenditure of 10 million Chinese dollars in contrast to a revenue of just 1.8 million dollars. Inflation and mass layoffs further worsened the economic situation. Furthermore, the countryside began to descend into chaos, as peasant rebels took control of large swaths of land. The communists generally claimed that the rural insurgents were under their control, but in reality these insurgents were often independent groups or simply found themselves allied with the leftists. Regardless of the political position of the peasants, the Wuhan government tried to sway them to their side through a reform program, although the planned agrarian reform never really took off. Instead, the rural insurgents started to govern themselves, which in response alienated much of the NRA officials as the Kuomintang military leadership were generally opposed to peasant self-rule.

In addition to peasants' organizations, United Front campaigners also helped found a number of women's associations. In Henan and Hubei dozens of women's associations were established as branches of county peasant associations. At a conference in Wuhan on International Women's Day, 1927, female revolutionaries laid out the goals of the women's movement. They demanded an end to foot-binding, increased female literacy, job opportunities for women, and an end to the patriarchal family structure. This last demand included women's right to get married and divorced as she chose, as well as bans on polygamy, concubinage, and child marriages. Most of these demands were granted by the Wuhan Nationalist government. Conference attendees from the countryside brought the message home, leading to some changes in the treatment of women there as well as in the cities.

=== Nanjing–Wuhan split ===
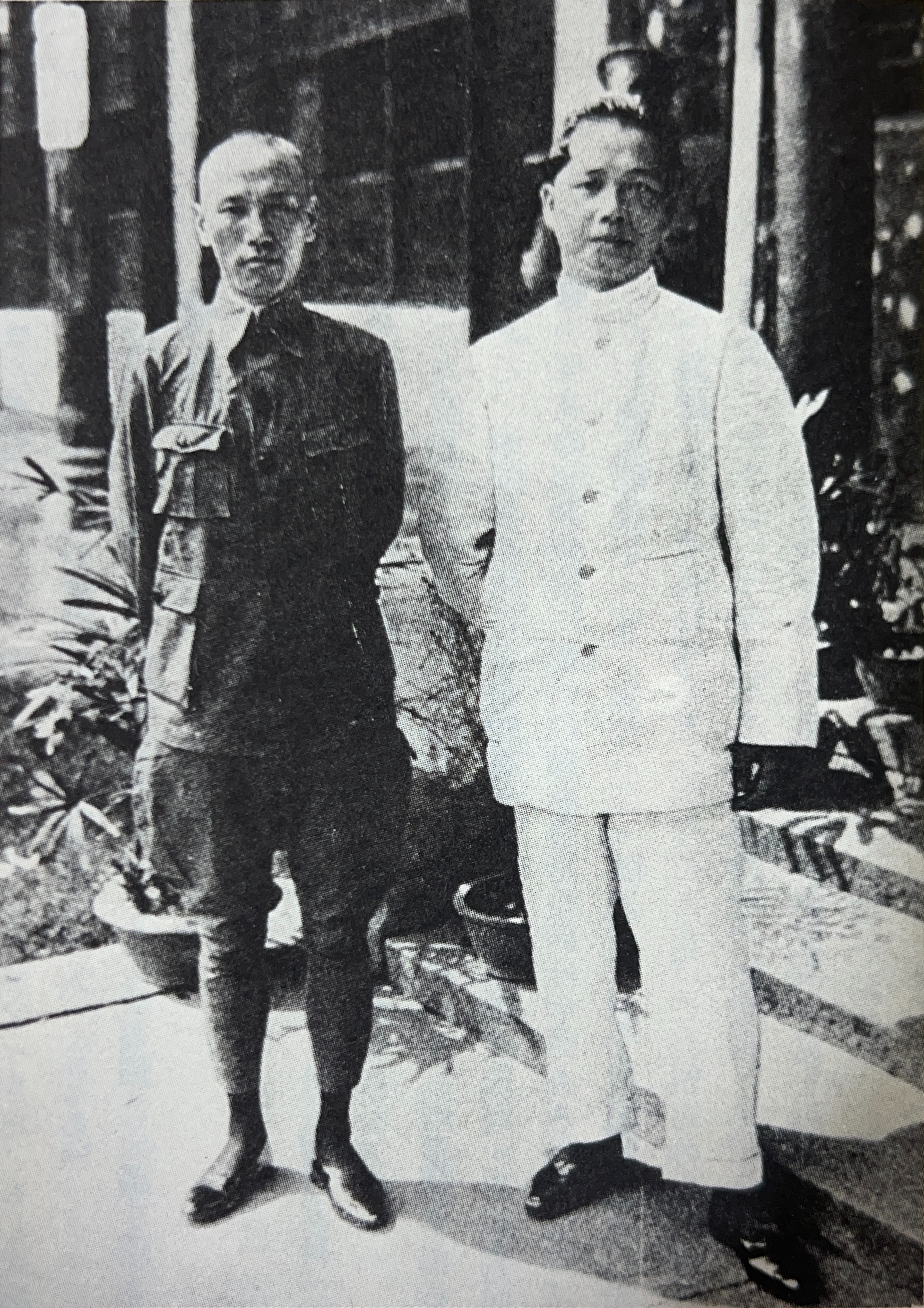
Chiang Kai-Shek and Wang Jingwei in 1927

On 1 April 1927, Wang Jingwei returned to China, and arrived at Shanghai, which had been occupied by the National Revolutionary Army. Chiang Kai-shek and Li Zongren met with him to urge him to end the collaborative relations with the CCP as the president of the Wuhan government, but Wang stated that he would "pick up side with the workers and farmers", and proposed to tolerate the communists for the time being. Concurrently, violence broke out in Hankou, part of Wuhan, when trade unionists and communist agitators attacked the Japanese concession there, sparking the "Hankou incident". Wuhan garrison commander Tang Shengzhi and foreign minister Eugene Chen rushed to quell the disorder and assuage the Japanese. At a KMT senior officials' meeting in Shanghai on the following day, Wu Zhihui went so far as to kneel down and beg for Wang's assent to Chiang's proposals. The meeting only managed to proceed with Chiang Kai-shek's and others' mediation. In the fourth Plenary Session of the 2nd KMT Central Committee held in Nanjing, a consensus was reached on how to resolve the KMT-CCP dispute:

Consent to Wang Jingwei's proposal of temporary tolerance of the Communist Party. The fourth plenary session will come up with a plan to settle the dispute. Before this session, the following actions proposed by Chiang Kai-shek will be carried out to solve any emergency:

- First, inform communist leader Chen Duxiu to notify communists in KMT-controlled areas to halt their activities before the pending meeting.
- Second, since the government had come under the control of the Communist Party after moving to Hubei and some unsound commands have been made, should these damage the party's prospects, they can be ignored until the party's fourth plenary session.
- Third, the army should order senior officials to suppress Communist Party organizations and groups that are causing disturbances.
- Workers' pickets and other armed groups should obey the Commander-in-Chief (Chiang), and those who do not comply will be labeled as counter-revolutionary and banned.

However, on 5 April, Wang decided to take the initiative by privately publishing with Chen Duxiu the "Joint Declaration of the Leaders of the Nationalist and Communist Parties", in which he proclaimed a permanent collaboration between the two parties. This declaration drove the anti-communist KMT officials into a rage. Wu Zhihui, who had previously knelt down to beg Wang, mocked him as paternalistic, "the parent of the KMT". Wang left Shanghai that night for Wuhan, the government there being made up mostly of the communists and the KMT left-wing.

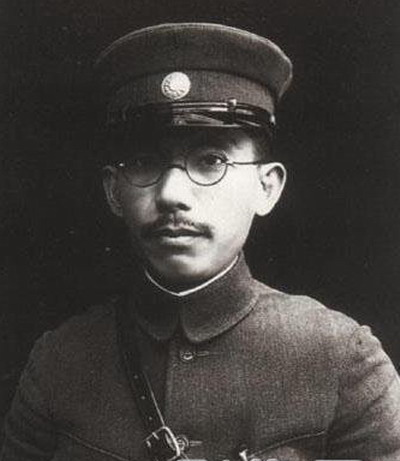
Tang Shengzhi, leader of the Wuhan Army

Wang Jingwei arrived at Wuhan on 10 April and met Tang Shengzhi and Tan Yankai, nominally to call together members of central committee to attend the fourth plenary session of the 2nd KMT Central Committee held in Nanjing. He thought that the meeting would be held as planned, but unexpectedly, Chiang Kai-shek rallied the anti-communist factions of Hu Hanmin and Li Jishen to "exterminate the communists" on 12 April, and formed a rival government in Nanjing (Chinese: 南京国民政府). Incensed and shocked, Wang declared that Chiang had been "expelled from the party and dismissed from all his posts", namely, the KMT central executive membership. The Wuhan government responded by accusing Chiang and his followers of being the puppets of foreign imperialists and criticised his close cooperation with Shanghai's merchant class, arguing that he helped to oppress workers and peasants. On 18 April, the same day of the formation of the Nanjing government, during a public rally in Wuhan, Wang delivered a speech in which he severely condemned Chiang Kai-shek. The Nanjing and Wuhan governments were thus officially split.

To prevent the Wuhan government from sending forces against the Nanjing government, Guangxi warlord Li Zongren and his subordinate Ying Yuhan went to Jiangxi and Wuhan respectively, to lobby Wang and other armed forces in Wuhan. They managed to convince both sides to continue the Northern Expedition in mutual non-interference, and on the 19th the Wuhan government appointed Hunan warlord Tang Shengzhi as Commander-in-chief to proceed with the Northern expedition. On 1 May, Chiang Kai Shek also continued with the Northern Expedition independently.

By this point, however, the anti-communist sentiment in the NRA had grown significantly as result of internal tensions in Wuhan-controlled areas as well as agitation by the Nanjing faction. As result, the NRA's 14th Division under Xia Douyin rebelled in western Henan and marched against Wuhan in May, supported by Sichuan warlord Yang Shen. Though Xia was defeated by Wuhan loyalist Ye Ting's 24th Division and Yang's attack was repelled, the open rebellion further undermined the confidence of political and military leaders in the KMT toward the Wuhan leadership.

=== The "May Instructions" ===
On 1 June, Communist International (Comintern) representatives Mikhail Borodin and M. N. Roy received a secret telegram from Joseph Stalin with orders for the Wuhan government, which later became known as the "May Instructions". Without consulting Borodin or anyone else, Roy revealed the contents of the message to Wang Jingwei. The instructions presented the following demands:

- Insistence that every effort be made for land to be occupied by the Communist Party. However, actions that are too aggressive should be avoided, and officials and soldiers' lands should be exempted. Make concessions to artisans, merchants and small landlords.
- Mobilize 20,000 communists and 50,000 revolutionary workers and farmers to raise an army.
- Recruit new leaders from the workers and farmers of the lower stratum to join KMT so as to alter the composition of the party. Expel all those of "old mindsets".
- Establish a revolutionary military court headed by well-known party officials and non-communists, to punish reactionary officials.

Wang Jingwei believed that if these instructions were followed the KMT might be destroyed, but continued negotiations with the Soviets. He requested that the Soviet Union provide 15 million roubles in aid, but Moscow offered only 2 million. Later, Wang vented his frustration to chief Soviet adviser to the KMT Borodin, and considered sending him back to the Soviet Union.

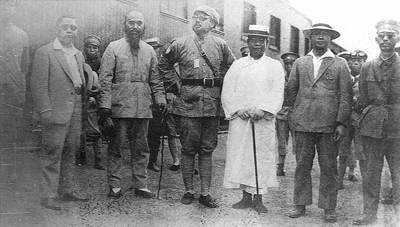
The Wuhan government meeting with Feng Yuxiang, June 1927

The "May Instructions" compelled Wang to diverge from the communists, but did nothing to quell his dislike for Chiang. In an effort to counter both the CCP and Chiang's Nanjing faction simultaneously, Wang sought the backing of Guominjun leader Feng Yuxiang, who controlled large parts of northern China. Without informing the CCP, he sent Deng Yanda to meet with Feng at Zhengzhou on 8–10 June. In the meeting, though Wang had offered Feng all possible concessions, Feng still insisted that Wang take the lead in parting from the communists. Given that Wuhan military commander-in-chief Tang Shengzhi had been badly wounded in a battle with warlord Zhang Zuolin in Henan province, hampering Wuhan's ability to defend itself, and that Feng had taken that opportunity to seize control of Henan, Wang Jingwei had to do as he requested, lest Wuhan be subject to an attack by Feng's forces.

Unbeknownst to Wang Jingwei, Feng Yuxiang had dispatched Li Mingzhong to get in touch with Chiang Kai-shek, and managed to meet him in Xuzhou on 19 June. Compared to the nominal titles that Wang had offered, Chiang agreed to provide Feng with 2.5 million yuan monthly from July 1927 to cover military expenditures, and did not demand that he sever ties with the Wuhan government. Feng was immensely satisfied, and said that he wished he could have met Chiang earlier. After the meeting, Feng wired a message to Wuhan in the name of both himself and Chiang, and demanded that the Wuhan government expel Soviet representative Mikhail Borodin, carry out a purge of communists within the party and finish the Northern Expedition, which forced Wuhan into an even weaker position.

Views on the "May Instructions" varied within the Chinese Communist Party. When Chen Duxiu first read it he thought it did not fit into China's reality, and telegraphed back indicating that it was hard to be enforced. This, however, dissatisfied the Communist Party of Soviet Union and the Comintern. "Article 11 on the KMT–CPC Union" had been passed by the expanded Central Committee on 30 June, and it suggested that the communists should consider breaking ties with the Wuhan government.

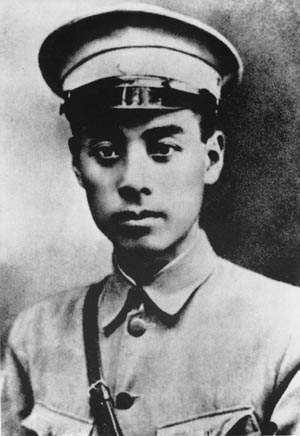
Zhou Enlai in KMT military uniform

On 4 July, the CCP held an expanded political bureau meeting on San Jiao Jie street, Hankou, Wuhan. General secretary Chen Duxiu and Borodin insisted that the instructions not be followed for the time being, but this was opposed by radical elements in the party. Apart from this, the two leaders decreed that the workers and farmers' movements in Hunan and Hubei be put on hold so as to rescue the united front with the KMT left wing. However, the Comintern deemed that by pausing workers and farmers' movements to maintain KMT membership status Chen and Borodin were guilty of "opportunism" and recalled Borodin to Russia immediately. On 8 July, the Comintern requested that all communists withdraw from KMT. On 12 July, Chen Duxiu's was dismissed as CCP general secretary, and a leaders' group constituting Zhou Enlai, Li Lisan, Li Weihan, Zhang Tailei and Zhang Guotao was formed (Qu Qiubai later joined them). Researcher Zhang Yufa speculates that the Comintern's intention was for an armed insurrection to seize leadership of revolutionary movements from the KMT. On 13 July, CCP issued a declaration that it would officially withdraw from the KMT, and reproached Wang as "openly sponsoring counter-revolutionaries".

=== Break with CCP and dissolution ===
Continuous unrest by trade unionists and communist-aligned peasant movements, along with Soviet interference in Wuhan's affairs, placed constant pressure on the Wuhan government, which subsequently moved to purge communists from its ranks on 15 July 1927, in what is known as the "715 Incident". In response to the purge, the Chinese Communist Party initiated the Nanchang uprising against the Wuhan government on 1 August 1927, after which Wuhan agreed to reunify with the Nanjing nationalist government. In return for his cooperation, Wang Jingwei demanded that Chiang resign from his post of commander-in-chief, and relinquish all political titles. Chiang accordingly resigned from his post on 12 August. On 21 September, the Wuhan Political Council made an official statement to the effect that they would relocate to Nanjing, ending the Wuhan government.

== Military forces ==
Though most of the NRA was loyal to Chiang Kai-shek or various warlords who joined the KMT before or during the Northern Expedition, the Wuhan government commanded its own military force. The so-called "Wuhan Army" was less strong and well-armed than the rest of the NRA, and suffered from the defection of right-leaning commanders and their troops to Chiang's side.

Commanded by Tang Shengzhi, the Wuhan army was too weak in numbers and equipment to truly rival Chiang's followers or to defeat the northern warlords. Nevertheless, a 70,000-strong army loyal to the Wuhan government launched its own "Northern Expedition" in April 1927, aiming to conquer Henan from the northern warlords. Though lacking in arms, this force was joined by deserters from Wu Peifu's forces and managed to push back the warlord Zhang Xueliang, but suffered 14,000 casualties while doing so, and was forced to return to Wuhan. Unable to sufficiently replenish its numbers, the Wuhan army was eventually defeated by Chiang-loyal NRA forces.

== See also ==
- Reorganization Group
