= Hankou Incident =

1927 riot in a Japanese concession in China

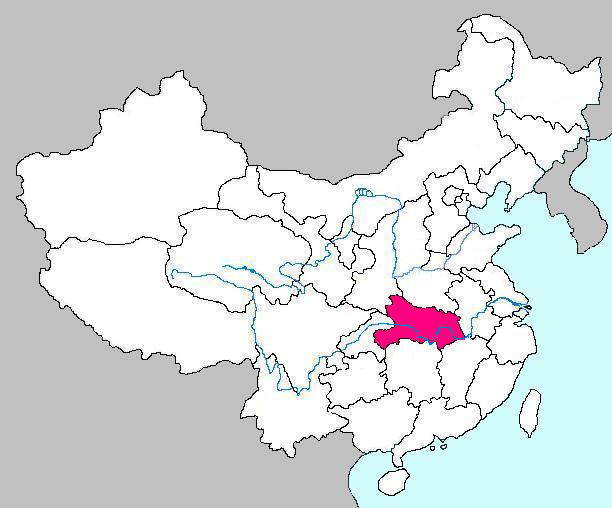
Hubei, the province in which Hankou (now part of the city of Wuhan) was located

The Hankou Incident (also rendered as Hankow Incident; Chinese and Japanese: 漢口事件 (Hankō Jiken or Kankō Jiken)) was an incident that occurred on 3 April 1927 in which rioters and a few military units entered the Japanese concession in the Chinese city of Hankou, engaged in vandalism and looting, and attacked Japanese residents and consular staff. A number of servicemen of the Imperial Japanese Navy were injured, 150 homes were damaged and the total cost of the destruction was estimated at 920,000 yen. Dozens of Chinese civilians were also killed when Japanese marines fired machine guns at protestors. Although some reports suggest that the incident occurred at the instigation of the Chinese Communist Party, the riots were sparked by an altercation between Japanese marines and Chinese workers.

== Background of the incident ==
Since about February, Chinese people started to uproot and run off with trees and hedges from the mansions of wealthy people and from the Chinese gardens near the Japanese publishing company Doubunshoin just outside the Japanese concession. Before long this spread to Japanese homes. The perpetrators were mainly women and children but later adult men also turned out and hacked down the trees with axes in broad daylight.

Then, when the Nanking Incident happened on 24 March 1927 the Chinese spread exaggerated rumors about rapes of Japanese residents and they ominously suggested that if something like that happened in Hankou, they would first target young women.

Several days before the incident, Tang Shengzhi ordered the evacuation of American and British residents but he advised Japanese authorities that their residents could remain as they had sufficient protection.

== Outbreak of the riots ==
There is some debate as to how the riots began. According to one source they were sparked by a physical altercation between a Japanese marine and a local ricksha puller, in which the latter was seriously injured. When a coolie attempted to come to the assistance of the ricksha puller, the marine stabbed him through the heart with his sword. Rather than disciplining the marine for his conduct, the Japanese naval commander ordered a detachment of troops to fire machine guns at a crowd of protestors who had gathered around the concession. The conflict between Japanese troops and Chinese protestors eventually led to dozens of fatalities. According to Japanese reports little after 3:00 PM on 3 April Chinese children threw stones at two sailors who were passing by Tsumazuru, a luxury restaurant on Xiechang Road in the Japanese concession in Hankou. In the ensuing verbal altercation, about 30 Chinese turned upon the sailors and then a group of rickshaw pullers surrounded them and started to beat them. The sailors knocked over one of the rickshaw men and took refuge in the nearby restaurant Yamayoshi. Immediately Chinese onlookers entered the fray and both Yamayoshi and a neighbouring restaurant, the Naniwa Buffet, were utterly destroyed. To make matters worse, false rumors were spread that Japanese sailors had killed Chinese and that a rickshaw man had been stabbed with a knife. Just then, near Pinghe Street on the northern side of the Japanese concession, a group of Chinese who were taking part in the celebratory procession of an organizational meeting of the farmers’ association instead stormed the Japanese concession, two thirds of which was engulfed by the mob. When they saw Japanese people, they surrounded them and beat them, and Japanese businesses were attacked one by one. The attacks of these rioters were undertaken in a thorough and precise manner. The vice-consul Tanaka rushed to the scene when he heard about the disturbances but although he called out to the crowd that he was a consul, he was still assaulted. At the house of a certain Mr. Tamura near the barbershop at the corner of Nanxiao Road and Pinghe Street the mob found his wife, who was lying in a sickbed shortly after giving birth, and kicked her to death before abandoning her corpse where they killed her.

At about 4:00 PM, a crowd of several thousand flying the red flag with children in the lead had assembled but when at the behest of their leaders they let out a shout and tried to descend on the riverfront, a Japanese naval landing force came ashore and firstly shot blanks but then fired off several live rounds. The rioters then retreated and surged like an avalanche out of the concession, plundering all the way. Though the rioters stubbornly refused to move out once they had reached Pinghe Street, when the Japanese landing party was compelled to fire off warning shots with their machine guns in the direction of the Honganji temple's embankment the crowd fled. The crowd which was thus driven from the Japanese concession attacked Japanese businesses located in the concessions of other countries. They attacked a restaurant where six sailors were dining, beat them mercilessly, and then carried them away and imprisoned them at the headquarters of the communist-controlled All-China Federation of Trade Unions. That night, 25 Japanese people escaped to the British ship HMS Bee and were protected. Dojin Hospital also pulled out from Hankou.

Tang Shengzhi dispatched his army on the morning of 4 April and took charge of the situation but the All-China Federation of Trade Unions said that they could not agree to release their hostages without getting favorable terms for them from the Japanese, and even when Tang Shengzhi tried to send them back the jiuchadui, armed communist picketers who were spying on Tang's garrison headquarters, obstructed him. Due to the deliberations of the Japanese consul general, they were finally returned on 7 April.

On the night of the incident Eugene Chen, the foreign minister of China, hurried to Consul General Takao and expressed his regrets and said that China would take full responsibility to resolve the issue. Wuhan garrison commander Tang Shengzhi also came and expressed his regrets, and requested the withdrawal of the Japanese landing party since his army was now guarding the concession. The consul general respected China's show of good faith and sought the evacuation of the landing party. Because it seemed that the Chinese were showing their sincerity by stationing their army in the area surrounding the concession, keeping away the crowds with the cooperation of the jiuchadui, and putting up posters exhorting citizens to not loot or harm the Japanese, the landing party for a time returned to its base at Taisho Hall. However, the Chinese army itself engaged in looting and immediately the Japanese redeployed their landing force. Tang Shengzhi's army which had entered Honganji was accused of looting the inner temple and was replaced by the army of He Jian, whose forces in turn withdrew from Honganji at the insistence of the Japanese landing party.

Representatives of the All-China Federation of Trade Unions said that 10 Chinese people had died during the incident and denounced the use of force by the Japanese landing party as illegal. They continued to trot out uncooperative demands for immediate withdrawal of the landing party and an investigation of the causes of the incident, but were brushed off by the consul general. At the same time the Federation tried to enforce a blockade on food supplies into the Japanese concession.

On 6 April 1:20 pm, women and children evacuated aboard the Joyo-maru and Daifuku-maru. Afterwards more were evacuated in several trips. The over 2,100 Japanese residents were reduced to upwards of 500.

== Other repercussions ==
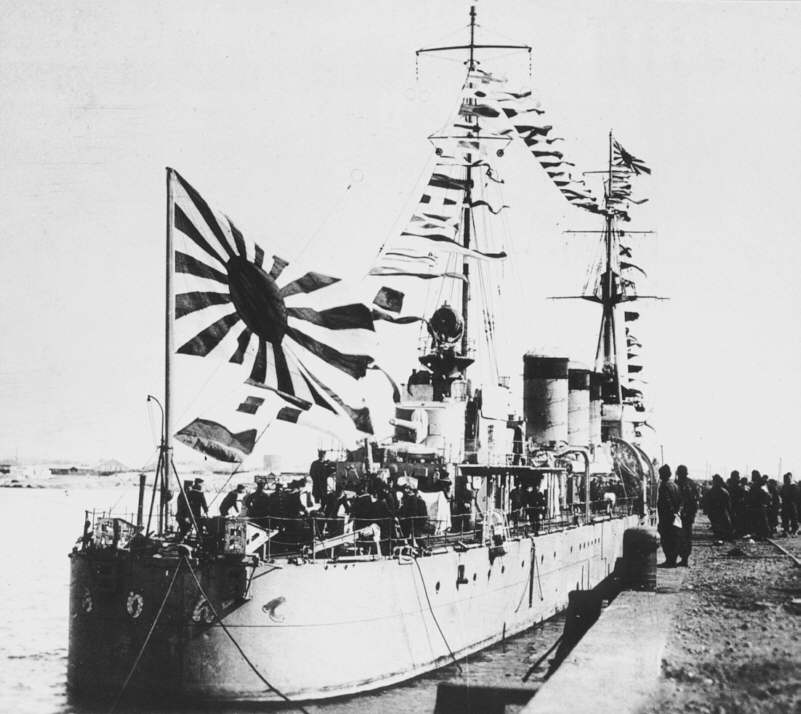
Tenryu was sent from Shanghai to Wuhan loaded with food supplies. The 18th Destroyer Group, consisting of Isokaze class destroyers Amatsukaze, Isokaze, and Tokitsukaze were also deployed.

On April 3, Standard Oil decided to close up operations in Yichang and withdrew all its US employees on American and British ships. America's envoy recommended that Americans resident in Beijing leave the capital. On 12 April, Chiang Kai-shek carried out the Shanghai massacre, executing many leading members of the Chinese Communist Party who were regarded with suspicion by the great powers who were willing to support Chiang's regime.

== Bibliography ==
Ryuji Hattori, Ed.『満州事件と重光駐華公使報告書』

Hideo Tanaka, Ed.『もうひとつの南京事件』

Takeo Hibio『世界史年表第4版』河出書房出版、1997年、page 189

Yuan-tsung Chen Return to the Middle Kingdom: One Family, Three Revolutionaries, and the Birth of Modern China, Union Square Press, New York pp241–242
