= Premier Xu =

Premier Xu may refer to:

- Xu Shichang (1855–1939), president and premier of the Republic of China
- Xu Shiying (1873–1964), premier of the Republic of China
