= Shanghai massacre =

Massacre on 12 April 1927

- Part of the Chinese White Terror
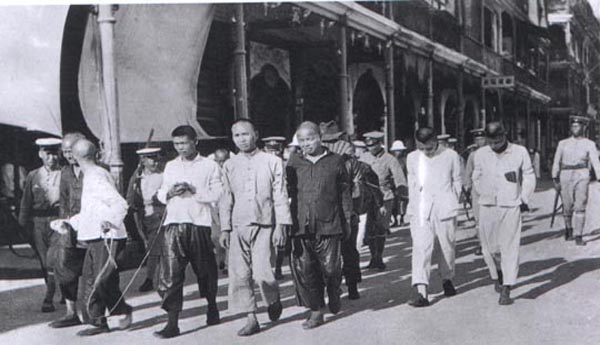
- Communists being rounded up during the purges
Date	12 – 15 April 1927
Location	Shanghai, China
Result	End of the First United Front; Start of the Chinese Civil War in the Nanchang Uprising

Belligerents
Republic of China: Kuomintang; Green Gang; Ghadar Party	Chinese Communist Party; Left Kuomintang

Commanders and leaders
Chiang Kai-shek (NRA commander-in-chief); Bai Chongxi (NRA commander in Shanghai); Du Yuesheng (Green Gang leader)	Chen Duxiu (CCP general secretary); Zhou Enlai; Chen Yannian (executed); Zhao Shiyan (executed); Sun Bingwen (executed); Luo Yinong (executed); Wang Shouhua (executed); Xuan Zhonghua (executed)

Units involved
(Taiwan) National Revolutionary Army; Green Gang and other Shanghai gangs	Chinese Communist Party; Kuomintang leftists; Shanghai labor union militias

Strength
Approx. 5,000 soldiers of the 2nd Division of the 26th Army and members of various gangs	Thousands from labor union militias

Casualties and losses
Very low	5,000–10,000 killed
- / ~ 10,000 Left Kuomintang's killed (executed)
- CCP was largely diminished

Shanghai massacre
- Chinese: 四一二事件
Transcriptions

Alternative name
- Traditional Chinese: 四一二清黨
- Simplified Chinese: 四一二清党
Transcriptions

Alternative name (2)
- Traditional Chinese: 東南清黨
- Simplified Chinese: 东南清党
Transcriptions

Alternative name (3)
- Traditional Chinese: 四一二反革命政變
- Simplified Chinese: 四一二反革命政变
Transcriptions

Alternative name (4)
- Traditional Chinese: 四一二慘案
- Simplified Chinese: 四一二惨案
Transcriptions

The Shanghai massacre of 12 April 1927, the April 12 Purge or the April 12 Incident as it is commonly known in China, was the violent suppression of Chinese Communist Party (CCP) organizations and leftist elements in Shanghai by forces supporting General Chiang Kai-shek and conservative factions in the Kuomintang (Chinese Nationalist Party or KMT). The event began the campaign of anti-communist repression in Nationalist China.

Following the incident, conservative KMT elements carried out a full-scale purge of communists in all areas under their control, and violent suppression occurred in Guangzhou and Changsha. The purge led to an open split between left-wing and right-wing factions in the KMT, with Chiang Kai-shek establishing himself as the leader of the right-wing faction based in Nanjing, in opposition to the original left-wing KMT government based in Wuhan, which was led by Wang Jingwei.

By 15 July 1927, the Wuhan regime had expelled the CCP from its ranks, effectively ending the First United Front, a working alliance between the KMT and the CCP under the tutelage of Communist International (Comintern) agents. For the rest of 1927, the CCP would fight to regain power, beginning the Autumn Harvest Uprising and culminating with the Nanchang Uprising, nominally commencing the Chinese Civil War. With the failure and the crushing of the Guangzhou Uprising however, the power of the CCP was largely diminished, unable to launch another major urban offensive for years.

== Names ==
In KMT historiography, the event is occasionally referred to as the April 12 Purge (simplified Chinese: 四一二清党; traditional Chinese: 四一二清黨; pinyin: Sìyī'èr Qīng Dǎng; Wade–Giles: Ssu⁴-i¹-erh⁴ Ch'ing¹ Tang³), while Communist historiography refers to the event as either the April 12 Counter-revolutionary Coup (simplified Chinese: 四一二反革命政变; traditional Chinese: 四一二反革命政變; pinyin: Sìyī'èr Fǎngémìng Zhèngbiàn; Wade–Giles: Ssu⁴-i¹-erh⁴ Fan³-ko²-ming⁴ Cheng⁴-pien⁴) or the April 12 Massacre (Chinese: 四一二慘案; pinyin: Sìyī'èr Cǎn'àn; Wade–Giles: Ssu⁴-i¹-erh⁴ Ts'an³-an⁴).

== Background ==
The April 12 Incident was rooted in the Kuomintang's alliance with the Soviet Union, formally initiated by the KMT founder Sun Yat-sen after discussions with Soviet diplomat Adolph Joffe in January 1923. The alliance included both financial and military aid as well as a small but important group of Soviet Comintern political and military advisors headed by Mikhail Borodin.

The Soviet Union's conditions included co-operation with the nascent Chinese Communist Party. Sun agreed to let the Communists join the KMT as individuals but ruled out an alliance with them or their participation as an organized bloc. In addition, he demanded that the Communists, upon joining the KMT, adhere to KMT ideology and observe party discipline. Following their admission to the KMT, Communist activities, often covert, soon attracted opposition to the alliance among prominent KMT members. The power-sharing arrangement was fragile, especially after the Second KMT Congress, whereby the Central Executive Committee lurched to the left with 6 out of the 9 members being leftists and communists. Furthermore, the KMT was still a bourgeois party and the new radicalism unnerved many landowning families. Internal conflicts between left-wing and right-wing factions of the KMT with regards to the United Front with the CCP continued right up to the launch of the Northern Expedition.

Plans for a Northern Expedition originated with Sun Yat-sen. After his expulsion from the government in Peking, he had, by 1920, made a military comeback and gained control of parts of Guangdong province. His goal was to extend his control over all of China, particularly Peking. After Sun's death from cancer in March 1925, KMT leaders continued to push the plan, and after they had purged Guangzhou's Communists and Soviet advisors during the "Canton Coup" on 20 March 1926, they finally launched the Expedition that same June. Initial successes in the first months of the Expedition soon saw the KMT National Revolutionary Army (NRA) in control of Guangdong and large areas in Hunan, Hubei, Jiangxi, and Fujian.

With the growth of KMT authority and military strength, the struggle for control of the Party's direction and leadership intensified. In May 1926, a compromise was reached between Chiang and Borodin, with a series of resolutions passed that barred communists from heading KMT departments, holding more than a third of high level positions in KMT committees, creating factions with the KMT or allowing existing KMT members from joining the communists and compelling the CCP to provide a existing list of KMT members who had dual-loyalties, in return for Chiang's crackdown on the KMT right-wing faction, which infuriated the CCP as they ended up playing second fiddle to the Soviets. The CCP only regained its strength following a temporary alliance with the leftists in the KMT in December 1926.

In January 1927, the NRA, commanded by the right-wing Chiang Kai-shek, captured Wuhan and went on to attack Nanchang, and KMT leader Wang Jingwei and his left-wing allies, along with the Chinese Communists and the Soviet agent Borodin, transferred the seat of the Nationalist Government from Guangzhou to Wuhan. In mid-February, Nationalist troops seized Hangzhou. On 1 March, the Nationalist government dominated by leftists reorganized the Military Commission and placed Chiang under its jurisdiction while it secretly plotted to arrest him. Chiang found out about the plot, which most likely led to his determination to purge the CCP from the KMT.

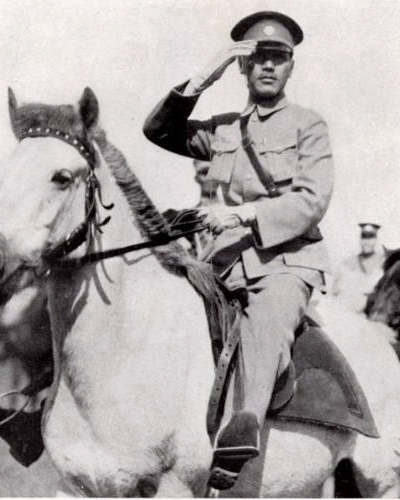
Chiang Kai-shek at the beginning of the Northern Expedition in 1926

On 6 March 1927, the KMT Third Plenum opened in Hankou, Wuhan, but the participants in the conference was dominated by KMT leftists and Chinese communists. Chiang boycotted and in his absence, a leftist-dominated Political Council was established and new measures were promulgated to subordinate the military under its control. At the plenum session, Mao Zedong spoke at length on his Hunan report and on land reforms for peasants.

In response to the advances of the NRA, Communists in Shanghai began to plan uprisings against the warlord forces controlling the city. On 21–22 March, KMT and CCP union workers, led by Zhou Enlai and Chen Duxiu, launched an armed uprising in Shanghai and defeated the warlord forces of the Zhili clique. The victorious union workers occupied and governed urban Shanghai except for the international settlements prior to the arrival of the NRA's Eastern Route Army, led by Generals Bai Chongxi and Li Zongren. Shanghai soon fell to the Nationalists and Chiang moved his headquarters there from Nanchang on 26 March.

After the Nanking Incident in March 1927 in which foreign concessions in Nanking were attacked and looted at the instigation of communist-led elements within the army, both the right-wing faction of the Kuomintang and Western powers along with Japan became alarmed by the growth of the influence of the Communists who had tried to provoke a conflict between Chiang and the Western powers, and continued to organize daily mass student protests and labor strikes to demand the return of Shanghai international settlements to Chinese control.

With Bai's army firmly in control of Shanghai, on 2 April, the Central Control Commission of KMT, led by former Chancellor of Peking University Cai Yuanpei, determined that the CCP actions were anti-revolutionary and undermined the national interest of China, and it voted unanimously to purge the Communists from the KMT.

== Purge ==
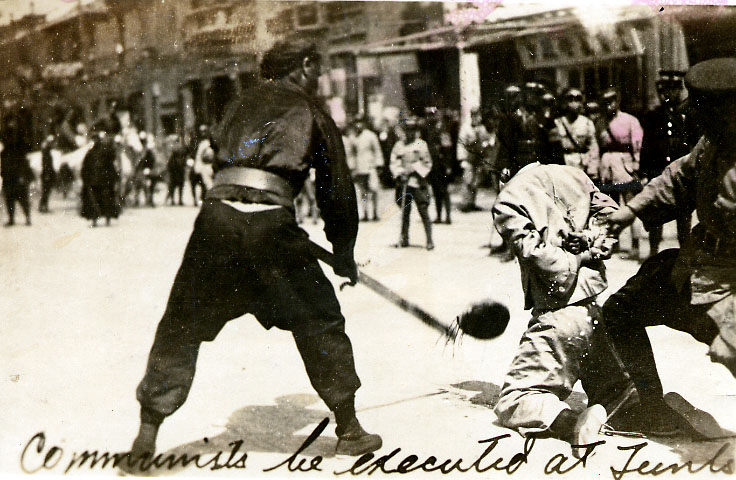
Public beheading of a communist

By 1927, the KMT was divided and Chiang increasing felt threatened with his own supporters wavering due to his perceived vanity and personal ambition. Rumors of a plot to purge, later termed the Chinese White Terror, the CCP and perceived sympathizers in the KMT grew in January. Pressure was exerted by the Shanghai business community, which secretly paid over 3 million dollars at the time to curb the communists influence, having felt unnerved by the events in the "red capital" Hankou as labor militancy there had forced dozens of banks to close with trade at a standstill and a workers' insurrection organized by communist pickets in Shanghai itself. Pressure was also exerted by the Western powers, as they saw the events as a manifestation of the "Bolshevik menace".

On 5 April, Wang Jingwei arrived in Shanghai from overseas and met with the CCP leader Chen Duxiu. After their meeting, they issued a joint declaration reaffirming the principle of cooperation between the KMT and the CCP, despite urgent pleas from Chiang and other KMT elders to eliminate Communist influence. When Wang left Shanghai for Wuhan on 6 April, Chiang asked Green Gang leader Du Yuesheng and other gang leaders in Shanghai to form a rival union (Common Progress Association) to oppose the Shanghai labor union controlled by the Communists, and made final preparations for purging CCP members.

On 9 April, Chiang declared martial law in Shanghai and the Central Control Commission issued the "Party Protection and National Salvation" proclamation (simplified Chinese: 保党救国; traditional Chinese: 保黨救國; pinyin: Bǎo dǎng jiùguó; Wade–Giles: Pao³ tang³ chiu⁴-kuo²), denouncing the Wuhan Nationalist Government's policy of cooperation with the CCP. On 11 April, Chiang issued a secret order to all provinces under the control of his forces to purge Communists from the KMT. That night, Wang Shouhua, the head of the CCP labor union was strangled to death during a dinner with Du and his body was dumped in a shallow grave in the suburbs of Shanghai.

The Shanghai massacre began with assassinations conducted by Chiang's forces on 12 April. Chiang's forces and pro-capitalist criminal gangs attacked CCP members, union leaders of any party affiliation, workers' militia members, student protestors, and other civilians.

Before dawn on 12 April, gang members began to attack district offices controlled by the union workers, including Zhabei, Nanshi, and Pudong. Under an emergency decree, Chiang ordered the 26th Army to disarm the workers' militias; the communists were caught unprepared and were outgunned, as serious resistance was only mounted in the headquarters of the General Labor Union and Commercial Press offices where arms were stored, before they too were crushed after the army brought in machine guns and field artillery; that resulted in more than 300 people being killed and wounded. The union workers organized a strike action on the orders of Zhou Enlai that denounced Chiang's action on 13 April, and thousands of workers and students marched to the headquarters of the 2nd Division of the 26th Army to protest. Soldiers opened fire, killing 100 and wounding many more. Chiang dissolved the provisional government of Shanghai, labor unions and all other organizations under Communist control, and reorganized a network of unions with allegiance to the Kuomintang and under the control of Du Yuesheng. In Canton, the right-wing Governor also proclaimed martial law and rounded up thousands of communists with scores executed. Chinese banks in Canton and Shanghai soon suspended any dealings with Wuhan, with tax collection ceased and daily necessities disappeared from shops in Wuhan.

The death toll in Shanghai was never precisely established. Some sources stated that over 1,000 Communists and KMT leftists were arrested, with some 300 were executed and more than 5,000 went missing; while others stated up to 5,000 to 10,000 Communists and leftists were killed within the following weeks. Western news reports later nicknamed General Bai "The Hewer of Communist Heads". Some National Revolutionary Army commanders with Communist backgrounds who were graduates of Whampoa Military Academy kept their sympathies for the Communists hidden and were not arrested, and many switched their allegiance to the CCP after the start of the Chinese Civil War.

Mao Zedong was attending a meeting of the new KMT Land Committee in Hankou along with Indian Comintern delegate M. N. Roy and Wang Jingwei, when the news of the events in Shanghai came in. For the next 6 days, the CCP Central Bureau debated in almost continuous session on the next course of action. Borodin called for a "strategic retreat" that involved severe restraints on peasant and labor movement in Wuhan government territories and an immediate resumption of the Northern Expedition under the command of Tang Shengzhi, who would linked up with Feng Yuxiang, who was backed by the Soviets to mount an joint campaign against Zhang Zuolin, an idea opposed by Roy, who viewed it as a betrayal of the peasantry by collaborating with the "very forces of reaction". Zhou Enlai, in a telegram proposed a third option, if Tang could take "resolute, punitive action", Chiang's forces might be defeated. Roy's position eventually won out, but Wang Jingwei, with the backing of Borodin resumed the expedition regardless. Mao did not attend these meetings due to his low ranking within the party, but he was sympathetic towards Roy's argument.

== Aftermath and significance ==
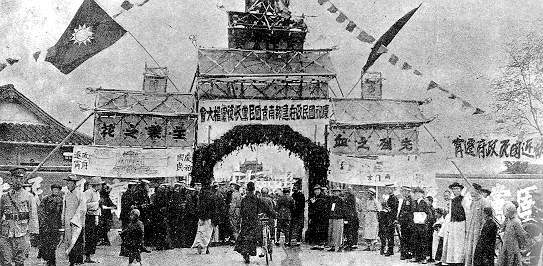
The Nanking Nationalist government was established on April 18, with Chiang Kai-shek as head of government.

Separately, the representatives of the Western powers in Peking authorized the Beiyang government under Manchurian warlord Zhang Zuolin to send Chinese police into the Peking Legation Quarter to raid the Soviet Mission, where many local CCP leaders, including Li Dazhao had taken refuge. Soviet premises in Tianjin were also searched while guards were posted outside the Soviet consulate in Shanghai. Li and his fellow communists were executed by Zhang months later.

In April and May 1927, Hunan was in a state of turmoil as factional conflict spiraled out of control. Xu Kexiang, the KMT regimental commander of the 33rd regiment, 35th army launched an operation to disarm the communists on 21 May. In the course of three weeks, an estimated 10,000 people were killed in Changsha and its immediate vicinity, with groups of suspected communists taken to the execution grounds outside the West Gate. About 80,000 people were killed in Hunan's Liling and about 300,000 Hunanese civilians were killed in Hunan's Chaling County, Leiyang, Liuyang and Pingjiang. It was later termed the "Horse Day Incident".

For the Kuomintang, 39 members of the Kuomintang Central Committee in Wuhan publicly denounced Chiang Kai-shek as a traitor to Sun Yat-sen, including Sun's widow Soong Ching-ling immediately after the purge. However, Chiang was defiant, forming a brand new Nationalist Government to rival the Communist-tolerant Nationalist Government in Wuhan controlled by Wang Jingwei on 18 April. The purges garnered the Nanjing government the support of much of the NRA, the Chinese merchant class, and foreign businesses, bolstering its economic and military position.

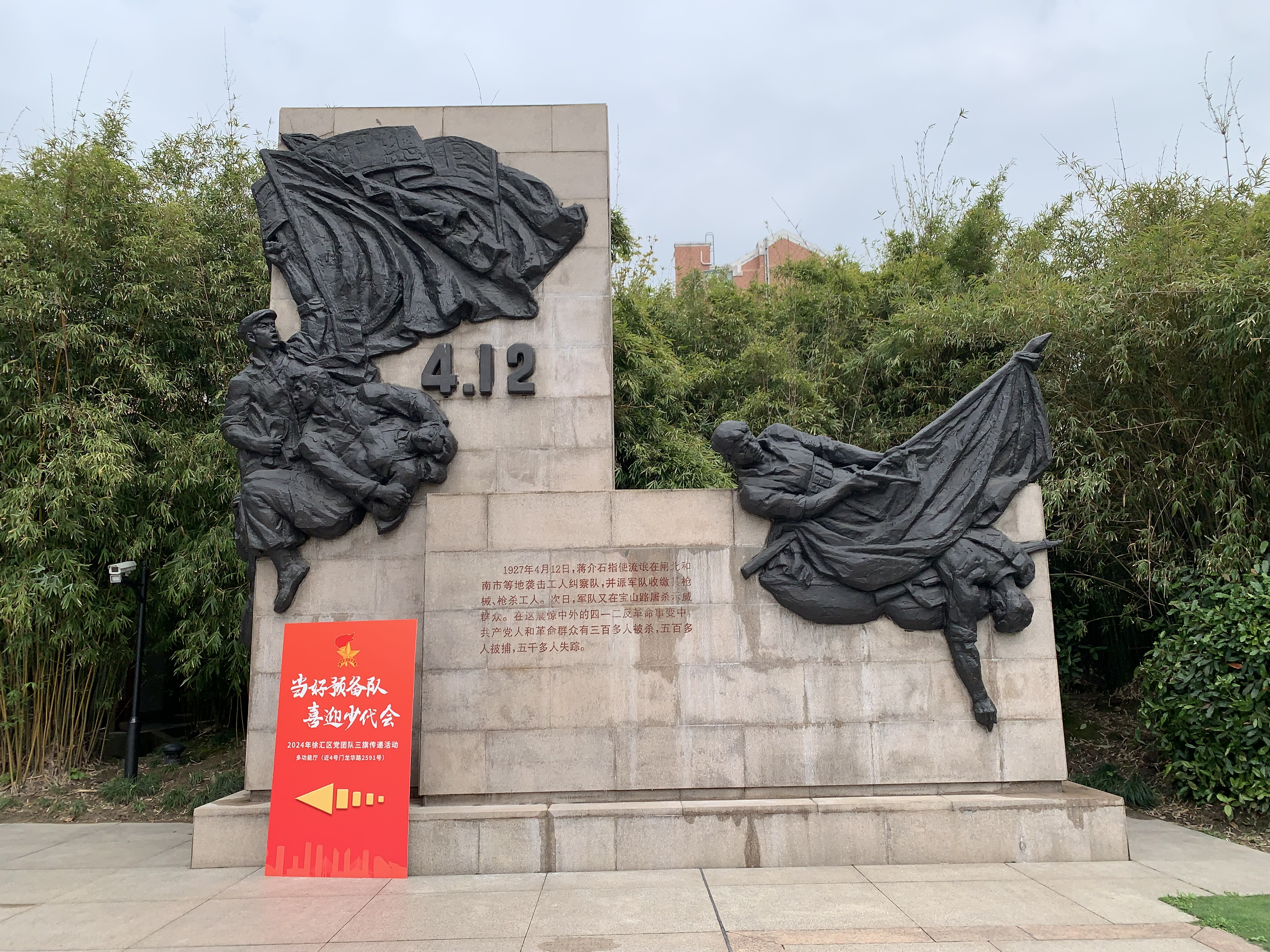
A memorial to the massacre in Longhua Revolutionary Martyr's Cemetery

The twin rival KMT governments, known as the Ninghan (Note: A portmanteau of Nanjing and Wuhan) Split (simplified Chinese: 宁汉分裂; traditional Chinese: 寧漢分裂; pinyin: Nínghàn Fēnliè; Wade–Giles: Ning²-han⁴ Fen¹-lie⁴), did not last long. In May 1927, Communists and peasant leaders in the Wuhan area were repeatedly attacked by Nationalist generals. On 1 June, Joseph Stalin sent a telegram to the Communists in Wuhan, calling for mobilisation of an army of workers and peasants. The Soviet Union officially terminated its cooperation with the KMT. This alarmed Wang Jingwei, who decided to break with the Communists and come to terms with Chiang Kai-shek. Wang's Wuhan-based faction of the KMT expelled Communists from its ranks in the July 15 Incident.

Through the massacre, Chiang secured Shanghai as an additional center of military and financial power. This pushed Wang out of contention for leadership of the KMT. The Wuhan Nationalist government soon disintegrated, leaving Chiang as the sole legitimate leader of the Kuomintang. In the years after April 1927, 300,000 people were killed in Hunan in three years of warfare against the Communists while many Hakkas and She people's whole families were killed in the mountains, including infants, while young women were sold to prostitution.

In early July 1927, Feng Yuxiang allied with Chiang to form a new government in Shaanxi and implemented the White Terror there. By September 1927, they had killed 496 people including students. The Communist central authorities ordered the Shaanxi party branch to respond with peasant revolts. These early responses failed and in March 1928 the Weihua Uprising began.

On the Communists' side, Chen Duxiu and his Soviet advisers, who had promoted cooperation with the KMT, were discredited and lost their leadership roles in the CCP. Chen was personally blamed, forced to resign and replaced by Qu Qiubai, who did not change Chen's policies in any fundamental way. The CCP planned for worker uprisings and revolutions in the urban areas. The White Terror completely routed the Communists, and only 10,000 party members out of 60,000 survived.

The first battles of the ten-year Chinese Civil War began with armed Communist insurrections in Changsha, Nanchang, and Guangzhou. During the Nanchang Uprising in August, Communist troops under Zhu De were defeated but escaped from Kuomintang forces by withdrawing to the mountains of Jiangxi. In September Mao led a small peasant army in the Autumn Harvest Uprising in Hunan. It was brutally crushed and the survivors retreated to Jiangxi as well, forming the first elements of what would become the People's Liberation Army. By the time the CCP Central Committee was forced to flee Shanghai in 1933, Mao had established peasant-based soviets in Jiangxi and Hunan provinces, turning the Communist's base of support from urban proletariat to the countryside, where the People's War would be fought.

In June 1928, the National Revolutionary Army captured the Beiyang government's capital of Beijing, leading to the nominal unification of China and worldwide recognition of the Nationalist government as the legal government of China.

== See also ==
- Outline of the Chinese Civil War
- First United Front
- History of the Republic of China
- Republic of China Armed Forces
- List of massacres in China
- Guangzhou Uprising
- Shanghai Commune of 1927
- Shanghai People's Commune
- Man's Fate, a 1933 novel written by André Malraux
