= Yanavichy =

Urban-type settlement in Vitebsk Region, Belarus

Yanavichy Янавічы (Belarusian) Яновичи (Russian)
- Urban-type settlement
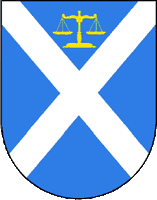
- Coat of arms

- Location within Belarus
- Coordinates: 55°18′N 30°42′E
- Country: Belarus
- Region: Vitebsk Region
- District: Vitebsk District

Population (2025)
  - Total: 632
- Time zone: UTC+3 (MSK)

Yanavichy (Belarusian: Янавічы, romanized: Janavičy; Russian: Яновичи, romanized: Yanovichi; Polish: Janowicze) is an urban-type settlement in Vitebsk District, Vitebsk Region, Belarus. It is located about 36 kilometres (22 mi) east of Vitebsk. As of 2025, it has a population of 632.

== History ==
In 1939, Yanavichy had 709 Jewish residents (34.8% of the total population).

=== World War II ===
On August 15, 1941, 149 Jews from the village were shot in the nearby village of Valki. On September 10, 1941, a ghetto of Jews in the village was liquidated and the inhabitants shot in the nearby village of Zaitsevo.
