= Xu Shiying =

Chinese politician (1873–1964)

- 許世英
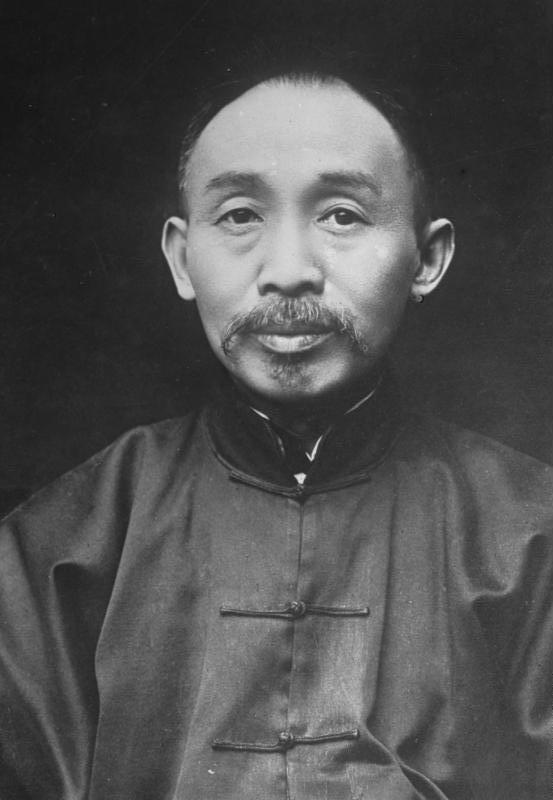

Premier of China
- In office 26 December 1925 – 4 March 1926
- President: Duan Qirui
- Preceded by: Huang Fu (acting)
- Succeeded by: Jia Deyao

Minister of Interior
- In office 30 June 1916 – 12 July 1916
- Premier: Duan Xirui
- Preceded by: Wang Yitang
- Succeeded by: Sun Hung-yi

Minister of Justice
- In office 29 November 1922 – 4 January 1923
- Premier: Wang Daxie; Wang Zhengting
- Preceded by: Xu Qian
- Succeeded by: Wang Zhengting
- In office 26 July 1912 – 4 September 1913
- Premier: Lu Zhengxiang; Zhao Bingjun; Duan Qirui (acting); Xiong Xiling
- Preceded by: Wang Chonghui
- Succeeded by: Wang Shitong (acting); Liang Qichao

Personal details
- Born: 10 September 1873 Guichi District, Qing dynasty
- Died: 13 October 1964 (aged 91) Taipei, Taiwan
- Party: Kuomintang

Xu Shiying (Chinese: 許世英; 10 September 1873 – 13 October 1964, also romanized into Wades-Giles as Hsu Shih-ing) was a Chinese Kuomintang politician who served as Premier of the China from 26 December 1925 to 4 March 1926. He is known as a staunch believer in the rule of law and Western-style legal tenets. Xu contributed to the modernization of the judicial system in China and for initiating prison reform during the presidency of Yuan Shikai.

== Biography ==
Xu was born on 10 September 1873, in Guichi, in the eastern Anhui province. He began his career at the Law Compilation Bureau, in the Board of Justice in 1897. After a year, he was appointed to the Board of Punishments. By the age of 25, he was made a Senior Licentiate of the Qing dynasty.

Xu followed his mentor, Shen Jiaben to Taiwan during the Qing government in exile. In 1900, they went back to China where Xu was tasked to head an Outer Beijing city police supervision of infrastructure projects.

In 1908, he was promoted as the associate chief of the high court of justice in the province of Fengtian. Two years later, he was part of the delegation sent to inspect the judicial systems in Europe. He also led the first formal Qing delegation that attended the Eighth International Prison Congress in Washington, D.C. As part of the government's drive to build a modern judicial system, he was appointed Minister of Justice in 1912.

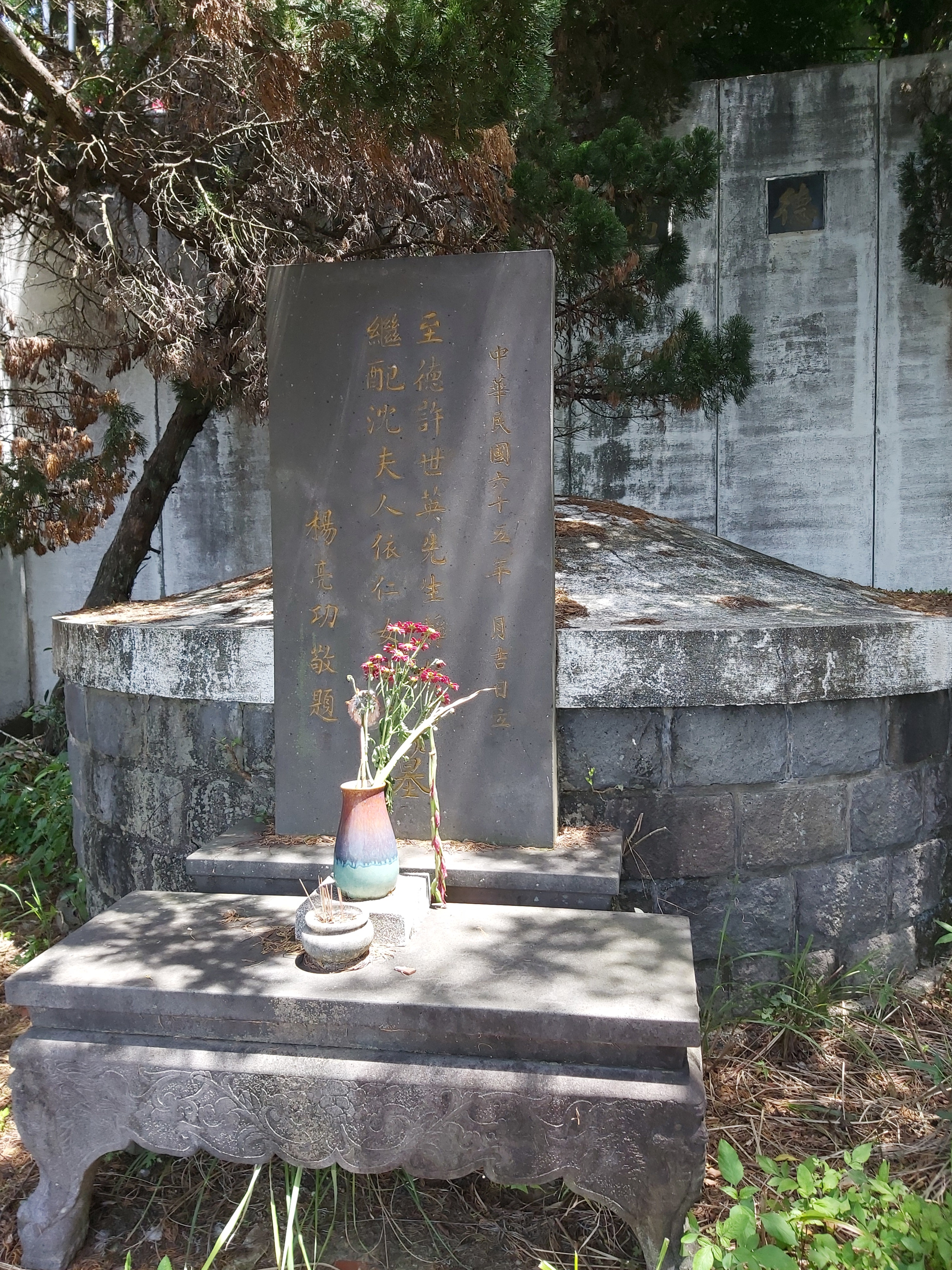
Tomb of Xu Shiying in Yangmingshan Cemetery, Taipei.

Among Xu's career highlights include his appointment as minister of the interior in 1916; and his appointment, in 1924, to chief secretary of Marshal Duan Qirui, who was head of the Provisional Government of China. Xu was later the Chinese ambassador to Japan, and the chairman of a Chinese delegation for peace negotiations with KMT China.

Xu died in Taipei, Taiwan.
