= 2nd National Congress of the Kuomintang =

The 2nd National Congress of the Kuomintang (Chinese: 中國國民黨第二次全國代表大会) was the second national congress of the Kuomintang, held from 1 to 19 January 1926 at Guangzhou, Guangdong, Republic of China.

== Results ==
Chiang Kai-shek was elected to the Central Executive Committee of the Kuomintang for the very first time.

== See also ==
- Kuomintang
