= Sun–Joffe Manifesto =

1923 agreement between China and the Soviet Union

Sun–Joffe Manifesto or the Joint Manifesto of Sun and Joffe (孫文越飛宣言) was an agreement signed between Sun Yat-sen and Adolph Joffe on January 26, 1923, for the cooperation of Republic of China's Kuomintang and Soviet Union. The manifesto asserted that the Soviet system was not suitable for China and announced in general terms the willingness of Soviet to co-operate with the KMT in its struggle to unify China.

== Background ==
In 1918, Georgy Chicherin of the Soviet Union Council of the People's Commissars announced Soviet intention to relinquish Russian rights and privileges acquired in China. A formal note to open negotiations was sent to the Chinese Foreign Minister in Beijing on October 27, 1920. The Bolsheviks sent M.I. Yurin, Alexander Paikes and Adolph Joffe.

== Signing ==
Joffe would not settle the question of Outer Mongolia or the Chinese Far Eastern Railway but was successful in establishing a political relations with Sun Yat-sen. On January 26, 1923, Sun and Joffe issued the manifesto, which became the foundation of co-operation between the Kuomintang and Soviet Union. In July 1923, Sun sent Chiang Kai-shek to Russia to study Soviet military and political conditions.

== See also ==
- Li–Lobanov Treaty
- Chinese Civil War
