= Tang Shengzhi =

Chinese warlord (1889–1970)

- 唐生智
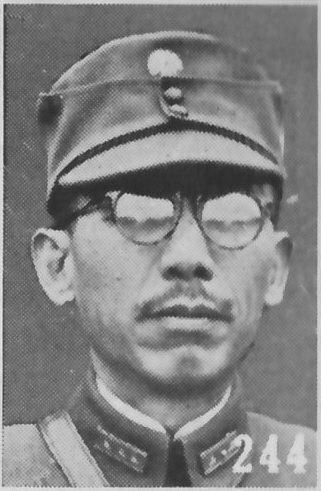
- Tang Shengzhi as pictured in The Most Recent Biographies of Chinese Dignitaries
- Born: 12 October 1889; Dong'an County, Hunan, Qing China
- Died: 6 April 1970 (aged 80); Changsha, Hunan, China
- Military career
- Allegiance: China
- Service years: 1914–1949
- Rank: General
- Unit: 4th Division
- Commands: Garrison commander of Nanjing
- Conflicts: Xinhai Revolution; Northern Expedition; Central Plains War; Second Sino-Japanese War; Chinese Civil War
- Awards: Order of Blue Sky and White Sun
- Other work: Politician

Tang Shengzhi (Chinese: 唐生智; pinyin: Táng Shēngzhì; Wade–Giles: T'ang Sheng-chih, 12 October 1889 – 6 April 1970) was a Chinese general and politician. A graduate of the Baoding Military Academy, he rose through the Hunan Army in the 1920s and brought his forces into the National Revolutionary Army during the Northern Expedition. In 1927, he was a leading military figure of the Wuhan government and opposed the Nanjing government of Chiang Kai-shek, against whom he revolted again in 1929. He commanded the defense of Nanjing against the Japanese in December 1937, and the city's fall was followed by the Nanjing Massacre. In 1949, he supported the peaceful handover of Hunan to the Communists, and he later held posts in the People's Republic of China, including vice governor of Hunan.

== Early life ==
Tang was born in 1889 in Dong'an County, Hunan He graduated from the Baoding Military Academy. According to the later recollection of the Hunan governor Zhao Hengti, Tang and He Yaozu belonged to a "new faction" of Baoding graduates within the Hunan Army.

== Military career ==
In July 1923, when Tan Yankai prepared to return to Hunan and fight Zhao, Zhao sent troops against him, and a brigade under Tang advanced from Changde toward Chenzhou. In August 1923, after Tan entered Hunan, Tang joined He Yaozu, Ye Kaixin and other brigade commanders in issuing telegrams that opposed Tan and supported Zhao. Tang was among the officers whom Zhao rewarded with military and political posts, but he rose against Zhao in 1926.

=== Northern Expedition and the Wuhan government ===
Tang in 1927

Tang forces joined the National Revolutionary Army as its Eighth army, following a meeting with Wang Jingwei in February 1926. Following Chiang Kai-shek's appointment as Commander-in-Chief of the Northern expedition on July 27th, 1926, it was decided that Tang would lead the Central army (combining the forces of Li Jishen and Li Zongren) in its push towards Wuhan in Wu Peifu's Hubei. After a number of failed assaults, the siege of Wuchang, and victory in Hanyang, Tang's troops eventually entered the city on September 4th. Tang took advantage of Chiang, Li Zongren, Tan Yakai, and Cheng Qian's forces subsequent defeat in Jiangxi, and unsuccessfully tried to seize Hubei. Tang further suffered an important defeat in Eastern Hubei.

Still, by late 1926, the Chinese Communist Party (CCP) Central Committee judged that his power in Hunan and Hubei remained very great. In a letter of 9 November 1926, the Central Committee reported that party members in Guangdong regarded Tang as more unreliable and dangerous than Chiang Kai-shek, but it argued that Tang's conduct so far had been better than Chiang's. The letter stated that Tang wanted a position in the government and in the Kuomintang (KMT), and it proposed using personal contacts, mass organizations and the influence of Soviet advisers to push him to the left. In December 1926, the Central Committee described Tang as "a cunning man, a true military politician" who lacked long-term vision, and it argued that the party needed him to restrain Chiang.

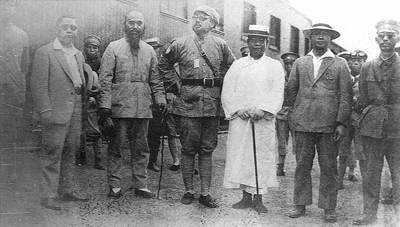
Tang (far right) at Zhengzhou meeting in 1927 between leaders of the Wuhan government and the 'Guominjun' Northwest faction

In his report on the peasant movement in Hunan, written in March 1927, Mao Zedong described village children playing a game in which one child acted as Tang and another as his rival Ye Kaixin, with "the pursuer" always being Tang. An editorial note to the report describes Tang as a general who sided with the revolution during the Northern Expedition. The American journalist Harold Isaacs wrote in 1938 that by mid-1927 Tang and Wang Jingwei were preparing to break with Moscow, and that after a hurried trip to Hunan, Tang confirmed what he called a communist conspiracy against the KMT and advised the immediate expulsion of the communists. Isaacs also argued that Tang's "Napoleonic ambitions" fed the hopes of the leaders of the Wuhan government of forcing Chiang to terms.

After Chiang's resignation in 1927, Tang prepared to oppose Feng Yuxiang, who had advanced down the Beijing–Hankou railway, according to an American consular report from Hankou. On 12 October 1927, negotiations reportedly produced an agreement naming Tang commander-in-chief of the combined Nationalist forces of the Nanjing and Wuhan regimes. Tang and Wang nevertheless remained reluctant to associate themselves with Nanjing, and on 25 October Tang denounced the Nanjing Special Committee in a circular telegram, declaring that he would fight "against the usurpers at Nanking". As Nanjing's forces advanced up the Yangtze, his position became untenable, and on 12 November 1927 he resigned and left Wuhan. Four days later, Li Zongren's forces entered into Wuhan. Tang left to Japan to study Buddhism and, a month later, Wang left Shanghai heading to France for a rest cure.

=== Revolt of 1929 ===
Tang in 1929

In December 1929, Tang led a revolt against the Nanjing government that was centered on Henan and reportedly drew support from as many as seventy lesser generals. According to the American chargé d'affaires, its real cause had not been revealed, but it was linked to Tang's demand that General Liu Zhi give up Hubei and to his decision to take Hankou by force after Liu refused. The Spectator reported that several generals who had largely supported the uprising held back after learning of Tang's alleged collusion with the communists. Tang's advance was halted by a rally of support for Chiang, by Liu's army and by severe winter weather, and by 6 January 1930 he was being pushed back along the Beijing–Hankou railway. The American minister reported that the first week of January marked the beginning of the revolt's collapse, as Liu's forces advanced from the south and the troops of Yan Xishan pressed from the north. The government offered rewards for Tang's capture or killing.

=== Battle of Nanjing ===
In November 1937, as Japanese forces advanced on Nanjing during the Second Sino-Japanese War, Chiang held conferences on whether to defend the capital, and Li Zongren and others argued against making a stand. Tang, whom the historian David Askew describes as a devout Buddhist, a former warlord and a onetime rival of Chiang, made an emotional plea to fight, declaring, "I advocate defending Nanking to the end and fighting the enemy to the death." Chiang overruled the opposing arguments and appointed Tang commander of the forces assigned to defend the capital and inflict as much damage as possible on the Japanese. In his later account, Tang wrote that he had favored fighting only to buy time for the rest of the army to retreat. The historian Peter Harmsen notes that Tang wrote his memoir after he had chosen to remain in the People's Republic of China.

Askew estimates the strength of the garrison under Tang at between 73,790 and 81,500 men. Its 36th Division was ordered to supervise the rear and to shoot soldiers who abandoned their positions. On 28 November 1937, at a meeting with foreign residents, Tang warned foreigners without urgent business to leave the city, and he said that he was "determined to afford all possible protection to foreign lives and property".

In December, the International Committee for the Nanking Safety Zone proposed a three-day truce, under which Japanese forces would hold their positions while Chinese forces withdrew from the walled city, and on 9 December it reported that it had secured Tang's agreement. The Chinese foreign ministry told the American ambassador that Tang had not approved the plan, and Chiang said that he was not in a position to accept it. On 10 December, the committee reported that Tang considered the proposal "right and proper for humanitarian reasons", but that he had to refer the question of withdrawal to the highest authority because he was under orders to defend Nanjing.

On 12 December 1937, Tang left the city through the Yijiang Gate and crossed the Yangtze to safety. Near the gate, many retreating soldiers were shot by men of the 36th Division, who took them for deserters. The battle ended with the Japanese capture of Nanjing on 13 December, and the Nanjing Massacre followed. Rumors spread among foreigners in the city that Tang had been executed for his failure, but Chiang protected him from punishment. Shortly afterward, Tang met Li Zongren at the railway station in Xuzhou and apologized for how quickly Nanjing had fallen, and Li told him not to worry.

== Later life ==
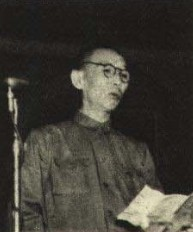
Tang speaking at the 1st CPCC National Committee (1950)

In late March 1949, Mao sent a telegram inviting Tang, Qiu Ao and others to Beiping to discuss the founding of a new state at the first session of the Chinese People's Political Consultative Conference (CPPCC). Tang returned to Dong'an, where he was involved with the Yaoxiang Middle School, and he contacted local armed groups to prepare an uprising. On 4 August 1949, Cheng Qian and Chen Mingren announced the uprising of the Nationalist forces in Changsha, and on 5 August Tang led 104 prominent Hunan figures in a telegram supporting it. In September 1949, troops of Bai Chongxi surrounded his Shude Mountain Villa in Dong'an. Tang evaded capture, but his relatives and friends were detained, and his friend Gu Boxu was tortured and left disabled.

After the founding of the People's Republic of China in 1949, Tang became a member of the Hunan Provisional Military and Political Committee in 1949. In 1950, he joined the Hunan Land Reform Committee and the Central-South Military and Administrative Committee, and he became a member of the Standing Committee of the National Defense Council and a vice governor of Hunan. In April 1950, Mao received and hosted him in Beijing. He sat on the Standing Committees of the 2nd and 3rd National People's Congresses and of the 2nd to 4th National Committees of the CPPCC, and he was a vice chairman of the Hunan CPPCC. He joined the Revolutionary Committee of the Chinese Kuomintang in 1950 and was elected to its central standing committee in 1956 and 1958. He called for the peaceful reunification of China and wrote to Chiang Kai-shek urging a third period of cooperation between the KMT and the CCP. Tang died in 6 April 1970 in Changsha.

== Personal life ==
Tang was a devout Buddhist and became known as the "Buddhist General". His younger brother, Tang Shengming, was also a Nationalist general. During the war with Japan, Chiang sent Tang Shengming to Shanghai to gather intelligence inside the Wang Jingwei regime, and Tang Shengming publicly renounced his brotherhood with Tang Shengzhi in a newspaper.

According to the Taiwanese magazine Mirror Media, Tang had no son and adopted 13 war orphans, who held a much lower status in the family than his own children. His daughter's first husband, Li Yinshi, an instructor at the Central Aviation Academy, was killed in a plane crash in 1938. She later wished to marry Ai Renkuan, one of the adopted orphans, and Tang was reportedly so angry that he threatened to shoot her, but he relented, and the couple married in 1949. Their children include the feminist scholar and documentary filmmaker Ai Xiaoming and her younger brother, the businessman Ai Luming. The magazine states that Tang's daughter was never able to attend a memorial ceremony for her father before her own death.

== Legacy ==
In February 2023, the Tang Shengzhi Former Residence in Yongzhou was named one of the first united front education bases of Hunan Province.
