= List of Chinese leaders =

In this article, "China" refers to the modern territories controlled by the People's Republic of China (which controls Mainland China, Hong Kong and Macau) and the Republic of China (which controls Taiwan area). For more information, see Two Chinas, Political status of Taiwan, One-China policy, 1992 Consensus and One country, two systems.

"China" also refers to many historical states, empires and dynasties that controlled parts of what are now the PRC and the ROC. For leaders of ancient and imperial China, see List of Chinese monarchs.

Historical parties

Tongmenghui
Beiyang clique
Progressive

Modern parties

Kuomintang (Nationalist)
Chinese Communist Party
Revolutionary Committee of the Chinese Kuomintang
Democratic Progressive Party
Non-partisan

== List ==
=== Presidents ===
Year	(Taiwan) President of the Republic of China (Mainland China)
1912
Sun Yat-sen
Yuan Shikai
1913
1914
1915
1916
Li Yuanhong
1917
Feng Guozhang
1918
Xu Shichang
1919
1920
1921
1922
Zhou Ziqi (acting)
Li Yuanhong
1923
Gao Lingwei (acting)
Cao Kun
1924
Huang Fu (acting)
Duan Qirui (acting)
1925
1926
Hu Weide (acting)
Yan Huiqing (acting)
Du Xigui (acting)
V.K. Wellington Koo Wei-chün (acting)
1927
Zhang Zuolin (acting)
1928
Chiang Kai-shek
1929
1930
1931
Lin Sen
1932
1933
1934
1935
1936
1937
1938
1939
1940
1941
1942
1943
Chiang Kai-shek
1944
1945
1946
1947
1948
1949
Li Zongren (acting)
Year	President of the Republic of China (Taiwan)	Chairman / President of the People's Republic of China (Mainland China)
1949	Li Zongren (acting)	Mao Zedong
1950
Chiang Kai-shek
1951
1952
1953
1954
1955
1956
1957
1958
1959
Liu Shaoqi
1960
1961
1962
1963
1964
1965
1966
1967
1968
Soong Ching-ling (acting)	Dong Biwu (acting)
1969
1970
1971
1972
Dong Biwu (acting)
1973
1974
1975
Presidency abolished
Yen Chia-kan
1976
1977
1978
Chiang Ching-kuo
1979
1980
1981
Soong Ching-ling (honorary)
Presidency abolished
1982
1983
Li Xiannian
1984
1985
1986
1987
1988
Lee Teng-hui
Yang Shangkun
1989
1990
1991
1992
1993
Jiang Zemin
1994
1995
1996
1997
1998
1999
2000
Chen Shui-bian
2001
2002
Hu Jintao
2003
2004
2005
2006
2007
2008
Ma Ying-jeou
2009
2010
2011
2012
Xi Jinping
2013
2014
2015
2016
Tsai Ing-Wen
2017
2018
2019
2020
2021
2022
2023
2024
Lai Ching-te
2025
2026

=== Premiers ===
Year	(Taiwan) Premier of the Republic of China (Mainland China)
1912	Tang Shaoyi
Lu Zhengxiang
Zhao Bingjun
1913
Xiong Xiling
1914
Sun Baoqi
Xu Shichang
1915
Lu Zhengxiang (acting)
1916
Xu Shichang
Duan Qirui
Duan Qirui
1917
Wu Tingfang (acting)
Li Jingxi
Duan Qirui
Wang Daxie (acting)
Wang Shizhen (acting)
1918
Qian Nengxun (acting)
Duan Qirui
Qian Nengxun (acting)
1919
Gong Xinzhan (acting)
Jin Yunpeng (acting)
Jin Yunpeng
1920
Sa Zhenbing
Jin Yunpeng
1921
Yan Huiqing (acting)
Liang Shiyi
1922
Yan Huiqing (acting)
Wang Chonghui (acting)
Wang Daxie (acting)
Wang Zhengting (acting)
1923
Zhang Shaozeng
Gao Lingwei
1924
Sun Baoqi
Wellington Koo (acting)
Yan Huiqing
Huang Fu
Post abolished
1925
Xu Shiying
1926
Jia Deyao (acting)
Hu Weide (acting)
Yan Huiqing
Du Xigui (acting)
Wellington Koo (acting)
1927
Pan Fu (acting)
Post abolished
1928
Tan Yankai
1929
1930
T. V. Soong
Chiang Kai-shek
1931
Chen Mingshu
1932
Sun Fo
Wang Jingwei
1933
1934
1935
Chiang Kai-shek
1936
1937
1938
H. H. Kung
Chiang Kai-shek
1939
1940
1941
1942
1943
1944
1945	T. V. Soong
1946
1947	Chiang Kai-shek
1948	Chang Chun
Wong Wen-hao
1949	Sun Fo
Ho Ying-chin
Year	Premier of the Republic of China (Taiwan)	Premier of the People's Republic of China (Mainland China)
1949	Yan Xishan	Zhou Enlai
1950
Chen Cheng
1951
1952
1953
1954
Yu Hung-chun
1955
1956
1957
1958
Chen Cheng
1959
1960
1961
1962
1963
Yen Chia-kan
1964
1965
1966
1967
1968
1969
1970
1971
1972
Chiang Ching-kuo
1973
1974
1975
1976	Hua Guofeng (acting)
Hua Guofeng
1977
1978
1978	Sun Yun-suan
1979
1980
Zhao Ziyang (acting)
1981
1982
1983
1984
Yu Kuo-hwa	Zhao Ziyang
1985
1986
1987
Li Peng (acting)
1988
1989
Lee Huan	Li Peng
1990
Hau Pei-tsun
1991
1992
1993
Lien Chan
1994
1995
1996
1997
Vincent Siew
1998
Zhu Rongji
1999
2000
Tang Fei
Chang Chun-hsiung
2001
2002
Yu Shyi-kun
2003
Wen Jiabao
2004
2005
Frank Hsieh
2006
Su Tseng-chang
2007
Chang Chun-hsiung
2008
Liu Chao-shiuan
2009
Wu Den-yih
2010
2011
2012
Sean Chen
2013
Jiang Yi-huah	Li Keqiang
2014
Mao Chi-kuo
2015
2016
Chang San-cheng
Lin Chuan
2017
Lai Ching‑te
2018
2019
Su Tseng-chang
2020
2021
2022
2023	Chen Chien-jen	Li Qiang
2024	Cho Jung-tai
2025
2026

== See also ==
=== Incumbents ===
- Paramount leader, an informal list of those who have been considered the highest leader of the Chinese Communist Party and the People's Republic of China
- Leader of the Chinese Communist Party
- Chairman of the Kuomintang
- List of leaders of the People's Republic of China of institutions
- List of national leaders of the People's Republic of China
- List of leaders of the Republic of China

=== Hong Kong and Macau ===
- Chief Executive of Hong Kong (1997–present)
- Chief Executive of Macau (1999–present)
- Chief Secretary for Administration of Hong Kong (1997–present)
- Secretary for Administration and Justice of Macau (1999–present)

=== Taiwan ===
- Governor-General of Taiwan (1895–1945)
- List of rulers of Taiwan
