= List of leaders of the Republic of China =

Overview of heads of state of the Republic of China

This is a list of heads of state of the Republic of China:

== Current office holders ==
President of the Republic of China
Lai Ching-te	Institution	Presidency	The President is legally the nation's head of state who is responsible for the Republic of China's image. The office is an executive role and, therefore, holds responsibilities such as greeting foreign dignitaries and signing the appointment of embassy staff. This position is directly elected by the citizens of the Free Area. Until 1996, it was indirectly elected by the National Assembly.
Lai Ching-te	Current holder	Lai Ching-te (William Lai)	The President is legally the nation's head of state who is responsible for the Republic of China's image. The office is an executive role and, therefore, holds responsibilities such as greeting foreign dignitaries and signing the appointment of embassy staff. This position is directly elected by the citizens of the Free Area. Until 1996, it was indirectly elected by the National Assembly.
Lai Ching-te	Birthplace	Wanli Township, Taipei County, Taiwan Province	The President is legally the nation's head of state who is responsible for the Republic of China's image. The office is an executive role and, therefore, holds responsibilities such as greeting foreign dignitaries and signing the appointment of embassy staff. This position is directly elected by the citizens of the Free Area. Until 1996, it was indirectly elected by the National Assembly.
Lai Ching-te	Party	Democratic Progressive Party	The President is legally the nation's head of state who is responsible for the Republic of China's image. The office is an executive role and, therefore, holds responsibilities such as greeting foreign dignitaries and signing the appointment of embassy staff. This position is directly elected by the citizens of the Free Area. Until 1996, it was indirectly elected by the National Assembly.
Lai Ching-te	Since	20 May 2024	The President is legally the nation's head of state who is responsible for the Republic of China's image. The office is an executive role and, therefore, holds responsibilities such as greeting foreign dignitaries and signing the appointment of embassy staff. This position is directly elected by the citizens of the Free Area. Until 1996, it was indirectly elected by the National Assembly.
President of the Executive Yuan
Cho Jung-tai	Institution	Executive Yuan	The President of the Executive Yuan is the highest administrative position in the Government of the Republic of China. The Premier is nominally the principal advisor to the president of the Republic and holds the highest rank in the civil service of the central government and presides over the Executive Yuan Council, which makes up the official cabinet. The vice premier, ministers, and chairpersons of the Executive Yuan Council are appointed by the president on the recommendation of the premier. The premier's official duties also include presenting administrative policies and reports to the Legislators, responding to the interpellations of legislators (much like Question Time in some parliamentary systems), and, with the approval of the president, asking the Legislators to reconsider its resolutions. Laws and decrees promulgated by the President must also be countersigned by the Premier.
Cho Jung-tai	Current holder	Cho Jung-tai	
Cho Jung-tai	Birthplace	Taipei City, Taiwan Province	
Cho Jung-tai	Party	Democratic Progressive Party	
Cho Jung-tai	Since	20 May 2024	
President of the Legislative Yuan
Yu Shyi-kin	Institution	Legislative Yuan	The President of the Legislative Yuan presides over the Yuan Sittings and the meetings of the Committee of the Entire Yuan and is responsible for the administration of the Yuan. In the cases in which the president of the Legislative Yuan is unable to attend to his or her duties, the vice president acts in his or her place.
Yu Shyi-kin	Current holder	Han Kuo-yu	The President of the Legislative Yuan presides over the Yuan Sittings and the meetings of the Committee of the Entire Yuan and is responsible for the administration of the Yuan. In the cases in which the president of the Legislative Yuan is unable to attend to his or her duties, the vice president acts in his or her place.
Yu Shyi-kin	Birthplace	Banqiao Township, Taipei County, Taiwan Province	The President of the Legislative Yuan presides over the Yuan Sittings and the meetings of the Committee of the Entire Yuan and is responsible for the administration of the Yuan. In the cases in which the president of the Legislative Yuan is unable to attend to his or her duties, the vice president acts in his or her place.
Yu Shyi-kin	Party	Kuomintang	The President of the Legislative Yuan presides over the Yuan Sittings and the meetings of the Committee of the Entire Yuan and is responsible for the administration of the Yuan. In the cases in which the president of the Legislative Yuan is unable to attend to his or her duties, the vice president acts in his or her place.
Yu Shyi-kin	Since	1 February 2024	The President of the Legislative Yuan presides over the Yuan Sittings and the meetings of the Committee of the Entire Yuan and is responsible for the administration of the Yuan. In the cases in which the president of the Legislative Yuan is unable to attend to his or her duties, the vice president acts in his or her place.
President of the Judicial Yuan
Shieh Ming-yan	Institution	Judicial Yuan	The President of the Judicial Yuan is also called the Chief justice, which mandated that the position holder shall also be a justice in the Constitutional Court. The President shall be nominated and, with the consent of the Control Yuan, appointed by the President of the Republic. In the current constitution, the President of the Judicial Yuan shall be nominated by the President of the Republic and approved by the Legislative Yuan.
Shieh Ming-yan	Current holder	Shieh Ming-yan	The President of the Judicial Yuan is also called the Chief justice, which mandated that the position holder shall also be a justice in the Constitutional Court. The President shall be nominated and, with the consent of the Control Yuan, appointed by the President of the Republic. In the current constitution, the President of the Judicial Yuan shall be nominated by the President of the Republic and approved by the Legislative Yuan.
Shieh Ming-yan	Birthplace	Taiwan	The President of the Judicial Yuan is also called the Chief justice, which mandated that the position holder shall also be a justice in the Constitutional Court. The President shall be nominated and, with the consent of the Control Yuan, appointed by the President of the Republic. In the current constitution, the President of the Judicial Yuan shall be nominated by the President of the Republic and approved by the Legislative Yuan.
Shieh Ming-yan	Party	Independent	The President of the Judicial Yuan is also called the Chief justice, which mandated that the position holder shall also be a justice in the Constitutional Court. The President shall be nominated and, with the consent of the Control Yuan, appointed by the President of the Republic. In the current constitution, the President of the Judicial Yuan shall be nominated by the President of the Republic and approved by the Legislative Yuan.
Shieh Ming-yan	Since	1 November 2024	The President of the Judicial Yuan is also called the Chief justice, which mandated that the position holder shall also be a justice in the Constitutional Court. The President shall be nominated and, with the consent of the Control Yuan, appointed by the President of the Republic. In the current constitution, the President of the Judicial Yuan shall be nominated by the President of the Republic and approved by the Legislative Yuan.
President of the Examination Yuan
Chou Hung-hsien	Institution	Examination Yuan	The President of the Examination Yuan is responsible for the oversight to administrate all national exams and is responsible for the examinations and management of all civil service personnel.
Chou Hung-hsien	Current holder	Chou Hung-hsien	The President of the Examination Yuan is responsible for the oversight to administrate all national exams and is responsible for the examinations and management of all civil service personnel.
Chou Hung-hsien	Birthplace	Dalin, Chiayi County, Taiwan	The President of the Examination Yuan is responsible for the oversight to administrate all national exams and is responsible for the examinations and management of all civil service personnel.
Chou Hung-hsien	Party	Democratic Progressive Party	The President of the Examination Yuan is responsible for the oversight to administrate all national exams and is responsible for the examinations and management of all civil service personnel.
Chou Hung-hsien	Since	20 December 2024	The President of the Examination Yuan is responsible for the oversight to administrate all national exams and is responsible for the examinations and management of all civil service personnel.
President of the Control Yuan
Lee Hung-chun	Institution	Control Yuan	The President of the Control Yuan oversees the affairs of the Yuan and supervise subordinate agencies, exercises constitutional powers of impeachment, censure, and audit and proposes corrective measures in overseeing government, effectively achieving good governance, protecting human rights, and fighting corruption. The President also presided over Control Yuan meetings when it functioned as a parliamentary chamber.
Lee Hung-chun	Current holder	Lee Hung-chun	The President of the Control Yuan oversees the affairs of the Yuan and supervise subordinate agencies, exercises constitutional powers of impeachment, censure, and audit and proposes corrective measures in overseeing government, effectively achieving good governance, protecting human rights, and fighting corruption. The President also presided over Control Yuan meetings when it functioned as a parliamentary chamber.
Lee Hung-chun	Birthplace	Taipei County, Taiwan	The President of the Control Yuan oversees the affairs of the Yuan and supervise subordinate agencies, exercises constitutional powers of impeachment, censure, and audit and proposes corrective measures in overseeing government, effectively achieving good governance, protecting human rights, and fighting corruption. The President also presided over Control Yuan meetings when it functioned as a parliamentary chamber.
Lee Hung-chun	Party	Independent	The President of the Control Yuan oversees the affairs of the Yuan and supervise subordinate agencies, exercises constitutional powers of impeachment, censure, and audit and proposes corrective measures in overseeing government, effectively achieving good governance, protecting human rights, and fighting corruption. The President also presided over Control Yuan meetings when it functioned as a parliamentary chamber.
Lee Hung-chun	Since	10 February 2025	The President of the Control Yuan oversees the affairs of the Yuan and supervise subordinate agencies, exercises constitutional powers of impeachment, censure, and audit and proposes corrective measures in overseeing government, effectively achieving good governance, protecting human rights, and fighting corruption. The President also presided over Control Yuan meetings when it functioned as a parliamentary chamber.

== Historical office holders ==
=== Military Governments (1911) ===
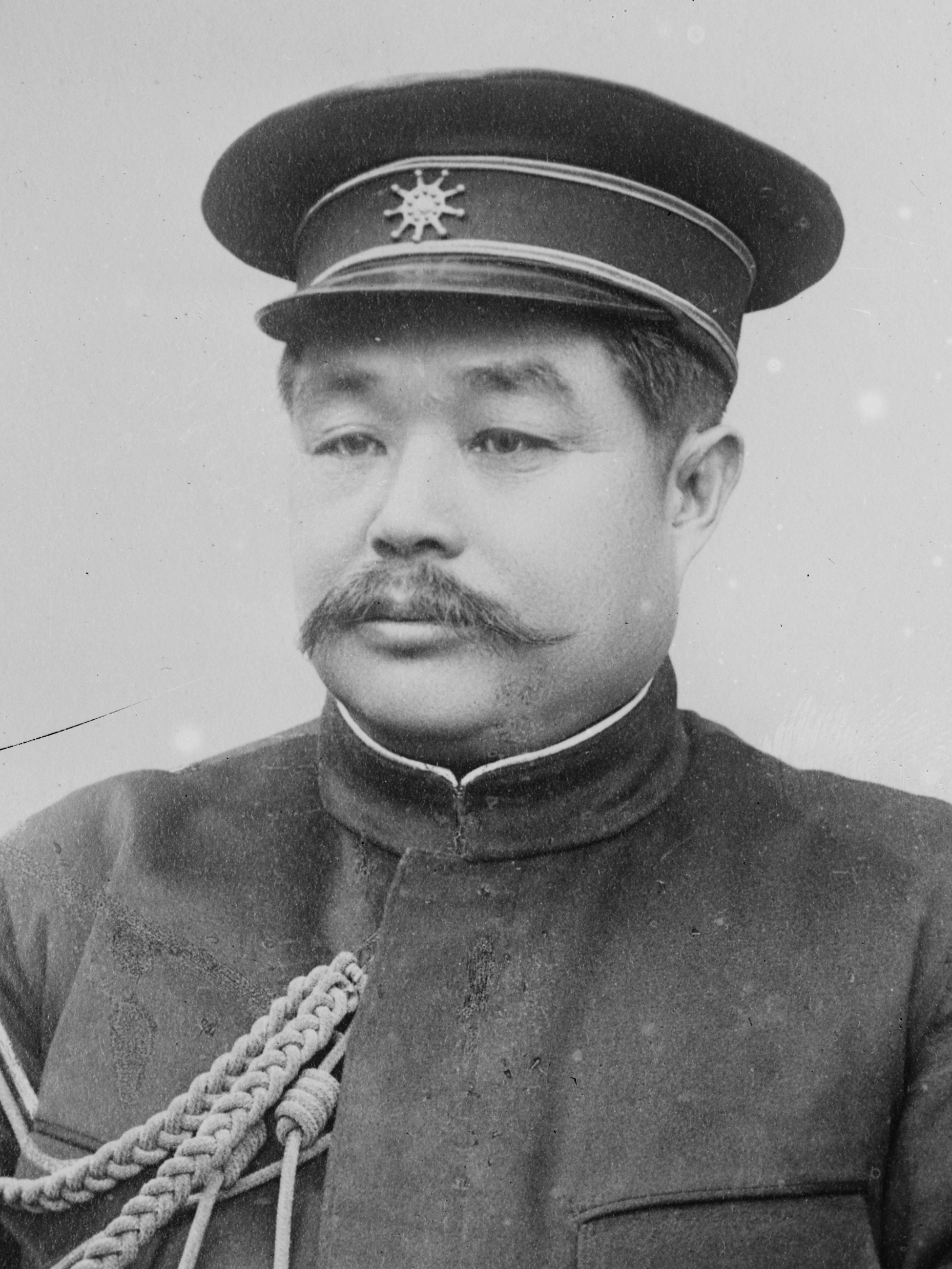
Li Yuanhong

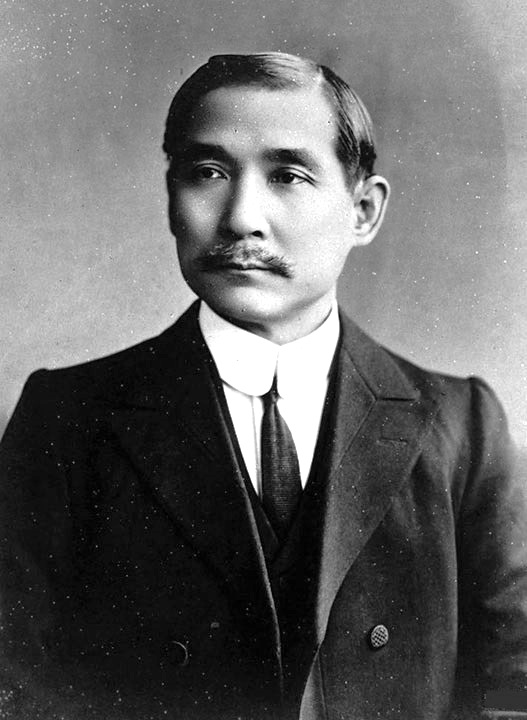
Sun yat-sen

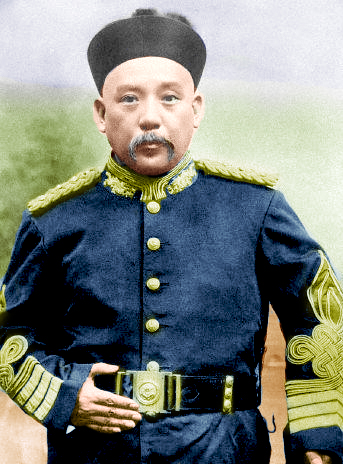
Yuan Shikai

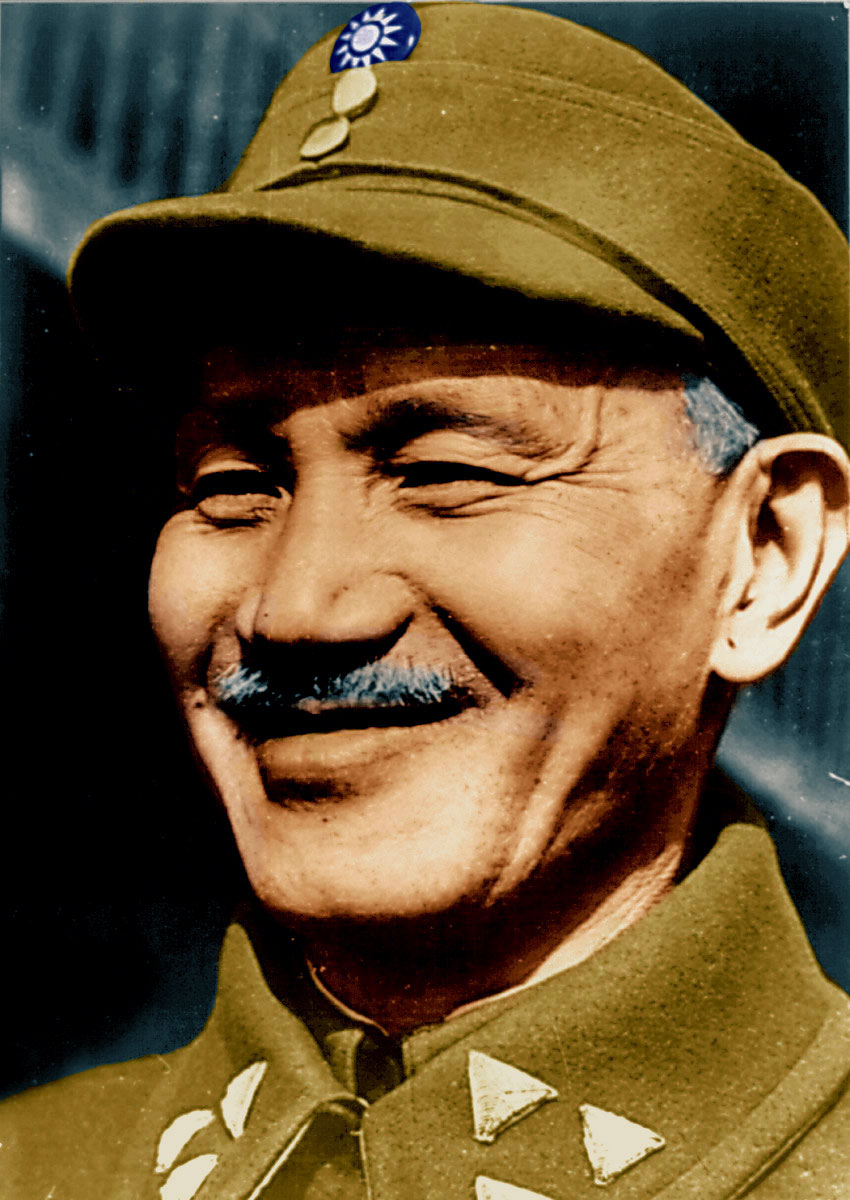
Chiang Kai-shek

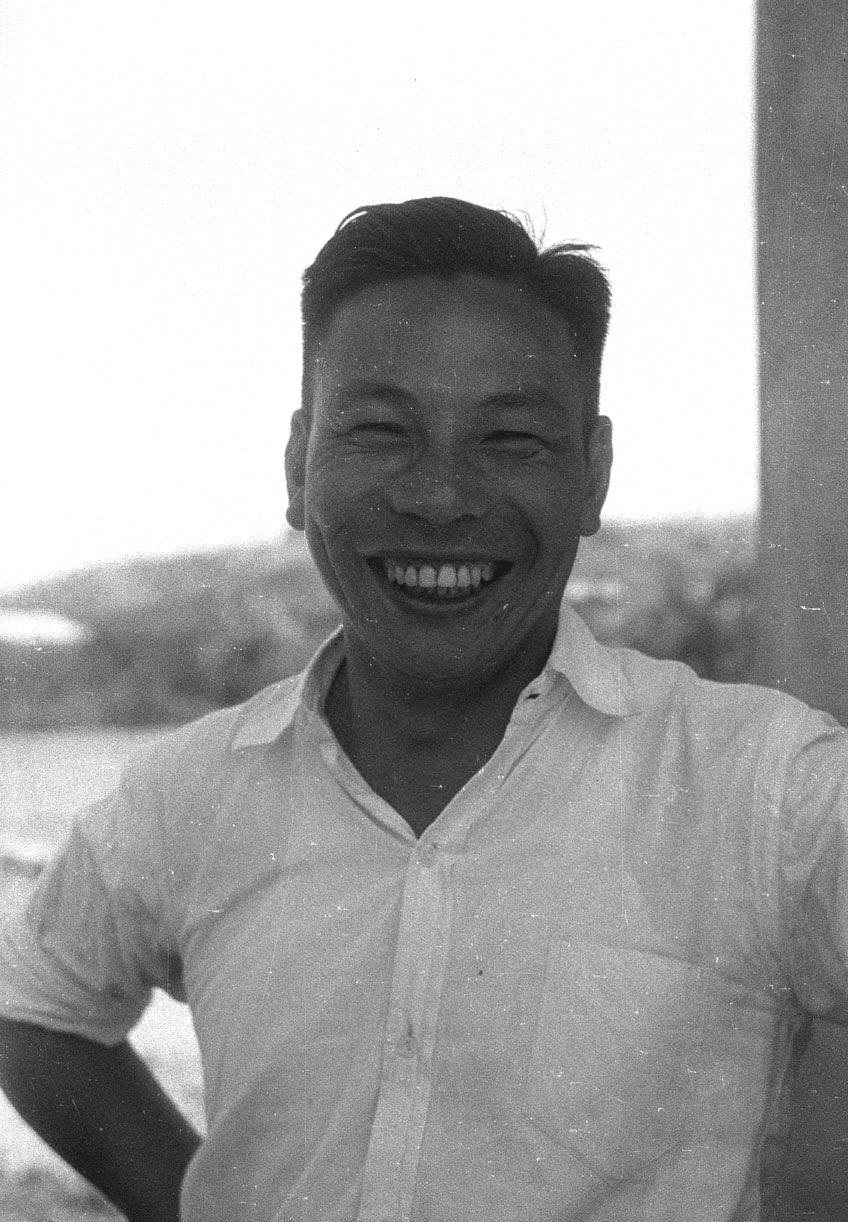
Chiang Ching-kuo

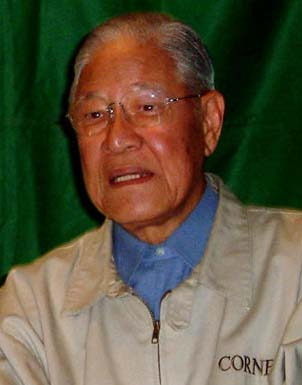
Lee Teng-hui

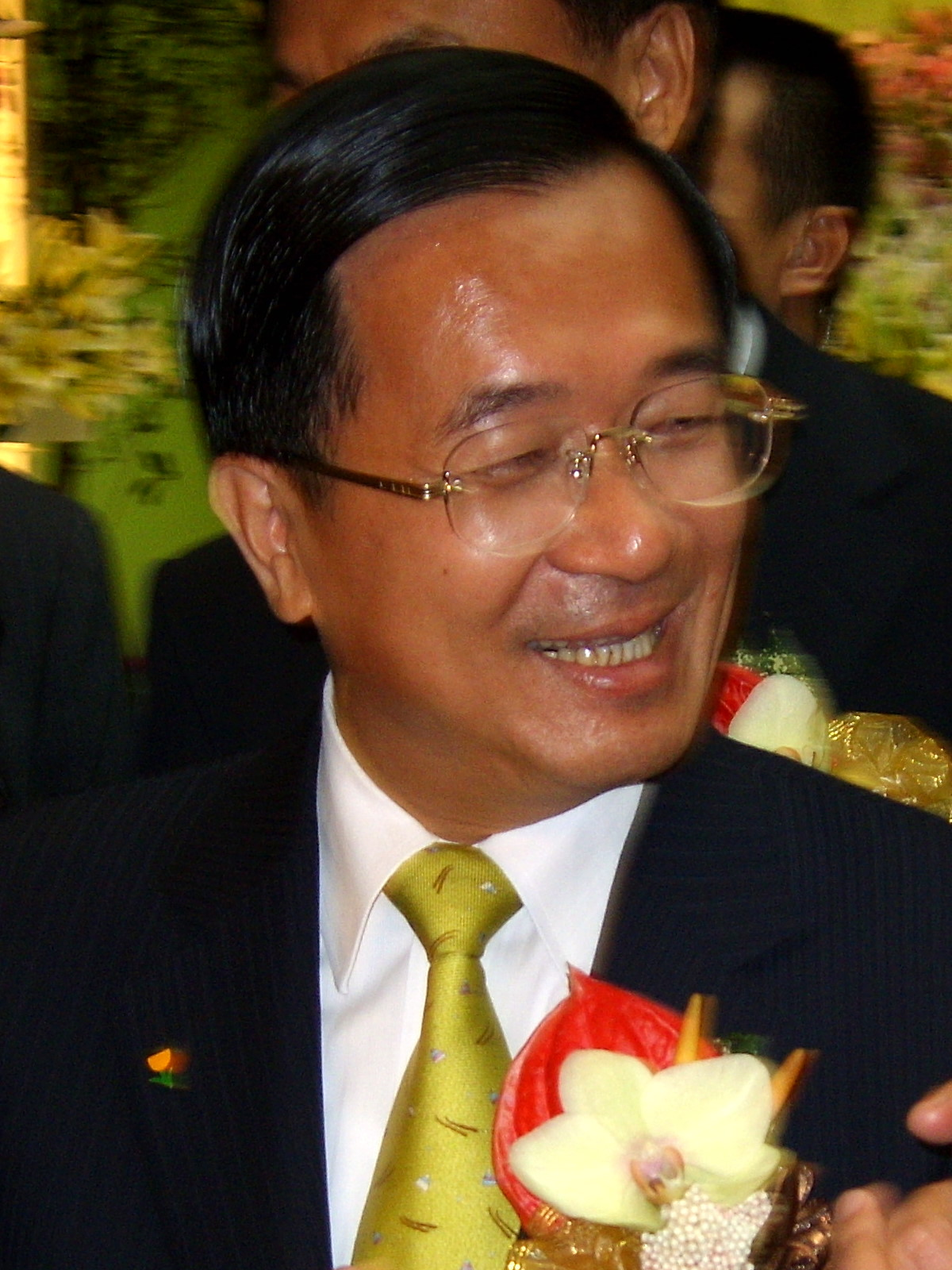
Chen Shui-bian

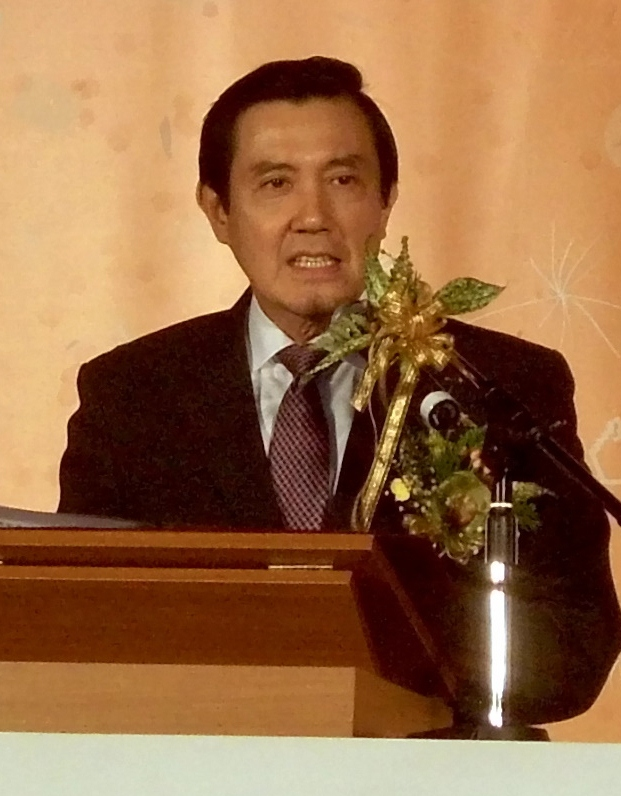
Ma Ying-jeou

Beginning with the Wuchang Uprising on 11 October 1911 and in the following two months, provincial military governments declared their independence from the Qing Empire under the name "Republic of China." On 30 November 1911, the "Central Military Government of the Republic of China" was established under the leadership of Li Yuanhong.

=== Provisional Government of the Republic of China (Nanjing, 1912; Beijing, 1912–1913) ===
Provisional President of the Republic of China (臨時大總統):

- Sun Yat-sen (1 January 1912 - 10 March 1912)
- Yuan Shikai (10 March 1912 - 10 October 1913)

The "Republic of China" was formally proclaimed on 1 January 1912 and Sun Yat-sen took office in Nanking (now Nanjing) as the first provisional president. Sun resigned on March 10 and was succeeded by Qing Empire Prime Minister Yuan Shikai. This moved the government to Beijing.

=== Government of the Republic of China (Beijing, 1913–1928) ===
Yuan Shikai enacted a new Constitution to greatly expand his powers as president and abolish the National Assembly. Sun Yat-sen and his supporters responded with the failed Second Revolution and were subsequently exiled. The later ROC governments under the KMT (and the current People's Republic of China government) considers the Beiyang Government after this point to be illegitimate.

- Yuan Shikai (10 October 1913 - 22 December 1915)

Yuan Shikai declared himself Emperor on 22 December 1915. Popular opposition led Yuan to retract his declaration on 22 March 1916.

- Yuan Shikai (22 March 1916 - 6 June 1916)
- Li Yuanhong (7 June 1916 - 1 July 1917)

Yuan died in 1916 and was succeeded by Vice President Li Yuan-hung. Warlord Zhang Xun restored Puyi to the throne for twelve days from July 1 to 12 July 1917. The Republican government was soon restored, but local warlords forced Li from office.

- Li Yuanhong (12 July 1917 - 17 July 1917)
- Feng Guozhang (17 July 1917 - 10 October 1918)
- Xu Shichang (10 October 1918 - 2 June 1922)
- Zhou Ziqi (2 Jun 1922 - 11 Jun 1922) (acting)
- Li Yuanhong (11 June 1922 - 13 June 1923)
- Zhang Shaozeng (13 Jun 1923 - 9 Sep 1923) (acting)
- Gao Lingwei (9 Sep 1923 - 10 Oct 1923) (acting)
- Cao Kun (10 October 1923 - 2 November 1924)
- Huang Fu (2 Nov 1924 - 24 Nov 1924) (acting)
- Duan Qirui (24 November 1924 - 20 April 1926)
- Hu Weide (20 Apr 1926 - 13 May 1926) (acting)
- Yan Huiqing (13 May 1926 - 22 Jun 1926) (acting)
- Du Xigui (22 Jun 1926 - 1 Oct 1926) (acting)
- Wellington Koo (1 Oct 1926 - 18 Jun 1927) (acting)
- Zhang Zuolin (18 June 1927 - 2 June 1928)

The Beiyang Government was extinguished by the Northern Expedition led by the Kuomintang.

=== Military Government (Guangzhou, 1917–1925) ===
The Chinese Revolutionary Party established a rival government in Guangzhou and declared legitimacy over the "warlord" government in Beijing (which they renamed Beiping since jing means "capital").

Generalissimo of the Military Government (海陸軍大元帥):

- Sun Yat-sen (10 September 1917 - 5 July 1918)

The Military Government was headed collectively by the Governing Committee of the Military Government (5 July 1918 - 21 August 1918), viz.,

- Sun Yat-sen
- Tang Shaoyi
- Wu Tingfang
- Cen Chunxuan
- Lu Rongting
- Tang Jiyao
- Lin Baoyi

In 1918, Sun Yat-sen and his government was forced out of Guangdong by warlords. The Military Government was consolidated by Chairman of the Governing Committee (主席總裁):

- Cen Chunxuan (21 August 1918 - 24 October 1920)

Sun Yat-sen and his supporters were restored in Guangzhou with the help of local warlord Chen Jiongming in 1920. On 24 October 1920 to 4 May 1921, figurehead duties were again given collectively to the Governing Committee of the Military Government, viz.,

- Sun Yat-sen
- Tang Shaoyi
- Wu Tingfang
- Tang Jiyao.

Sun Yat-sen was elected "President" by remnants of the 1912 National Assembly, but since this parliament lacked the quorum established by the 1912 Constitution, he took the title of Extraordinary President (非常大總統):

- Sun Yat-sen (5 May 1921 - 29 June 1922)

In 1922, Sun was expelled from Guangdong by Chen Jiongming.

Sun Yat-sen was restored in Guangdong in 1923 and established the National Government with the help of the Comintern.

Generalissimo of the Military Government (海陸軍大元帥):

- Sun Yat-sen (2 March 1923 - 12 March 1925)

Sun died in 1925 and was succeeded as acting Generalissimo of the National Government by Hu Hanmin.

- Hu Hanmin (12 March 1925 - 1 July 1925) (acting)

=== National Government (Guangzhou, 1925–1927) ===
Chairmen of the National Government (國民政府主席):

- Wang Jingwei (1 July 1925 - 15 April 1926)

Wang Ching-wei was forced out of office over the attempted kidnapping of Chiang Kai-shek in the Zhongshan Gunboat Incident.

- Tan Yankai (16 April 1926 - 29 March 1927)

In 1927, the Kuomintang embarked on the Northern Expedition and left its base in Guangzhou for Wuhan, Nanjing, and Shanghai in three separate divisions.

=== National Government (Wuhan, 1927) ===
During the Northern Expedition, Wang Ching-wei declared Wuhan to be the capital of the Republic of China after the city's capture by National Revolutionary Army forces loyal to the KMT left-wing.

Chairmen of the Standing Committee of the National Government:

- Wang Jingwei (20 March 1927 - 13 September 1927)

=== National Government (Nanjing, 1927–1937; Chongqing, 1937–1945; Nanjing, 1945–1947) ===
Chiang Kai-shek declared the capital of the Republic of China to be in Nanjing after the city's capture by National Revolutionary Army forces loyal to the KMT right-wing during the Northern Expedition.

Chairmen of the Standing Committee of the National Government:

- Chiang Kai-shek (18 April 1927 - 15 August 1927)
- Tan Yankai (15 August 1927 - 10 October 1928)

The leftist government in Wuhan was overwhelmed by local warlords and agreed to join the Nationalist Government in Nanjing in September 1928.

Chairmen of the National Government (國民政府主席):

- Chiang Kai-shek (10 October 1928 - 15 December 1931)
- Lin Sen (15 December 1931 - 1 August 1943)

The National Government relocated to Chongqing from 1937 to 1945 due to the Japanese invasion.

- Chiang Kai-shek (1 August 1943 - 20 May 1948)

=== Provisional National Government (Beijing, 1937–1940) ===
The Provisional National Government was established as a Japanese collaborationist government established under occupation. Acting Chairman of the Provisional National Government:

- Wang Kemin (14 December 1937 - 30 March 1940)

=== Reformed National Government (Nanjing, 1938–1940) ===
The Reformed National Government was established as a Japanese collaborationist government established under occupation. Acting Chairman of the Reformed National Government:

- Liang Hongzhi (28 March 1938 - 30 March 1940)

=== National Government (Nanjing, 1940–1945) ===
A National Government, as a challenge to the legitimacy of Chiang Kai-shek's National Government in Chongqing, was established as a Japanese collaborationist government established under occupation. As evidence of its claims to legitimacy, the government in Nanjing established the same set of institutions as the one in Chongqing and flew an almost-identical flag. This replaced the Provisional and Reformed National Governments. Chairmen of the National Government (國民政府主席):

- Wang Jingwei (30 March 1940 - 10 November 1944)
- Chen Gongbo (20 Nov 1944 - Aug 1945) (acting)

=== Constitutional Government (Nanjing, 1947–1949; Guangzhou/Chongqing/Chengdu, 1949; Taipei, 1949–present) ===
A new constitution was promulgated on 25 December 1947 and Chiang Kai-shek was subsequently elected President by the National Assembly.

President of the Republic of China (中華民國總統):

- Chiang Kai-shek (20 May 1948 - 21 January 1949)
- Li Zongren (January 21, 1949 - March 1, 1950) (acting)

Chiang Kai-shek resigned amid losses in the Chinese Civil War. The government moved from Nanjing to Guangzhou, then to Chongqing and finally Chengdu before arriving to Taipei on 8 December 1949. Li Zongren had left for the United States in November 1949 and Chiang officially resumed his powers in March 1950. This regime remained the internationally recognized true government of China with sovereignty throughout mainland China, Taiwan, Tibet Area, Sinkiang and Outer Mongolia until recognition shifted to the People's Republic of China by the United Nations in 1971 and the United States in 1979.

- Chiang Kai-shek (1 March 1950 - 5 April 1975) (first to fifth terms)
- Yen Chia-kan (6 April 1975 - 20 May 1978) (fifth term)
- Chiang Ching-kuo (20 May 1978 - 13 January 1988) (sixth and seventh terms)
- Lee Teng-hui (13 January 1988 - 20 May 1996) (seventh and eighth terms)

Starting from the ninth term the president is elected by popular vote among citizens of the Republic of China in the "Free Area of the Republic of China" (area under de facto Republic of China administration), instead of by the National Assembly.

- Lee Teng-hui (20 May 1996 - 20 May 2000) (ninth term)
- Chen Shui-bian (20 May 2000 - 20 May 2008) (tenth and eleventh terms)
- Ma Ying-Jeou (20 May 2008 – 20 May 2016) (twelfth and thirteenth terms)
- Tsai Ing-wen (20 May 2016 – 20 May 2024) (fourteenth and fifteenth terms)
- Lai Ching-te (20 May 2024 – present) (sixteenth term)

== See also ==
- President of the Republic of China
- List of presidents of the Republic of China
- Premier of the Republic of China
- History of the Republic of China
- Timeline of Taiwanese history
