= 1926 in China =

- Decades: 1900s; 1910s; 1920s; 1930s; 1940s
- See also: Other events of 1926; History of China • Timeline • Years

== Incumbents ==
- President:
  - until April 20: Duan Qirui
  - April 20 – May 13: Hu Weide
  - May 13 – June 22: Yan Huiqing
  - June 22 – October 1: Du Xigui
  - starting October 1: Koo Vi-kyuin
- Premier:
  - until March 4: Xu Shiying
  - March 4 – April 20: Jia Deyao
  - April 20 – May 13: Hu Weide
  - May 13 – June 22: Yan Huiqing
  - June 22 – October 1: Du Xigui
  - starting October 1: Wellington Koo

== Events ==
- March 12 – Japanese warship bombards the Taku Forts, killing several Guominjun troops guarding the forts. Guominjun troops fired back in retaliation and drive the warship out of the Tanggu harbor.
- March 16 – Ambassadors representing eight countries that were signatory nations to the Boxer Protocol send an ultimatum to the Beiyang Government under Duan Qirui, demanding that the Duan government destroy all defense establishments on the Taku Forts.
- March 18 – March 18 Massacre in Beijing.
- April – Guominjun ousts Duan Qirui's government and releases the deposed ex-president Cao Kun to appease the Zhili clique. Conclusion of Anti-Fengtian War.
- June – Chiang Kai-shek became the Commander-in-Chief of the National Revolutionary Army
- July 9 – KMT launches Northern Expedition.
- October – Conclusion of the Canton-Hong Kong strike.
- October 16 – Explosion of ammunition on the Chinese troopship Kuang Yuang, near Kiukiang, China

== Births ==
=== January ===
- January 19 — Wang Hai, fighter pilot and general (d. 2020)

=== March ===
- March 12 — Huang Xuhua, mechanical engineer (d. 2025)
- Buhe, 5th Chairman of Inner Mongolia (d. 2017)

=== April ===
- April 2 — Tian Chengren, actor (d. 2020)

=== June ===
- June 26 — Gu Fangzhou, virologist (d. 2019)

=== August ===
- August 11 — John Gokongwei, Chinese-Filipino billionaire businessman and philanthropist (d. 2019)
- August 16 — Yu Min, prominent nuclear physicist (d. 2019)
- August 17 — Jiang Zemin, 4th Paramount Leader of China (d. 2022)

=== September ===
- September 10 — Dai Yi, historian (d. 2024)
- September 23 — Chen Wenxin, biologist (d. 2021)
- September 28 — Zou Jiahua, member of the 14th Politburo of the Chinese Communist Party (d. 2025)

=== October ===
- October 26 — Li Leishi, rebak specialist (d. 2010)

=== November ===
- November 3 — Qi Xin, author and the mother of the 6th Chinese paramount leader Xi Jinping
- November 24 — Tsung-Dao Lee, Chinese-American physicist (d. 2024)

=== December ===
- December 1 — Yang Rudai, member of the 13th Politburo of the Chinese Communist Party (d. 2018)
- December 19 — Wang Wenjuan, Yue opera performer (d. 2021)

== Deaths ==
- January 10 — Ying Lianzhi, journalist and educator (b. 1867)
- April 26 — Shao Piaoping, journalist, author and political activist (b. 1886)
- August 24 — Zhang Jian, entrepreneur, politician and educator (b. 1853)

== See also ==
Warlord Era
