= 1923 in China =

- Decades: 1900s; 1910s; 1920s; 1930s; 1940s
- See also: Other events of 1923; History of China • Timeline • Years

Events in the year 1923 in China.

== Incumbents ==
- President: Li Yuanhong (until 13 June), Gao Lingwei (14 June – 10 October), Cao Kun (from 10 October)
- Premier: Wang Zhengting (until 4 January), Zhang Shaozeng (4 January – 9 September), Gao Lingwei (from 9 September)

== Events ==
- January – Establishment of Radio Corporation of China
- 26 January – Sun–Joffe Manifesto
- 5 October – presidential election
- 27 December – Establishment of the Prefecture Apostolic of Tingchow
- Establishment of the 3rd Central Executive Committee of the Chinese Communist Party
- Establishment of First United Front
- Establishment of Jiangsu Tongzhou High School, in Nantong, Jiangsu
- Establishment of Kunming Wujiaba International Airport, in Kunming, Yunnan

== Births ==
- Chen Nengkuan
- Fu Quanxiang
- Li Wanheng
- Li Yuan-tsu
- Wang Shufeng
- Yang Guanghua
- Yang Jingyuan

== Deaths ==
- Zhou Ziqi
- Chen Xiefen
- Fang Junying (1884–1923), was a Chinese revolutionary, killed herself due to sorrow over the level of corruption in the government
