= List of presidents of the Republic of China =

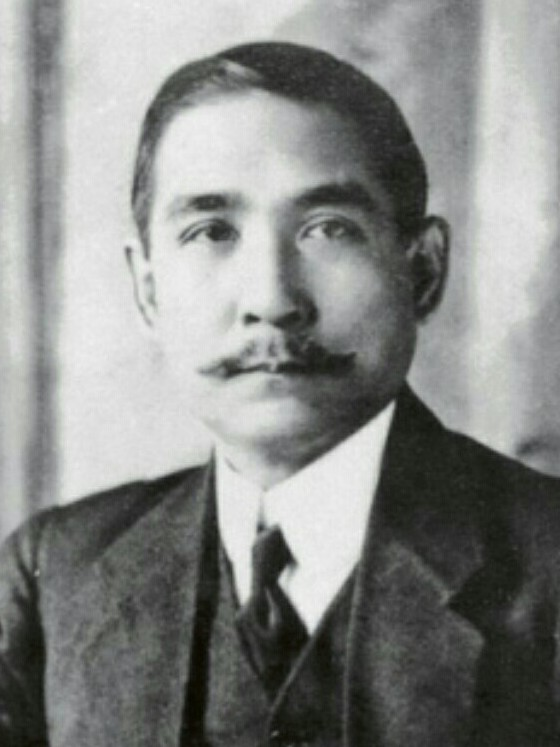
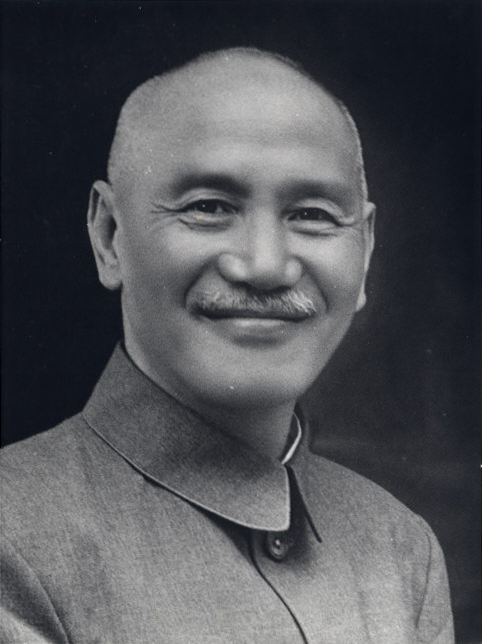
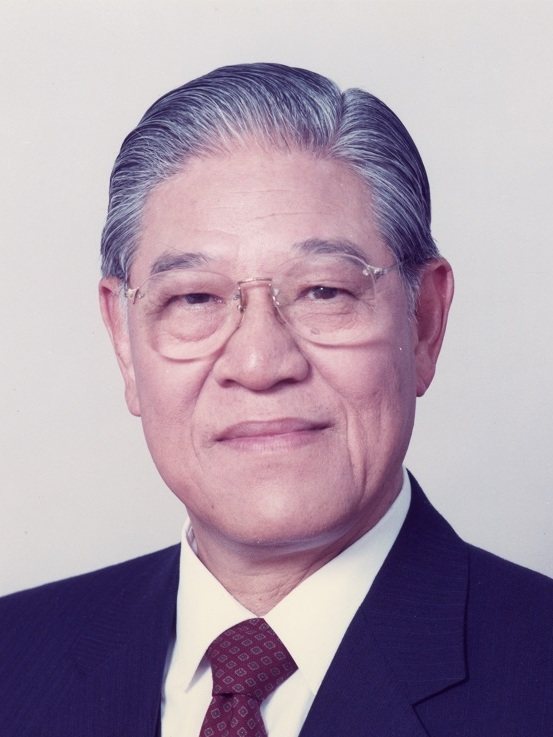
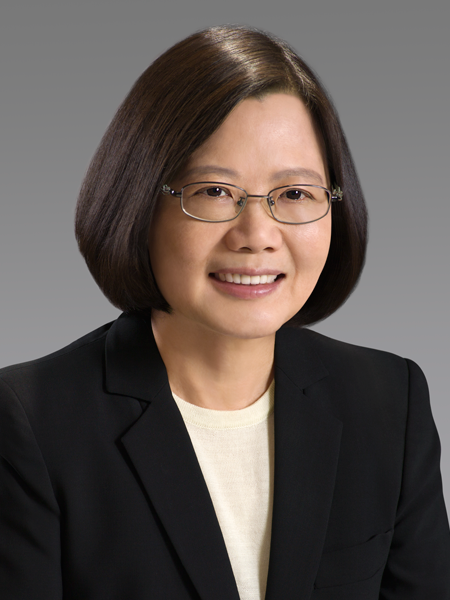
- Top left: Sun Yat-sen was the first President of the Provisional Government.
- Top right: Chiang Kai-shek was the first President under the 1947 Constitution.
- Bottom left: Lee Teng-hui was the first President directly elected by popular vote.
- Bottom right: Tsai Ing-wen was the first female President.

This is a list of the presidents of the Republic of China.

The Republic of China controlled Mainland China before 1949. In the fall of 1949, the ROC government retreated to Taiwan and surrounding islands as a result of the takeover of the mainland by the Chinese Communist Party and founding of the People's Republic of China. Since 1949, the Republic of China, now commonly known as "Taiwan", has only controlled Taiwan and nearby islands. Martial law ended in Taiwan in 1987 and direct elections were introduced in 1996.

The official name of the office in Chinese has changed as follows:

Year	Chinese	Mandarin Pinyin	Taiwanese Pe̍h-ōe-jī	Hakka Pha̍k-fa-sṳ	English Translation
1912–1928	大總統	Dàzǒngtǒng	Tōa-chóng-thóng	Thai-chúng-thúng	Great President
1928–1947	國民政府主席	Guómín Zhèngfǔ Zhǔxí	Kok-bîn Chèng-hú Chú-se̍k	Koet-mìn Chṳn-fú Chú-si̍t	Chairman of the Nationalist Government (Note: Alternatively translated as "President of the National Government" on occasions of formality in various historical sources.)
1947–present	總統	Zǒngtǒng	Chóng-thóng	Chúng-thúng	President

== List ==
Provisional Government:
Tongmenghui
Beiyang clique, etc.
Beiyang Government:
Beiyang clique, etc. Progressive Party/Research Clique Communications Clique
Nationalist to Constitutional Government:
Kuomintang Democratic Progressive Party

=== Presidents of the Provisional Government ===
No.	Portrait	Name (Birth–Death)	Term of office		Political party	Vice President	Assembly (elected)
1		Sun Yat-sen 孫中山 (1866–1925)	1 January 1912	10 March 1912	Tongmenghui	Li Yuanhong (Independent)	Provisional (1911)
2		Yuan Shikai 袁世凱 (1859–1916)	10 March 1912	10 October 1913	Beiyang clique	Li Yuanhong (Independent)	Provisional (1912)
=== Presidents of the Beiyang Government ===
No.	Portrait	Name (Birth–Death)	Term of office		Political party	Vice President	Assembly (elected)
1		Yuan Shikai 袁世凱 (1859–1916)	10 October 1913	6 June 1916 (Note: Proclaimed a new empire from 12 December 1915 to 22 March 1916.) (Note: Died in office.)	Beiyang clique	Li Yuanhong (Progressive)	1st (1913)
2		Li Yuanhong 黎元洪 (1864–1928)	7 June 1916	17 July 1917 (Note: Zhang Xun briefly restored the Qing Empire from 1 July to 12 July in 1917.) (Note: Forced out of office.)	Progressive Party	Feng Guozhang (Zhili clique)	1st (1913)
—		Feng Guozhang 馮國璋 (1859–1919) (acting) (Note: As Vice President.)	17 July 1917	10 October 1918	Zhili clique	Vacant	1st (1913)
3		Xu Shichang 徐世昌 (1855–1939)	10 October 1918	2 June 1922	Anhui clique (Anfu Club)	Vacant	2nd (1918)
—		Zhou Ziqi 周自齊 (1871–1923) (acting) (Note: As Acting Premier.)	2 June 1922	11 June 1922	Communications Clique	Vacant	2nd (1918)
(2)		Li Yuanhong 黎元洪 (1864–1928)	11 June 1922	13 June 1923	Research Clique	Vacant	2nd (1918)
—		Gao Lingwei 高凌霨 (1868–1939) (acting) (Note: As Premier.)	14 June 1923	10 October 1923	Zhili clique	Vacant	2nd (1918)
4		Cao Kun 曹錕 (1862–1938)	10 October 1923	2 November 1924	Zhili clique	Vacant	(1923)
—		Huang Fu 黃郛 (1883–1936) (acting)	2 November 1924	24 November 1924	Political Science Clique	Vacant	(1923)
5		Duan Qirui (Note: Provisional Chief Executive instead of President.) 段祺瑞 (1865–1936)	24 November 1924	20 April 1926	Anhui clique (Anfu Club)	Vacant	(1923)
5		Duan Qirui 段祺瑞 (1865–1936)	24 November 1924	20 April 1926	Anhui clique (Anfu Club)	Vacant	Vacant
—		Hu Weide (Note: Acting Provisional Chief Executive instead of Acting President.) 胡惟德 (1863–1933) (acting)	20 April 1926	13 May 1926	Zhili clique	Vacant	Vacant
—		Yan Huiqing (W.W. Yan) 顏惠慶 (1877–1950) (acting)	13 May 1926	22 June 1926	Nonpartisan	Vacant	Vacant
—		Du Xigui 杜錫珪 (1875–1933) (acting)	22 June 1926	1 October 1926	Zhili clique	Vacant	Vacant
—		V. K. Wellington Koo 顧維鈞 (1888–1985) (acting)	1 October 1926	17 June 1927 (Note: Resigned.)	Nonpartisan	Vacant	Vacant
6		Zhang Zuolin (Note: Zhang was the Generalissimo of the Beiyang Military Government instead of President.) 張作霖 (1875–1928)	18 June 1927	4 June 1928 (Note: Assassinated.)	Fengtian clique	Vacant	Vacant
=== Chairman of the Nationalist Government === Note:
No.	Portrait	Name (Note: The Chairman of the Nationalist Government (國民政府) was the head of state in this period (political tutelage; 訓政時期). There was no office of Vice Chairman.) (Birth–Death)	Term of office		Political party	Assembly (elected)	
1		Tan Yankai 譚延闓 (1880–1930)	7 February 1928	10 October 1928	Kuomintang	2nd National Congress of Kuomintang (4th plenum)	
2		Chiang Kai-shek 蔣中正 (1887–1975)	10 October 1928	15 December 1931	Kuomintang	2nd National Congress of Kuomintang (5th plenum)	
—		Lin Sen 林森 (1868–1943)	15 December 1931 (Note: Assumed office as acting chairman from 15 December 1931 to 1 January 1932.)	1 August 1943	Kuomintang	2nd National Congress of Kuomintang (5th plenum)	
3		Lin Sen 林森 (1868–1943)	15 December 1931	1 August 1943	Kuomintang	4th National Congress of Kuomintang (1st plenum)	
—		Chiang Kai-shek 蔣中正 (1887–1975)	1 August 1943 (Note: Assumed office as acting chairman from 1 June to 1o October 1943.)	20 May 1948	Kuomintang	4th National Congress of Kuomintang (1st plenum)	
4		Chiang Kai-shek 蔣中正 (1887–1975)	1 August 1943	20 May 1948	Kuomintang	5th National Congress of Kuomintang (11th plenum)	
=== Presidents after the 1947 Constitution ===
No.	Portrait	Name (Birth–Death)	Term of office		Political party	Vice President	Term (elected)
1		Chiang Kai-shek 蔣中正 (1887–1975)	20 May 1948	21 January 1949 (Note: Declared incapacity.)	Kuomintang	Li Zongren (Kuomintang)	1 (1948)
—		Li Zongren 李宗仁 (1890–1969) (acting)	21 January 1949	20 November 1949	Kuomintang	Vacant	1 (1948)
—		Yan Xishan 閻錫山 (1883–1960) (acting)	20 November 1949	1 March 1950	Kuomintang	Vacant	1 (1948)
(1)		Chiang Kai-shek 蔣中正 (1887–1975)	1 March 1950	5 April 1975	Kuomintang	Li Zongren (Note: Vice-President from 1948 to 1954; impeached and recalled in 1954.) (Kuomintang)	1 (1948)
(1)		Chiang Kai-shek 蔣中正 (1887–1975)	1 March 1950	5 April 1975	Kuomintang	Vacant	1 (1948)
(1)		Chiang Kai-shek 蔣中正 (1887–1975)	1 March 1950	5 April 1975	Kuomintang	Chen Cheng (Note: Died on 5 March 1965.) (Kuomintang)	2 (1954)
(1)		Chiang Kai-shek 蔣中正 (1887–1975)	1 March 1950	5 April 1975	Kuomintang	Chen Cheng (Kuomintang)	3 (1960)
(1)		Chiang Kai-shek 蔣中正 (1887–1975)	1 March 1950	5 April 1975	Kuomintang	Vacant	3 (1960)
(1)		Chiang Kai-shek 蔣中正 (1887–1975)	1 March 1950	5 April 1975	Kuomintang	Yen Chia-kan (Kuomintang)	4 (1966)
(1)		Chiang Kai-shek 蔣中正 (1887–1975)	1 March 1950	5 April 1975	Kuomintang	Yen Chia-kan (Kuomintang)	5 (1972)
2		Yen Chia-kan (C. K. Yen) 嚴家淦 (1905–1993)	5 April 1975	20 May 1978	Kuomintang	Vacant	5 (1972)
3		Chiang Ching-kuo 蔣經國 (1910–1988)	20 May 1978	13 January 1988	Kuomintang	Hsieh Tung-min (Kuomintang)	6 (1978)
3		Chiang Ching-kuo 蔣經國 (1910–1988)	20 May 1978	13 January 1988	Kuomintang	Lee Teng-hui (Kuomintang)	7 (1984)
4		Lee Teng-hui 李登輝 (1923–2020)	13 January 1988	20 May 2000	Kuomintang	Vacant	7 (1984)
4		Lee Teng-hui 李登輝 (1923–2020)	13 January 1988	20 May 2000	Kuomintang	Lee Yuan-tsu (Kuomintang)	8 (1990)
4		Lee Teng-hui 李登輝 (1923–2020)	13 January 1988	20 May 2000	Kuomintang	Lien Chan (Kuomintang)	9 (1996)
5		Chen Shui-bian 陳水扁 (born 1950)	20 May 2000	20 May 2008	Democratic Progressive	Annette Lu (DPP)	10 (2000)
5		Chen Shui-bian 陳水扁 (born 1950)	20 May 2000	20 May 2008	Democratic Progressive	Annette Lu (DPP)	11 (2004)
6		Ma Ying-jeou 馬英九 (born 1950)	20 May 2008	20 May 2016	Kuomintang	Vincent Siew (Kuomintang)	12 (2008)
6		Ma Ying-jeou 馬英九 (born 1950)	20 May 2008	20 May 2016	Kuomintang	Wu Den-yih (Kuomintang)	13 (2012)
7		Tsai Ing-wen 蔡英文 (born 1956)	20 May 2016	20 May 2024	Democratic Progressive	Chen Chien-jen (Independent)	14 (2016)
7		Tsai Ing-wen 蔡英文 (born 1956)	20 May 2016	20 May 2024	Democratic Progressive	Lai Ching-te (DPP)	15 (2020)
8		Lai Ching-te 賴清德 (born 1959)	20 May 2024	Incumbent	Democratic Progressive	Hsiao Bi-khim (DPP)	16 (2024)

== Presidential age-related data (post-1947 Constitution) ==
Key:

Dead
Living
Incumbent

#	President	Born	Age at start of presidency	Age at end of presidency	Post-presidency timespan	Lifespan	
#	President	Born	Age at start of presidency	Age at end of presidency	Post-presidency timespan	Died	Age
1	Chiang Kai-shek	Oct 31, 1887	60 years, 202 days May 20, 1948	87 years, 156 days Apr 5, 1975	(died in office)	Apr 5, 1975	87 years, 156 days
2	Yen Chia-kan	Oct 23, 1905	69 years, 165 days Apr 6, 1975	72 years, 209 days May 20, 1978	15 years, 218 days	Dec 24, 1993	88 years, 62 days
3	Chiang Ching-kuo	Apr 27, 1910	68 years, 23 days May 20, 1978	77 years, 261 days Jan 13, 1988	(died in office)	Jan 13, 1988	77 years, 261 days
4	Lee Teng-hui	Jan 15, 1923	64 years, 363 days Jan 13, 1988	77 years, 126 days May 20, 2000	21 years, 71 days	Jul 30, 2020	97 years, 197 days
5	Chen Shui-bian	Oct 12, 1950	49 years, 221 days May 20, 2000	57 years, 221 days May 20, 2008	18 years, 165 days	(living)	76 years, 20 days
6	Ma Ying-jeou	Jul 13, 1950	57 years, 312 days May 20, 2008	65 years, 312 days May 20, 2016	10 years, 165 days	(living)	76 years, 111 days
7	Tsai Ing-wen	Aug 31, 1956	59 years, 263 days May 20, 2016	67 years, 263 days May 20, 2024	2 years, 165 days	(living)	70 years, 62 days
8	Lai Ching-te	Oct 6, 1959	64 years, 227 days May 20, 2024	(incumbent)	(incumbent)	(living)	67 years, 26 days

=== Oldest living ===
Green text and an asterisk mark the inauguration date of a president older than any living ex-president. Other dates are the deaths of the then-oldest president.

President	Date range	Age at start	Age at end	Time span
Chiang Kai-shek	May 20, 1948* – April 5, 1975	60 years, 202 days	87 years, 156 days	26 years, 320 days
Yen Chia-kan	April 6, 1975* – December 24, 1993	69 years, 165 days	88 years, 62 days	18 years, 262 days
Lee Teng-hui	December 24, 1993 – July 30, 2020	70 years, 343 days	97 years, 197 days	26 years, 219 days
Ma Ying-jeou	July 30, 2020 – present	70 years, 17 days	(living)	6 years, 94 days

=== Graphical representation ===
This is a graphical lifespan timeline of the presidents of the Republic of China (post-1947 Constitution) and they are listed in order of office.

The following chart shows presidents by their age (living presidents in green), with the years of their presidency in blue.

== Gallery ==
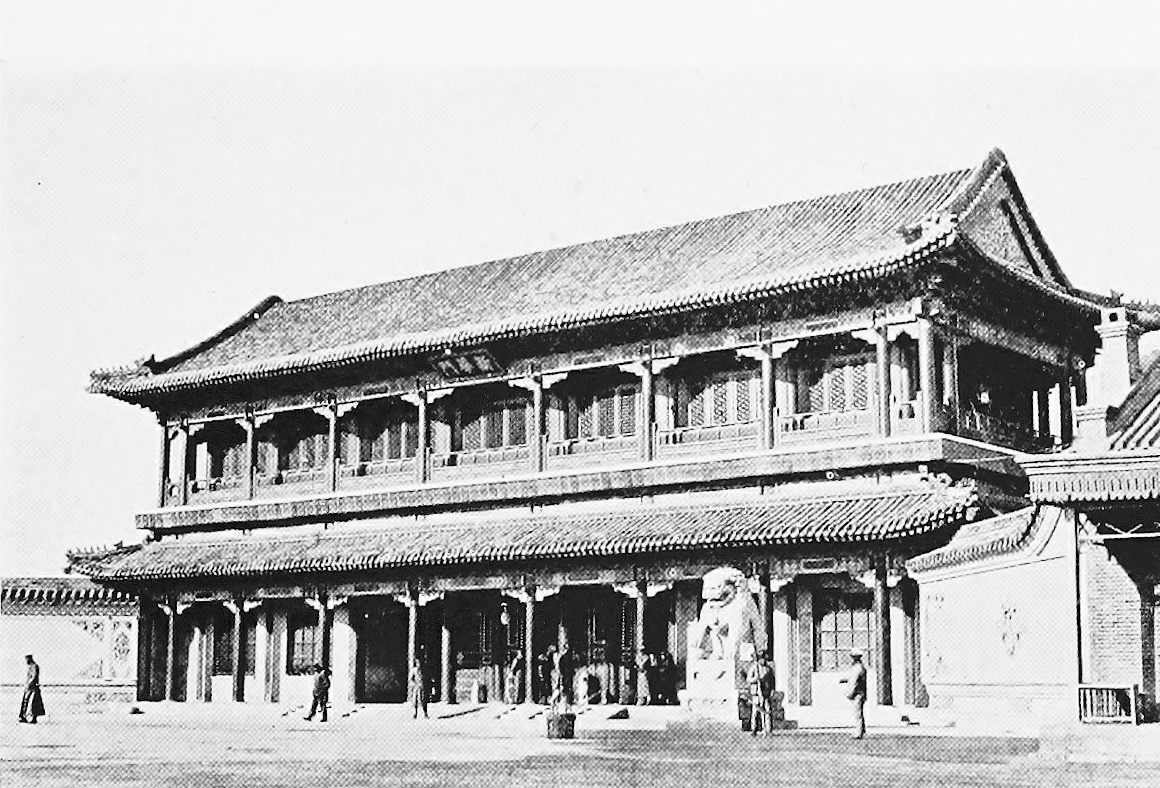
Presidential Office of the Beiyang government (1912–1928) in Beijing

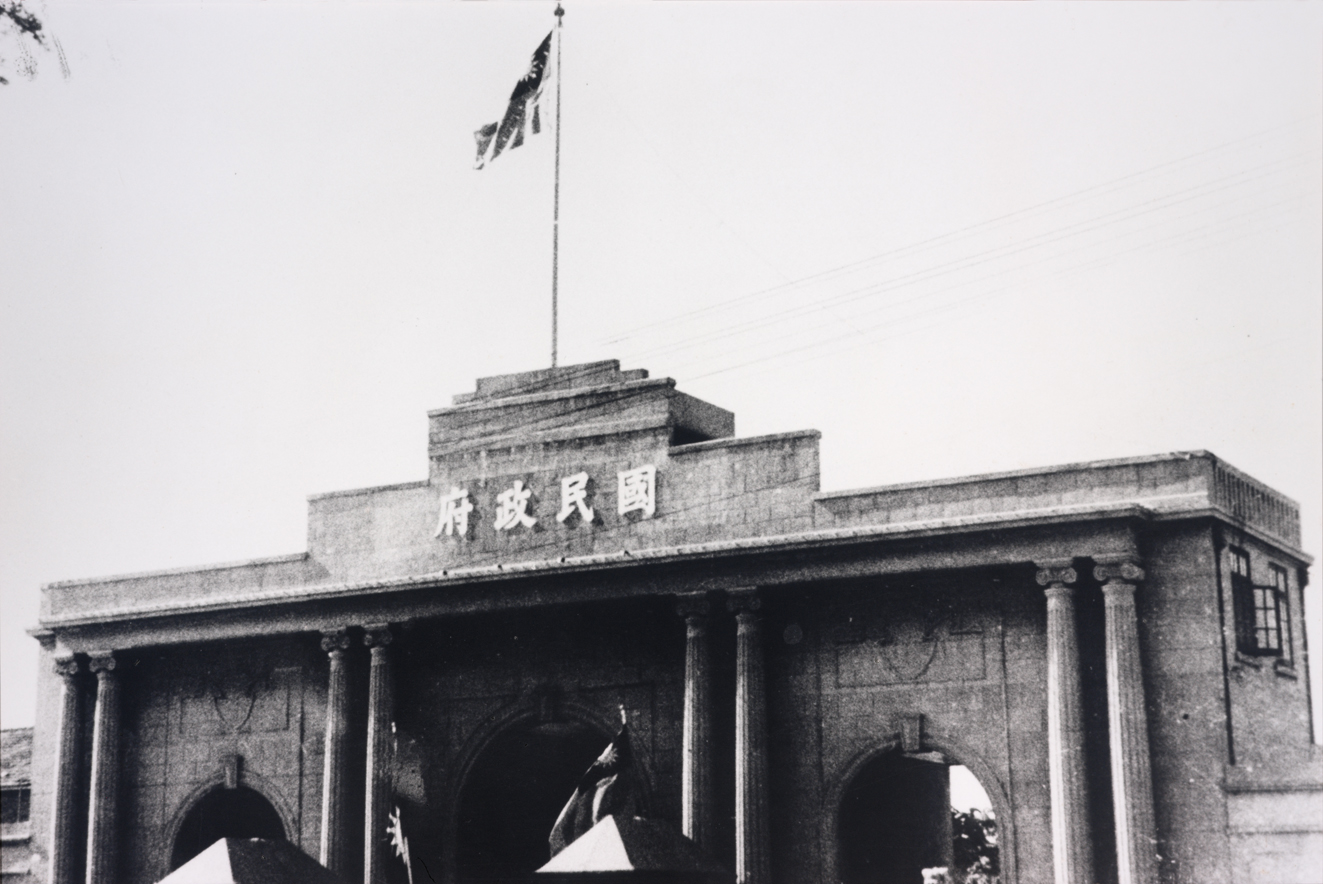
Presidential Office (occ. 1928–1937, 1946–1949) of the Nationalist government (1928–1948) and the Government of the Republic of China (1948–current) in Nanjing

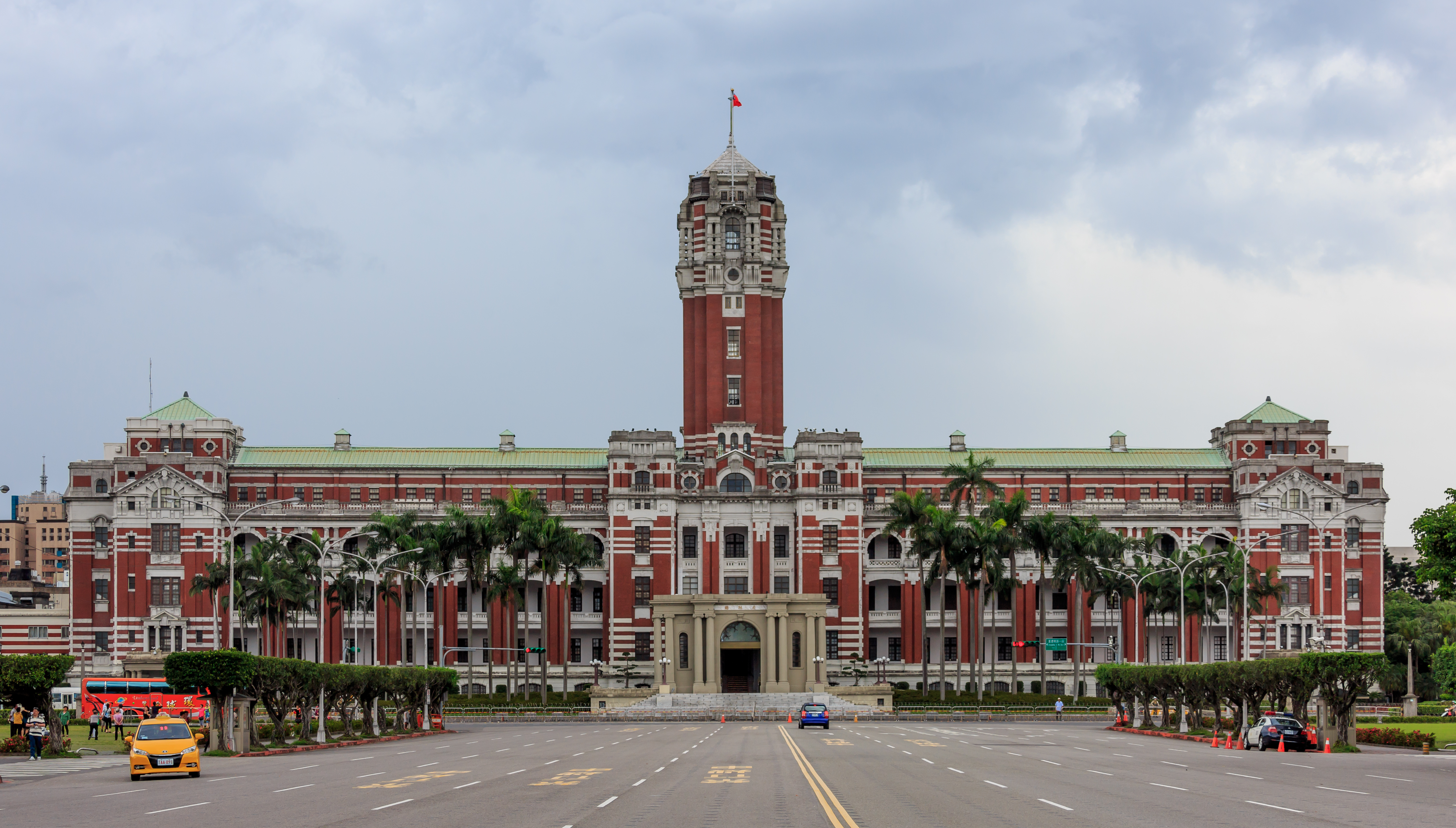
Presidential Office (occ. 1950–current) of the Government of the Republic of China (1948–current) in Taipei

== See also ==
- List of presidents of the Republic of China by other offices held
- List of vice presidents of the Republic of China
- List of premiers of the Republic of China
- President of the Legislative Yuan
- List of presidents of the Judicial Yuan
- List of presidents of the Control Yuan
- List of presidents of the Examination Yuan
- List of rulers of Taiwan
- List of political office-holders of the Republic of China by age
