= Premier Zhou =

Premier Zhou may refer to:

- Zhou Enlai (1898–1976), 1st Premier of the People's Republic of China
- Zhou Ziqi (1869–1923), Acting Premier of the Republic of China
