= Tom Kim Yung =

Qing Chinese military official (1858–1903)

Tom Kim Yung (譚錦鏞) (1858–1903) was a third ranked Wu Jinshi (武進士) of 1898, and one of the Qing Guangxu Emperor's bodyguards. He arrived in Washington with the new Chinese Minister Liu Cheng on March 26, 1903, as a military attache of the Chinese Legation at Washington.

== Death ==
On September 10, 1903, Tom was arrested near the Chinese Consulate by Police Officers John H. Kramer and Joseph Brodt. He faced charges of battery and committing an indecent act and was subsequently released on bail.

On the afternoon of September 14, 1903, after missing dinner, Tom was discovered in a room with two gas jets left open. He had a faint heartbeat when initially found, but a doctor who arrived later confirmed his death. Tom left few letters to his family and friends, and expressed his deep disgrace over the arrest and the insult he suffered at the hands of the police. In the letter, he indicated that the unjust accusation had severely damaged his reputation, which he could not endure.

After his death, Tom's family hosted a large-scale traditional Chinese funeral for him in the Consulate on September 23. Part of the funeral was recorded as a short film.

=== Effect and investigation ===
Tom's death garnered significant attention from both the Chinese and U.S. governments. Chew Tszchi, the First Secretary of the Chinese Legation, arrived on September 27, 1903, to conduct an investigation, backed by credentials from the State Department. Chew mentioned that as a diplomatic personnel, Tom was entitled to diplomatic immunity and should not have been arrested.

An inquest was held on October 5, 1903. Chinese witnesses testified that Tom Kim Yung was aggressively confronted by Policeman Kramer, who insulted him in pidgin English and rudely took hold of him. Tom shook off Kramer's grasp, then Kramer violently struck Tom and arrested him. Their accounts consistently portrayed Kramer as the aggressor, culminating in Colonel Tom's desperate attempt to escape into the consulate.

For a later inquest on October 10th, the Police officers initially declared to refused to attend the inquest. However, subpoenas were issued to Kramer and other police witnesses, mandating their testimony. The detailed accounts from the police witnesses during this inquest remain undisclosed. Following this session, the jury concluded that Tom's death was a suicide.

On January 29, 1904, for further investigation, the Police Commissioners convened to hear the testimonies of John H. Kramer, Joseph Brodt, and others. Police Officers John H. Kramer and Joseph Brodt testified they arrested Tom Kim Yung for violating a city ordinance and faced resistance. Lieutenant Gleeson and city prison officials attested to Tom's aggressive behavior during the arrest, and all denied any visible injuries on him. The transcription was sent to the Secretary of State at Washington.

In February, the Police Commissioners issued their final judgment, stating that Tom's arrest was justified. They ruled that the two police officers bore no responsibility or connection to Tom's death.
