= Premier Yan =

Premier Yan may refer to:

- Yan Huiqing (1877–1950), Premier of the Republic of China
- Yan Xishan (1883–1960), 4th Premier of the Republic of China

== Others ==
- Yen Chia-kan (嚴家淦; pinyin: Yán Jiāgàn; 1905–1993), 2nd President of the Republic of China
