= Tongzhou Senior High School of Jiangsu Province =

School in Nantong, Jiangsu, China

- Nantong, Jiangsu, China

Information
- Established: 1923
- Principal: Wu Canye
- Staff: 218
- Enrollment: 3,222
- Campus: Rural

Tongzhou Senior High School of Jiangsu Province
- Simplified Chinese: 江苏通州高级中学
Transcriptions
Standard Mandarin
- Hanyu Pinyin: Jiāngsū Tōngzhōu Gāojí Zhōngxué

Tongzhou Senior High School of Jiangsu Province is a senior high school in Nantong, Jiangsu, China, located in Tongzhou area.

== History ==
Tongzhou Senior High School of Jiangsu Province was established in 1923. In 1980, it won the Key High School title. In 2004, it became a member of Four-Star schools of Jiangsu.http://gaokao.chsi.com.cn/zx/sch/zxgkinfo.action?id=178385263

== Scale ==
It covers about 150,000 square meters and the building area takes up about fifty thousand square meters. There are 70 classes and 4000 students totally. Besides, there is a group of 218 specialized teachers, including two professorial grade senior teachers and seven special grade teachers. Like other high schools it's a common high school. In addition, it includes a teenager sports school which introduces about 40 talented students to the national and provincial track and field team. The school is also equipped with modern facilities such as scientific building, arts building, sports center, library and so on. They bring the benefits to students' and teachers' activities.

== Culture ==
Tongzhou Senior High School of Jiangsu Province regards "Masanori Ministry of Health and Welfare" as its motto. Every teacher sets up the idea that one must take each student into consideration and help each of them to achieve success. To firmly promote the quality education it treats reformation as the aim, scientific research as the guide and cooperation as the base. Furthermore, it attaches importance to students' mental education, and established the mentally healthy magazine called "Heart Spring" and the newspaper named "Mentally Healthy Reading". Its mental education was awarded the name "Four-Star Mental Training Center" by Nantong Education Bureau.

== Reputation ==
- National Exemplary Senior High School
- Four-Star Senior High School in Jiangsu
- Green High School in Jiangsu
- Teenager Olympic Competition Training Base
- Teenager Olympic Sports Club
- The source of good students for Nanjing University
- The High School Affiliated to Southeast University
