= Liang Shiyi =

Chinese politician (1869–1933)

- 梁士詒
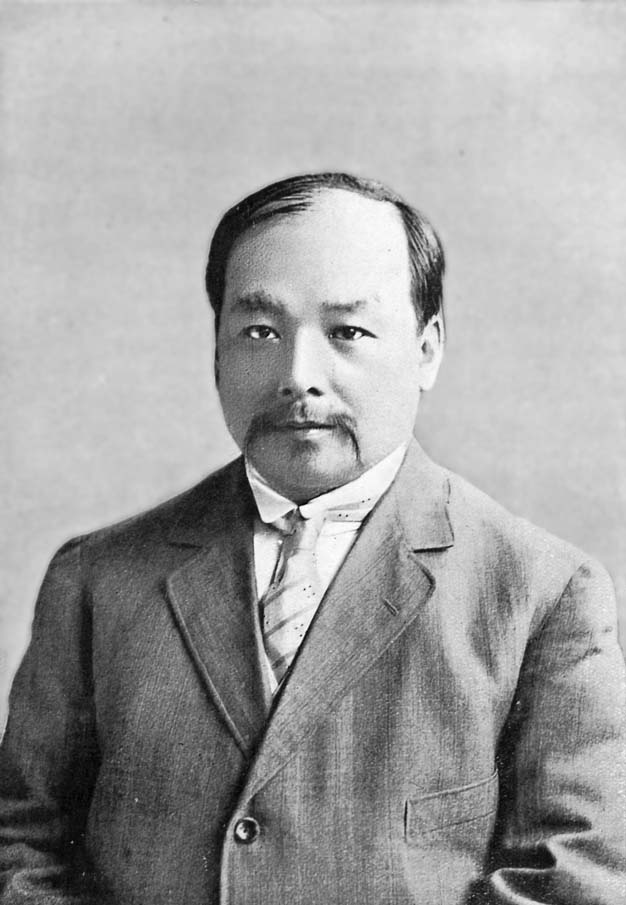

Premier of China
- In office 24 December 1921 – 25 January 1922
- President: Xu Shichang
- Preceded by: Yan Huiqing
- Succeeded by: Yan Huiqing

Minister of Mail and Communications
- In office 4 January – 12 February 1912 (acting)
- Monarch: Xuantong Emperor
- Prime Minister: Yuan Shikai (cabinet)
- Preceded by: Yang Shiqi
- Succeeded by: position abolished (1911 Revolution)

Personal details
- Born: May 5, 1869 Sanshui, Guangdong, Qing Dynasty
- Died: April 9, 1933 (aged 63) Shanghai, China
- Party: Communications Clique
- Education: jinshi degree in Imperial examination (1894)

Liang Shiyi (Chinese: 梁士詒; Wade–Giles: Liang Shih-i; Jyutping: Loeng^{4} Si^{6}ji^{4}; May 5, 1869 – April 9, 1933) was a Chinese minister who served as premier of China during the Beiyang government from 1921 to 1922.

== Biography ==
Liang Shiyi was born in Sanshui, Guangdong in 1869. In the Qing dynasty, he was put in charge of railways, the most profitable ministry of the government. This allowed him to create the influential Communications Clique. He was a close supporter of Yuan Shikai, served as his finance minister, and supported Yuan during the National Protection War.

After Yuan's death, President Li Yuanhong ordered the arrest of the eight top monarchists of Yuan's regime, this caused Liang to flee to Hong Kong. He returned in 1918 to run for the National Assembly.

His Communications Clique was a distant second compared to Duan Qirui's Anfu Club but nevertheless he became speaker of the Senate. He then became premier when Jin Yunpeng was forced to resign in December 1921. Liang had the backing of Zhang Zuolin and the Fengtian Clique.

His premiership was the subject of dispute between his supporter, Zhang and General Wu Peifu and the Zhili Clique. When Wu forced his resignation on January 25, 1922, it caused the First Zhili-Fengtian War. Liang was fortunate to avoid the war himself: he left Beijing under the excuse of illness as soon as he resigned. The Northern Expedition forced him to flee once again to Hong Kong in 1928, then he shuttled between Shanghai and Hong Kong until the Japanese invaded Manchuria in 1931. He died at Shanghai in 1933.

Preceded by Yan Huiqing	Premier of China; 1921-1922	Succeeded by Yan Huiqing
