= Du Xigui =

Chinese admiral

Du Xigui 杜錫珪
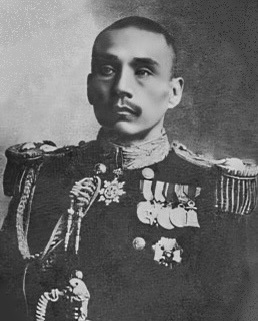

Acting President of China
- In office 22 June 1926 – 1 October 1926
- Premier: Himself
- Preceded by: Yan Huiqing (acting)
- Succeeded by: V. K. Wellington Koo (acting)

Acting Premier of China
- In office 22 June 1926 – 1 October 1926
- President: Himself
- Preceded by: Yan Huiqing (acting)
- Succeeded by: V. K. Wellington Koo (acting)

Minister of Navy
- In office October 1924 – November 1924
- Premier: Huang Fu (acting)
- Preceded by: Li Dingxin
- Succeeded by: Lin Jianzhang
- In office December 1925 – June 1927
- Premier: Xu Shiying; Jia Deyao; Hu Weide (acting); Yan Huiqing (acting); Himself (acting); V. K. Wellington Koo
- Preceded by: Lin Jianzhang
- Succeeded by: Yang Shuzhuang

Personal details
- Born: 12 November 1874 Fuzhou, Fujian, Qing dynasty
- Died: 28 December 1933 (aged 59) Shanghai, China
- Party: Zhili clique
- Awards: Order of Rank and Merit; Order of the Precious Brilliant Golden Grain; Order of Wen-Hu

Military service
- Allegiance: Qing dynasty (1902 – 1912); Beiyang government (1912 – 1928); Republic of China (1928 – 1933)
- Branch/service: Imperial Chinese Navy; Republic of China Navy
- Years of service: 1902 – 1933
- Rank: Admiral
- Battles/wars: Xinhai Revolution; Chinese Civil War

Du Xigui (Chinese: 杜錫珪; pinyin: Dù Xīguī; Wade–Giles: Tu Hsi-Kuei; 12 November 1874 – 28 December 1933) was a Chinese admiral during the late Qing dynasty and the Warlord Era.

== Biography ==
Born in Fuzhou, he graduated from the Nanjing naval college in 1902. In July 1911, Du was appointed the commander of a vessel. His crew followed orders from Yuan Shikai to sail up the Yangtze and help put down the Wuchang Uprising later that year. However, when he saw that the Qing empire was collapsing, Du and his sailors mutinied, joining the Republican government. The uprising was what forced the Qing naval minister Sa Zhenbing to resign his post. After Yuan became the head of the government in Beijing, Du continued to serve him.

In 1922, he was made chief of the navy and helped the Zhili clique defeat Zhang Zuolin. In the spring of 1923, Shanghai's fleet rebelled and Du took responsibility by resigning but was recalled in November. In 1924, he commanded the Yangtze fleet of Jiangsu and defeated the Anhui clique's Zhejiang fleet led by Lin Jianzhang. Several ships defected to his side giving him control of Shanghai's waters.

In 1926, Du served concurrently as acting president, premier, and minister of the navy. In 1927, with Du's backing, the Chinese navy defected to the Kuomintang; however Du lacked Chiang Kai-shek's trust and subsequently resigned from active service. The Nanjing Nationalist government later employed him and sent him on an inspection tour of foreign navies. He returned to China in 1930, becoming head of the naval academy in Fuzhou. When the Fujian Rebellion broke out, Du declined to offer support and instead moved to Shanghai, where he died on 28 December 1933.

== Gallery ==
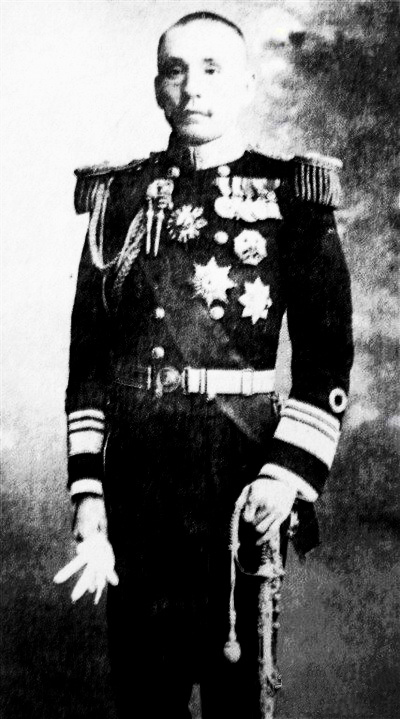
Du Xigui

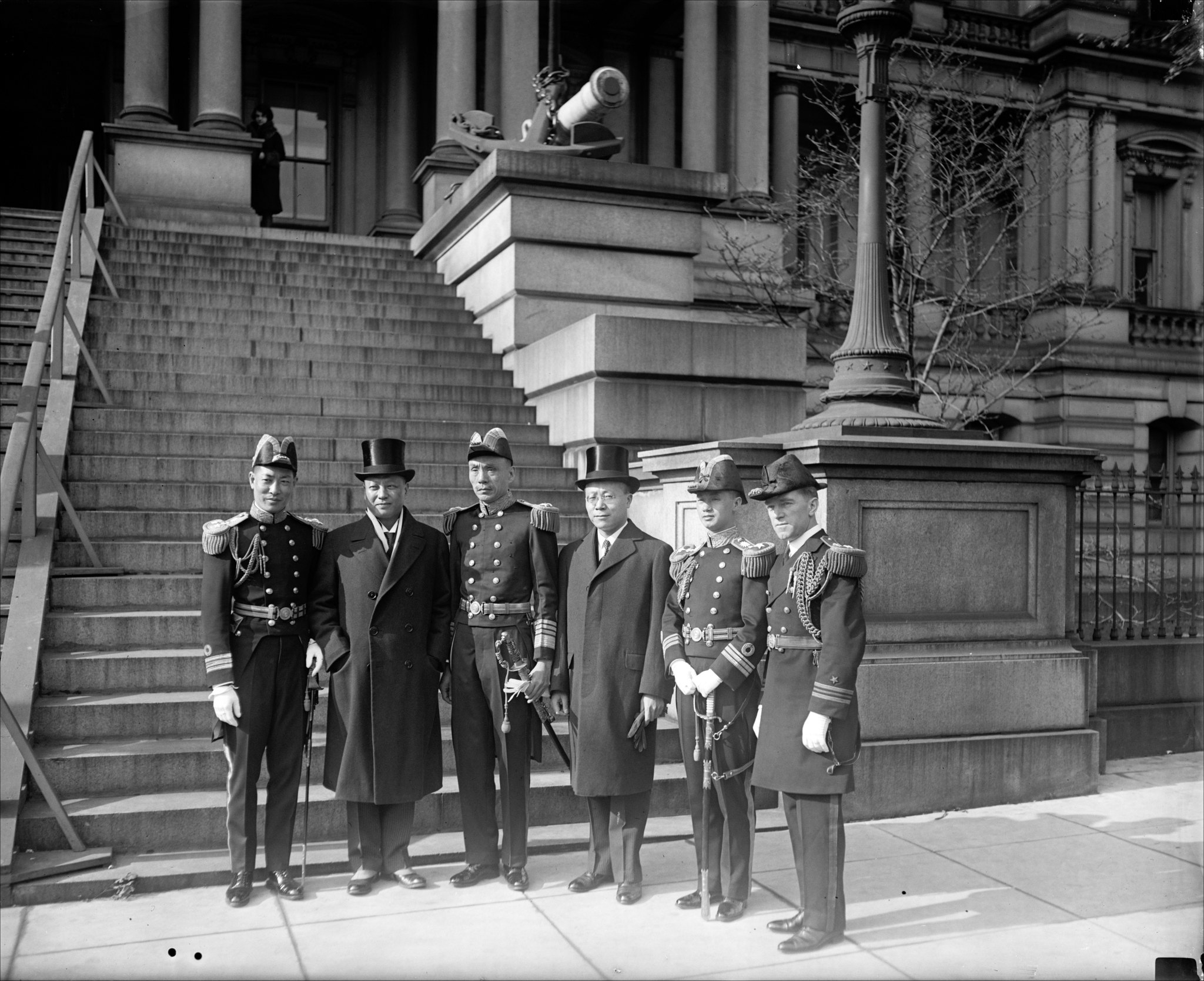
Du Xigui, third from left, in ROCN delegation to Washington D.C. in 1930

== See also ==
- List of premiers of the Republic of China
- List of presidents of the Republic of China

Political offices
Preceded by Yan Huiqing	President of China; 1926	Succeeded by Gu Weijun
Preceded by Yan Huiqing	Premier of China; 1926	Succeeded by Gu Weijun
Military offices
Preceded by Li Dingxin	Minister of Navy; 1924	Succeeded by Lin Jianzhang
Preceded by Lin Jianzhang	Minister of Navy of the Republic of China; 1925–1927	Succeeded by Yang Shuzhuang
