= Li Wanheng =

Chinese colonel (1923–2016)

Li Wanheng 李万恒
- Born: October 1923; Laishui, Zhili, China (present-day Baoding, Hebei, China)
- Died: 6 May 2016 (aged 92) Qingdao, Shandong, China
- Allegiance: Chinese Communist Party; China
- Branch: People's Liberation Army
- Service years: 1940–1983
- Rank: Colonel of the People's Liberation Army
- Commands: 67th Army of the People's Liberation Army (June 1981–May 1983)
- Conflicts: Second Sino-Japanese War, Chinese Civil War, Korean War
- Awards: The Independent Merit Medal of Honor (1988)

Li Wanheng (Chinese: 李万恒; pinyin: Lǐ Wànhéng; October 1923 – 6 May 2016) was a Chinese colonel of the People's Liberation Army. He served as the commander of the 67th Army of the People's Liberation Army from 1981 to 1983.

== Biography ==
Li Wanheng was born in Laishui County, Zhili (now Hebei). He joined the Eighth Route Army (18th Army Group of the National Revolutionary Army of the Republic of China) in October 1940, and joined the Chinese Communist Party the following year. Li was the chief staff officer of the 597th Regiment, 199th Division in the Korean War. He saw action a series of battles with the 67th Army especially in the Battle of Kumsong, the last large-scale battle of the Korean War. Li became the deputy commander of the 597th Regiment, commander of the 597th Regiment, deputy commander of the 199th Division, chief staff officer of the 199th Division and commander of the 199th Division sequentially after he returned to China. He was promoted as the colonel of the People's Liberation Army in 1965. Li was the army corps commander of the 67th Army between 1981 and 1983. He retired from army in August 1983.

Li died on 6 May 2016 at the age of 92 in Qingdao.
