= Gu Fangzhou =

Chinese physician and virologist (1926–2019)

People's Scientist Gu Fangzhou
- 顾方舟
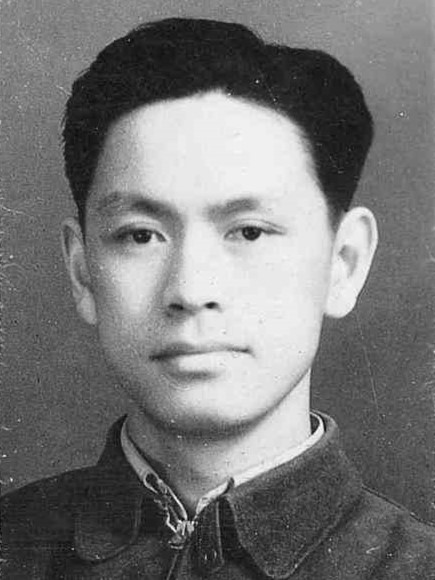
- Gu Fangzhou in youth
- Born: June 16, 1926; Shanghai, China
- Died: January 2, 2019 (aged 92); Beijing, China
- Education: Peking University; Institute of Virology, USSR Academy of Medical Sciences
- Known for: "Father of the polio vaccine in China"
- Medical career
- Profession: Virology
- Institutions: Peking Union Medical College
- Research: Polio vaccine etc.

Gu Fangzhou (simplified Chinese: 顾方舟; traditional Chinese: 顧方舟; pinyin: Gù Fāngzhōu; Wade–Giles: Ku Fang-chou; 16 June 1926 – 2 January 2019) was a Chinese virologist, best known for developing domestic OPV (oral polio vaccine) and eradicating polio in the country.

== Career ==
Gu matriculated at Peking University for a MBBS degree in 1944. He went to the Soviet Union to study virology from 1951 to 1955. He was engaged in poliovirus from 1957.

Gu conducted the trials and production of the polio vaccine, especially "sugar cube". He succeeded in developing first domestic inactivated polio vaccine in 1960, and trivalent oral polio vaccine later. He served as president of Peking Union Medical College from 1984 to 1993. He was also the first president of the Chinese Society for Immunology.

On 2 January 2019, Gu died in Beijing, at the age of 92.

== Legacy ==
In December 2025, the UNESCO 43rd General Assembly approved a resolution to include the centenary commemoration of Gu Fangzhou among UNESCO's series of international memorial events, which proposed by the China Association for Science and Technology.
