= List of presidents of the Republic of China by other offices held =

This is a list of presidents (post-1947 constitution) of the Republic of China by other offices (either elected or appointed) held. Every president of the Republic of China has served as at least one of the following:

- Vice President of the Republic of China
- an elected representative (either Legislative Yuan or National Assembly)
- a governor or mayor of a province or special municipality
- an Executive Yuan minister
- a general of the Republic of China Army

== Central government ==
=== Executive branch ===
==== Vice presidents ====
Vice President	President served under	Year(s) served	Notes
Yen Chia-kan	Chiang Kai-shek	1966–1975	Became president after Chiang K.S.'s death
Lee Teng-hui	Chiang Ching-kuo	1984–1988	Became president after Chiang C.K.'s death
William Lai	Tsai Ing-wen	2020–2024	Succeeded Tsai after winning the 2024 election

3 vice presidents (Lien Chan, Annette Lu, and William Lai) all made failed runs for the presidency. Lien received their party's nomination. Lai would later be elected in a second run for the presidency.

==== Executive Yuan Ministers ====
Italics indicate positions before promulgation of the 1947 constitution.

Minister	Office	President served under	Year(s) served
Chiang Kai-shek	Premier	Chiang Kai-shek	1930–1931
Chiang Kai-shek	Premier	Lin Sen	1935–1938
Chiang Kai-shek	Premier	Lin Sen; Chiang Kai-shek	1939–1945
Chiang Kai-shek	Minister of Foreign Affairs	Lin Sen	1941–1942
Yen Chia-kan	Minister of Economic Affairs	Chiang Kai-shek	1950
Yen Chia-kan	Minister of Finance	Chiang Kai-shek	1950–1954
Yen Chia-kan	Minister of Council for United States Aid	Chiang Kai-shek	1957–1958
Yen Chia-kan	Minister of Council for International Economic Cooperation and Development	Chiang Kai-shek	1963–1969
Yen Chia-kan	Minister of Vocational Assistance Commission for Retired Servicemen	Chiang Kai-shek	1954–1956
Yen Chia-kan	Minister of Finance	Chiang Kai-shek	1958–1963
Chiang Ching-kuo	Minister of Vocational Assistance Commission for Retired Servicemen	Chiang Kai-shek; Yen Chia-kan	1956–1964
Chiang Ching-kuo	Minister Without Portfolio	Chiang Kai-shek; Yen Chia-kan	1958–1965
Chiang Ching-kuo	Minister of National Defense	Chiang Kai-shek; Yen Chia-kan	1965–1969
Chiang Ching-kuo	Minister of Council for International Economic Cooperation and Development	Chiang Kai-shek; Yen Chia-kan	1969–1973
Chiang Ching-kuo	Vice Premier	Chiang Kai-shek; Yen Chia-kan	1969–1972
Chiang Ching-kuo	Premier	Chiang Kai-shek; Yen Chia-kan	1972–1978
Lee Teng-hui	Minister Without Portfolio	Chiang Kai-shek; Yen Chia-kan	1972–1978
Ma Ying-jeou	Minister of Research, Development and Evaluation Commission	Lee Teng-hui	1988–1991
Ma Ying-jeou	Minister of Justice	Lee Teng-hui	1993–1996
Tsai Ing-wen	Minister of Mainland Affairs Council	Chen Shui-bian	2000–2004
Tsai Ing-wen	Vice Premier	Chen Shui-bian	2006–2007
Tsai Ing-wen	Minister of Consumer Protection Committee	Chen Shui-bian	2006–2007
William Lai	Premier	Tsai Ing-wen	2017–2019

=== Parliament ===
==== National Assembly ====
Constituency	President	Year(s) served	Notes
Fenghua, Chekiang	Chiang Kai-shek	1948–1975	
Party list	Ma Ying-jeou	1992–1996	
Tainan City	William Lai	1996–1999	

==== Legislative Yuan ====
Constituency	President	Year(s) served	Notes
Taipei	Chen Shui-bian	1990–1994	Later elected as Mayor of Taipei
Party list	Tsai Ing-wen	2005–2006	Later appointed as vice premier
Tainan City; Tainan City 2	William Lai	1999–2010	Later elected as Mayor of Tainan

== Local government ==
=== Governors and Mayors of Special Municipalities ===
Province / Special Municipality	President	Year(s) served	Notes
Szechwan	Chiang Kai-shek	1939–1940	
Tainan	William Lai	2010–2017	
Taipei	Lee Teng-hui	1978–1981	
Taipei	Chen Shui-bian	1994–1998	
Taipei	Ma Ying-jeou	1998–2006	
Taiwan	Lee Teng-hui	1981-1984	

=== Provincial or City Councillors ===
Provincial/City Council	President	Year(s)served	Notes
Taipei City Council	Chen Shui-bian	1981–1985	

=== Other provincial or municipal offices ===
President	Office and Jurisdiction	Year(s) served
Yen Chia-kan	Commissioner, Department of Finance, Fukien Province	1939–1945
Yen Chia-kan	Commissioner, Department of Construction, Fukien Province	1847–1849

== Military ==
President	Term of office	Position(s)
Chiang Kai-shek	1948–1975	Generalissimo in the Republic of China Army; Chairman of the Military Affairs Commission
Chiang Ching-kuo	1978–1988	General in the Republic of China Army

== Lost races ==
=== Presidential elections ===
President	Office and jurisdiction	Year	Notes
Tsai Ing-wen	President of the Republic of China	2012	Lost to Ma Ying-jeou. Won in 2016, 2020
William Lai	Democratic Progressive nomination for President of the Republic of China	2020	Lost to Tsai Ing-wen. Later served as her running mate. Won in 2024

=== Local elections ===
President	Office and jurisdiction	Year	Notes
Chen Shui-bian	Tainan County Magistrate	1985	Lost to Lee Ya-chiao.
Chen Shui-bian	Mayor of Taipei	1998	Lost to Ma Ying-jeou.
Tsai Ing-wen	Mayor of New Taipei	2010	Lost to Eric Chu.
