= Jia Deyao =

Chinese military commander and politician

- 賈德耀
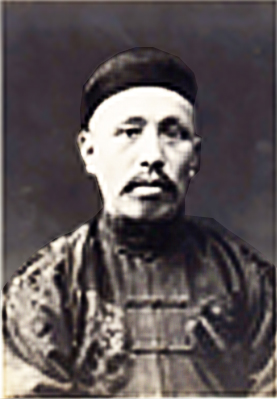

Premier of China
- In office 4 March 1926 – 20 April 1926
- President: Duan Qirui
- Preceded by: Xu Shiying
- Succeeded by: Hu Weide (acting)

Personal details
- Born: 1880
- Died: 1940 (aged 59–60)
- Education: Baoding Military Academy; Imperial Japanese Army Academy

Jia Deyao (simplified Chinese: 贾德耀; traditional Chinese: 賈德耀; pinyin: Jiǎ Déyào; Wade–Giles: Chia Te-yao; 1880–1940) was a Chinese military commander and politician, member of the Anhui clique during the Beiyang Government.

After graduating the Baoding Military Academy and the Imperial Japanese Army Academy with a government scholarship, he returned to China and joined the army as a minor commander. He became a brigadier general, head of the Board of Military Academy of the Department of Army in 1916, and a commander at Xia Nan. In 1918, he became a lieutenant general and principal of the Baoding Military Academy. In November 1925, he became assistant secretary of the Department of Army, and soon was promoted to Secretary of Army and commander of the national guard.

On February 15, 1926, he was temporarily appointed as Premier of China after his predecessor, Xu Shiying, resigned. On March 5 of the same year, the government underwent reorganization and he was officially given the position. Two days after the March 18 Massacre's weakening of warlord control over China, Deyao tried to resign, but his request was not accepted. On April 20, following a successful resignation, he left Beijing with former president Duan Qirui. The two exiled themselves in Tianjin, Deyao withdrawing himself completely from public life. He died in 1940 of natural causes.

Preceded by Xu Shiying	Premier of China; 1926	Succeeded by Hu Weide
