= Yan Huiqing =

Chinese diplomat and politician

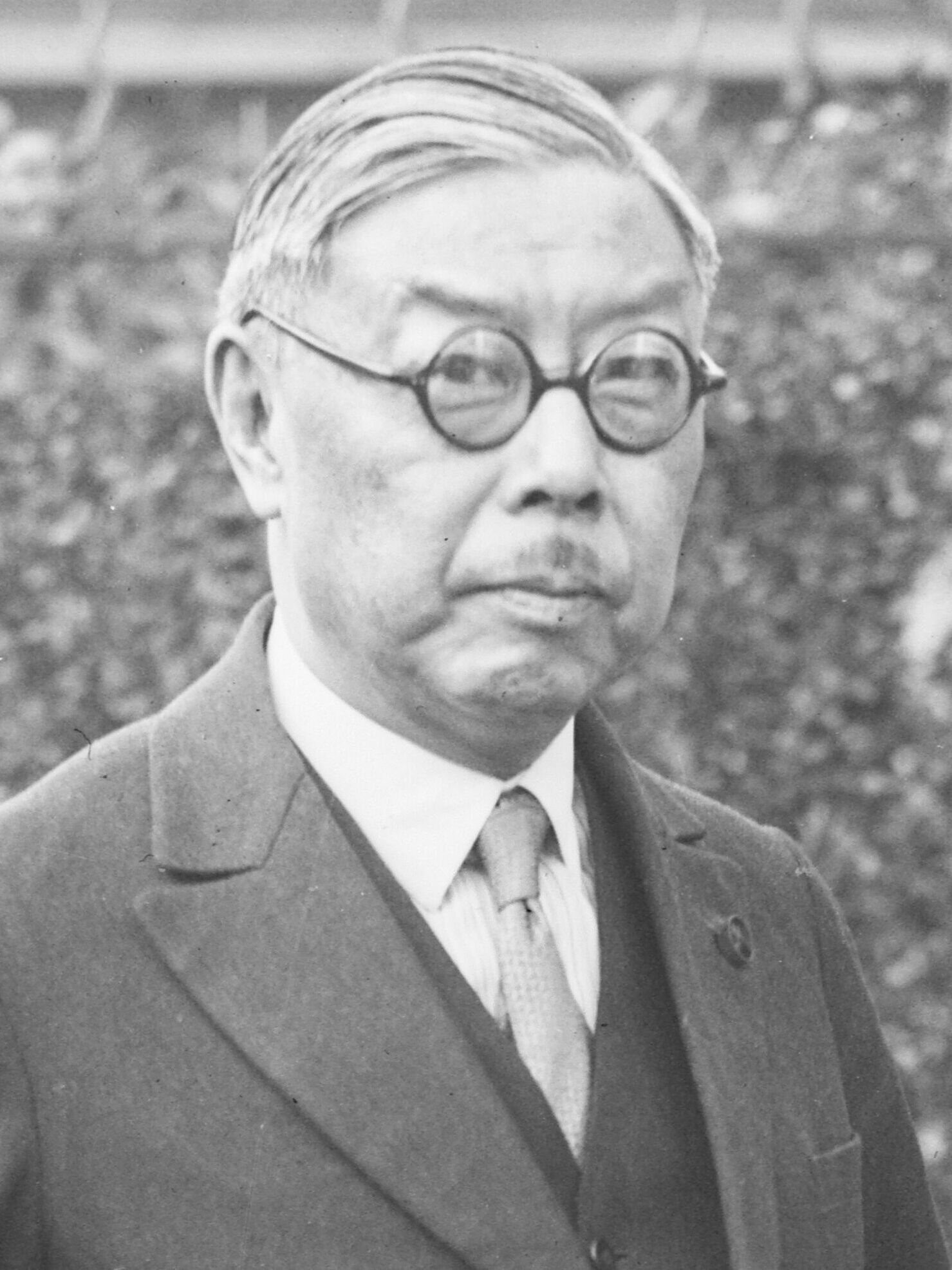
- Yan in 1932

Acting President of China
- In office 13 May 1926 – 22 June 1926
- Prime Minister: Himself
- Preceded by: Hu Weide (acting)
- Succeeded by: Du Xigui (acting)

Premier of China
- In office 13 May 1926 – 22 June 1926; Acting
- President: Himself
- Preceded by: Hu Weide
- Succeeded by: Du Xigui
- In office 14 September 1924 – 31 October 1924
- President: Cao Kun
- Preceded by: Wellington Koo
- Succeeded by: Huang Fu
- In office 11 June 1922 – 5 August 1922
- President: Li Yuanhong
- Preceded by: Zhou Ziqi
- Succeeded by: Tang Shaoyi
- In office 25 January 1922 – 8 April 1922
- President: Xu Shichang
- Preceded by: Liang Shiyi
- Succeeded by: Zhou Ziqi
- In office 18 December 1921 – 24 December 1921; Acting
- President: Xu Shichang
- Preceded by: Jin Yunpeng
- Succeeded by: Liang Shiyi

Personal details
- Born: 2 April 1877 Shanghai, Qing Dynasty
- Died: 24 May 1950 (aged 73) Shanghai, China
- Party: Anhui clique
- Education: University of Virginia (BA); Peiyang University (DLitt)

Yan Huiqing (Chinese: 顏惠慶; pinyin: Yán Huìqìng; Wade–Giles: Yen Hui-Ch'ing, also Weiching Williams Yen or simply W.W. Yen; 2 April 1877 – 24 May 1950) was a Chinese diplomat and politician who served under the Qing Dynasty, the Republic of China and the People's Republic of China. He held the title of jinshi in the imperial bureaucracy. Notably, he served briefly as Premier and later President of the Republic of China in the 1920s, and, shortly before his death, became a member of the National Committee of the Chinese People's Political Consultative Conference.

== Biography ==
Born to a clergyman in Shanghai, Yan Huiqing, along with his brother Yen Te Ching, moved to Virginia to attend the Episcopal High School in Alexandria, Virginia. He graduated from the University of Virginia where he had studied political science, received prizes and medals for debate, and had been elected to Phi Beta Kappa. He taught English at St. John's University, Shanghai for a short time after coming back from the United States, where he had become a Freemason, and then went to Beijing to start his political career. In 1906, he became an editor at the Commercial Press, received a D.Litt. from the Peiyang University (now Tianjin University) and the title of jinshi in the imperial civil service, and was appointed to the Imperial Ministry of Education.

He served as Foreign Minister, premier (and acting premier) five times and as acting president during his last premiership in 1926. Wu Peifu handpicked him for the acting presidency to pave the way for Cao Kun's restoration, and he set up a cabinet in anticipation, but he was unable to take office due to Zhang Zuolin's objection. When Yan finally took his post, he immediately resigned and appointed navy minister Du Xigui as his successor.

A veteran diplomat, he was China's first ambassador to the Soviet Union, and a delegate to the Washington Naval Conference and the League of Nations; he also served as a diplomat to Germany, Sweden, Denmark, and, finally, the United States, where he denounced the Japanese invasion of Manchuria. During World War II, he translated and compiled Stories of Old China in Hong Kong while under Japanese house-arrest in 1942. In early 1949 he visited Moscow and met with Joseph Stalin, in hopes of negotiating a solution in the Chinese Civil War.

After the founding of the People's Republic of China in 1949, he congratulated Mao Zedong on his victory, became a member of the National Committee of the Chinese People's Political Consultative Conference and he was also appointed Vice Chairman of the East China Military and Political Committee.

On May 24, 1950, Yan Huiqing died of heart disease in Shanghai at the age of 73. Mao Zedong and Zhou Enlai both sent condolences. He was survived by his wife and six children.

In 2016, the University of Virginia paid tribute to Yen by creating the W.W. Yen China Fund. W.W. Yen was the first student from China to earn a degree from the University of Virginia. The former Lewis House is now Yen House, in honor of Yen.

Political offices
Preceded by Jin Yunpeng	Premier of China; 1921	Succeeded by Liang Shiyi
Preceded by Liang Shiyi	Premier of China; 1922	Succeeded by Zhou Ziqi
Preceded by Zhou Ziqi	Premier of China; 1922	Succeeded by Wang Chonghui
Preceded by Wellington Koo	Premier of China; 1924	Succeeded by Huang Fu
Preceded by Hu Weide	President of China; 1926	Succeeded by Du Xigui
