= Hu Weide =

Chinese politician and diplomat

Hu Weide 胡惟德
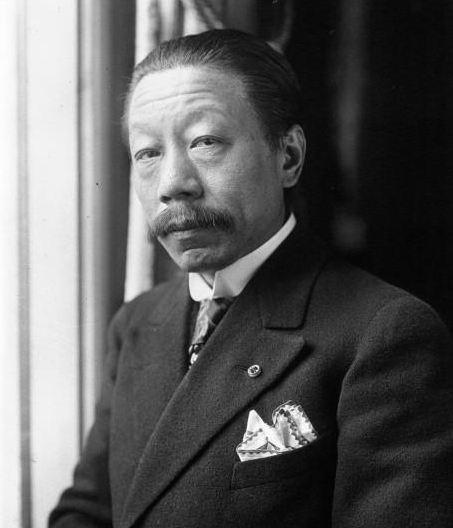
- Hu in 1917

Acting President of China
- In office 20 April 1926 – 13 May 1926
- Premier: Himself
- Preceded by: Duan Qirui (as Chief Executive)
- Succeeded by: Yan Huiqing (acting)

Acting Premier of China
- In office 20 April 1926 – 13 May 1926
- President: Himself
- Preceded by: Duan Qirui
- Succeeded by: Yan Huiqing (acting)

Personal details
- Born: 1863 Wuxing District, Huzhou, Zhejiang, Qing dynasty
- Died: 24 November 1933 (aged 69–70) Beiping, China
- Party: Non-partisan
- Education: Shanghai Interpreters' College
- Awards: Order of the Double Dragon; Order of Rank and Merit; Order of the Precious Brilliant Golden Grain; Order of the Rising Sun

Hu Weide (Chinese: 胡惟德; pinyin: Hú Wéidé; Wade–Giles: Hu Wei-te) (1863 – 24 November 1933) was a Chinese politician and diplomat during the Qing dynasty and the Republic of China.

== Biography ==
Though related by marriage to the Qing dynasty, he accepted the creation of the Republic and served in its foreign ministry, having previously been the Vice Minister of Foreign Affairs in the Qing Dynasty as a member of Yuan Shikai's Cabinet. He served as ambassador to Russia, Japan, and France; and was a rival of Wu Tingfang. He was also a judge of the Permanent Court of International Justice.

After Duan Qirui was ousted from Beijing in 1926, Hu served briefly as acting president and premier.

Hu Weide's political career is unique in that his career did not end with the passage of power from one form of government to another. He was a prominent politician and diplomat in the late Qing Dynasty as well as the early Republic of China. His role in the Chinese diplomacy history is immense, although he is also considered by many as being responsible for the feeble diplomacy practiced by China. Hu was truly one of the first Chinese politicians with a strong grasp of global affairs. He graduated from the Shanghai Interpreters' College. His proficiency in English, French and Russian allowed him to pursue the study of these countries, which made him a specialist in these nations.

Hu Weide's stature in the Chinese and international diplomatic sphere can be gauged from the fact that he was a member of the Chinese delegation at the Treaty of Versailles and at The Hague Peace Conference. Although he did not receive praise for his work to bring democracy in China, he played a vital role in persuading the late Qing Government to relinquish power in favor of the new Republic.

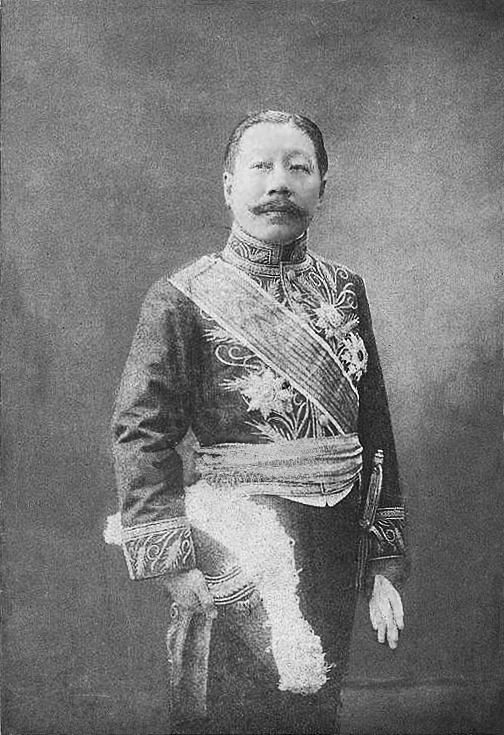
Hú Wéidé

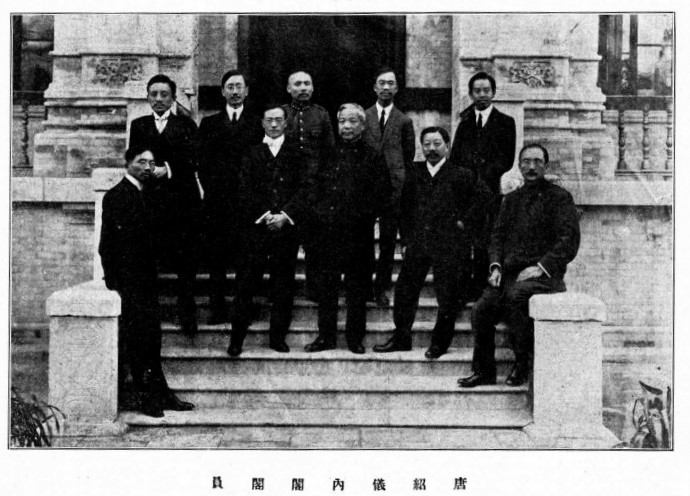
Hú Wéidé in a group photo

Political offices
Preceded by Duan Qirui	President of China; 1926	Succeeded by Yan Huiqing
Preceded by Jia Deyao	Premier of China; 1926	Succeeded by Yan Huiqing
