= Zhou Ziqi =

Chinese educator and politician (1869–1923)

Zhou Ziqi 周自齊
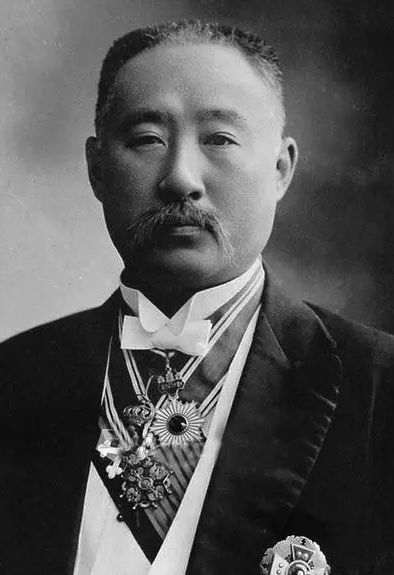

Acting President of China
- In office 2 June 1922 – 11 June 1922
- Preceded by: Xu Shichang
- Succeeded by: Li Yuanhong

Acting Premier of China
- In office 8 April 1922 – 11 June 1922
- President: Xu Shichang; Himself (as acting President)
- Preceded by: Yan Huiqing
- Succeeded by: Yan Huiqing

Minister of War
- In office 1913–1914
- Preceded by: Duan Qirui
- Succeeded by: Wang Shizhen

Personal details
- Born: November 17, 1869 Chaozhou, Guangdong, Qing Dynasty
- Died: October 21, 1923 (aged 53) Shanghai, China
- Party: Non-partisan
- Other political affiliations: Progressive Party
- Education: Columbia University
- Awards: Order of Rank and Merit; Order of the Precious Brilliant Golden Grain; Order of the Rising Sun; Order of the Sacred Treasure; Order of Saints Maurice and Lazarus

Military service
- Allegiance: Qing dynasty Republic of China

Chinese name
- Traditional Chinese: 周自齊
- Simplified Chinese: 周自齐
Transcriptions
Standard Mandarin
- Hanyu Pinyin: Zhōu Zìqí
- Wade–Giles: Chow^{1} Tzu^{4}-ch'i^{2}
Yue: Cantonese
- Jyutping: Zau^{1} Zi^{6}cai^{4}
Southern Min
- Teochew Peng'im: Ziu^{1} Ze^{6}ci^{5}

Zhou Ziqi (Chinese: 周自齊; pinyin: Zhōu Zìqí; Wade–Giles: Chow Tzu-ch'i) (17 November 1869 – 21 October 1923) was a Chinese educator and politician in the late Qing dynasty and early republican period. During the early part of the Republic, he served multiple roles: first in multiple ministry positions (including Communication and Finance), as a diplomat, then as acting President of the Republic, and, for a time, as acting Premier in 1922, during Liang Shiyi's illness. He was a member of the Communications Clique.

== Biography ==
Born in Guangdong, Zhou, who spoke both Cantonese and Mandarin Chinese, later moved back to his ancestral province of Shandong. He attended Columbia University in the United States, and upon returning to China, he helped found Tsinghua University to prepare Chinese students to study abroad in America; among the subjects he emphasized were English, mathematics, and science. During his time at Tsinghua, Zhou was in charge of sending students to study abroad, and from 1911 to 1912, he served as president of the university.

As the governor of Shandong Province, he exerted significant influence, helping leak information about the Twenty-One Demands to the media.

A supporter of Yuan Shikai, the provisional president, and his actions to revert China from a republic to a monarch-led empire, Zhou, during his tenure as governor of Shandong, believed that the Chinese people, with a literacy rate of 2%, were not ready to govern themselves. In his view, the people could only be manipulated by politicians, and their actions would bring instability and chaos to the country. (To further buttress his argument, Zhou may have invited Columbia University political scientist Frank Johnson Goodnow to justify monarchism for China.) In 1913, Yuan appointed him Minister of War, a post in which he served until the following year.

Yuan attempted to re-establish the Empire of China in late 1915, sending Zhou to the Empire of Japan as a special envoy. The Japanese government under Okuma Shigenobu rejected him, and he returned to China to tell Yuan that his government had lost foreign support. After the failure of the restoration of the monarchy and Yuan's death in June 1916, Zhou found that his support for the Empire was not without personal cost: considered one of the eight top monarchists of the former regime, he was declared a traitor; and the new President, Li Yuanhong, ordered his arrest, causing Zhou to flee to Japan for asylum. After being pardoned by President Feng Guozhang in 1918, he served as Minister of Finance in 1920, under Xu Shichang.

As finance minister, he lost a power struggle against Premier Jin Yunpeng in 1921, and was compelled to resign. Seeking revenge, he convinced Zhang Zuolin to replace the premier with Liang Shiyi, the head of the civilian Communications Clique. That same year, he served as a member of the Chinese delegation to the Washington Naval Conference, before his resignation due to the "negative results" of the conference.

Zhou also served as President of the Bank of China, Minister of Communication, Minister of Military, Minister of Agriculture and Commerce, and the Inspector General of Salt.

In 1922, he briefly served as acting premier and acting president, after the resignation of Liang as premier (due to illness), and, later, Xu as President. His presidency, the shortest in Chinese history, was an interim one, as the Zhili clique tried to woo Li Yuanhong back into office. Having succeeded, but complaining of Zhili interference, he left to study film-making in the United States, later returning to China to start a film studio. He died on Oct 21, 1923 at his home in Beijing.

Zhou's tomb is located in Mentougou district (门头沟区) in the western outskirts of Beijing, at the intersection of Jiulong road (九龙路) and Shuangxing road (双杏路). As of 2026 the tomb was not officially maintained, and its entrance had become badly overgrown with vegetation, making it difficult to see from the road.

Political offices
Preceded by Xu Shichang	President of China; 1922	Succeeded by Li Yuanhong
Preceded by Yan Huiqing	Premier of China; 1922	Succeeded by Yan Huiqing
