= Li Yuanhong =

Fourth President of the Republic of China

- 黎元洪
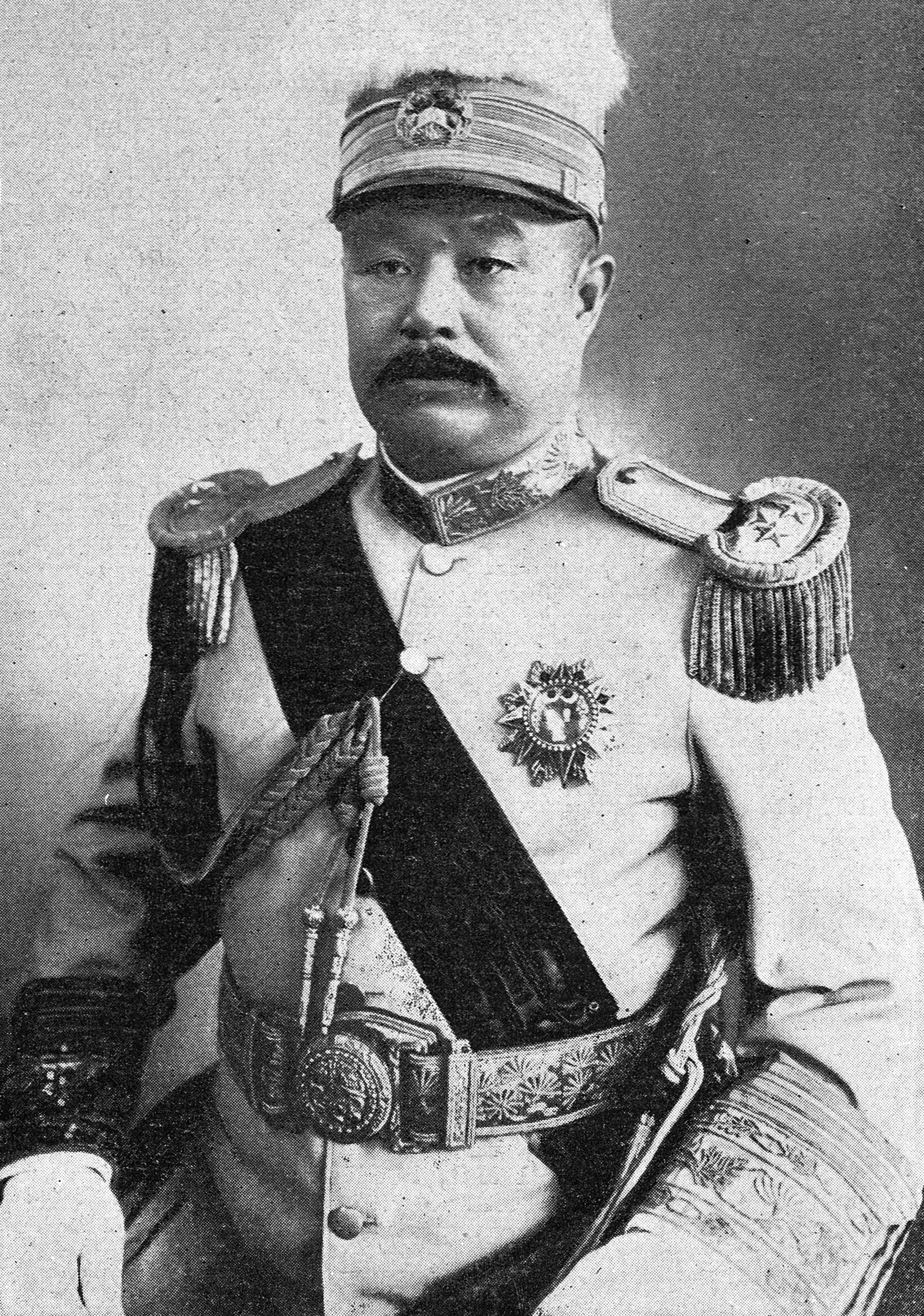
- Li in about 1915

President of China
- In office 11 June 1922 – 13 June 1923
- Preceded by: Zhou Ziqi
- Succeeded by: Gao Lingwei
- In office 7 June 1916 – 17 July 1917
- Preceded by: Yuan Shikai
- Succeeded by: Feng Guozhang

Provisional Vice President of China
- In office 1 January 1912 – 6 June 1916
- President: Sun Yat-sen; Yuan Shikai
- Succeeded by: Feng Guozhang

Personal details
- Born: 19 October 1864 Huangpi, Hubei, Qing dynasty
- Died: 3 June 1928 (aged 63) Tianjin, Zhili, Republic of China
- Party: Republican Party; Progressive Party
- Education: Beiyang Naval College
- Awards: Order of Rank and Merit; Order of Wen-Hu; Order of the Golden Grain

Military service
- Allegiance: Qing dynasty 1889–1911 (Republic of China (1912–1949)) Republic of China; 1911–1912
- Branch/service: Beiyang Navy; Hubei Provincial Army; Tongmenghui (1911)
- Battles/wars: First Sino-Japanese War; Xinhai Revolution

Li Yuanhong (Chinese: 黎元洪; pinyin: Lí Yuánhóng; Wade–Giles: Li^{2} Yüan^{2}-hung^{2}; courtesy name 宋卿; Sòngqīng; Sung^{4}-ch'ing^{1}; October 19, 1864 – June 3, 1928) was a prominent Chinese military and political leader of the Qing dynasty and the Republic of China. He was the Provisional Vice President of China from 1912 to 1913 as well as the president of China between 1916 and 1917, and between 1922 and 1923.

He was born in Huangpi, Hubei. Li initially pursued a military career, graduating from the Tianjin Military Academy in 1896. His leadership and military acumen quickly earned him recognition, leading to his involvement in significant historical events, including the 1911 Revolution that ended over two hundred years of Qing rule in China. Li's role in the revolution, particularly his reluctant yet crucial leadership of the Wuchang Uprising, established him as a key figure in the new Republic.

In the early years of the Republic, Li held several important positions, including serving as Vice President and later as President. His tenure was marked by efforts to stabilize the new republic amidst internal strife and external pressures. His first presidency (1916-1917) ended abruptly due to a coup by the warlord Zhang Xun, who attempted to restore the Qing Dynasty. Li was restored to the presidency in 1922 but struggled to assert control in the fragmented political environment.

Li's later years were spent in relative obscurity after retiring from political life following his second term as president. He continued to be respected for his contributions to the establishment of the Republic of China and his commitment to constitutionalism and national unity. Li died in Tianjin, leaving behind a legacy of cautious yet principled leadership during one of China's most turbulent periods. His efforts to bridge the old imperial order and the new republican era are remembered as a testament to his dedication to his country.

== Early life ==
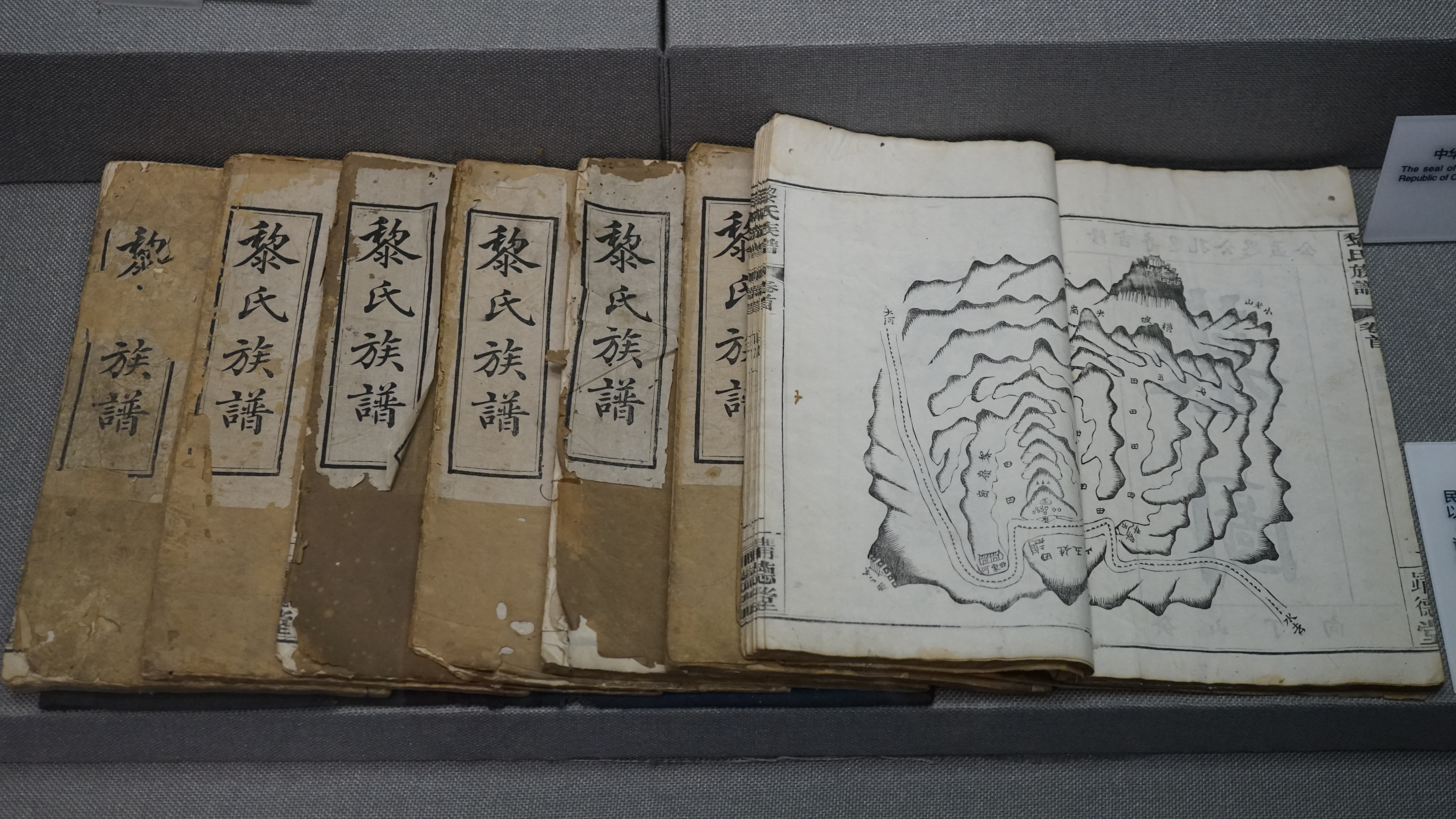
Genealogy of Family Li. According to the records of the genealogy, Li lived his childhood in Hanyang.

A native of Huangpi, Hubei, he was the son of a Qing veteran of the Taiping Rebellion named Li Chaoxiang (Chinese: 黎朝相). He graduated from the Tianjin naval academy in 1889 and served as an engineer in the First Sino-Japanese War. His cruiser was sunk and he survived because of his life belt, since he could not swim. He later joined the Hubei New Army and became senior military officer in Hankou. In 1910, he attempted to break up revolutionary rings that infiltrated his 21st Mixed Brigade. He did not arrest anyone caught in subversive activities, but simply dismissed them.

== National prominence ==
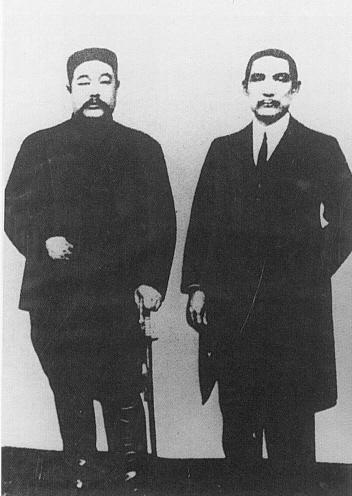
Sun Yat-sen at right and Li Yuanhong at Wuchang, China, in April 1912

When the Xinhai Revolution of 1911 broke out, the Wuchang mutineers needed a visible high-ranking officer to be their figurehead. Li was well respected, had supported the Railway Protection Movement, and knew English, which would be useful in dealing with foreign concerns. He was reportedly dragged from hiding under his wife's bed and forced at gunpoint to be the provisional military governor of Hubei despite killing several of the rebels. Though reluctant at first, he embraced the revolution after its growing momentum and was named military governor of China on 30 November. Qing Premier Yuan Shikai negotiated a truce with him on 4 December.

While Li commanded the rebel army, Sun Yat-sen of the Revolutionary Alliance became the first provisional president in Nanjing on 1 January 1912. Li was made vice president as a compromise and he formed People's Society to campaign for the presidency. Meanwhile, the north was still under the control of the Qing. A negotiation made Sun step down in favor of Yuan Shikai as president with Li keeping his vice-presidency. This ended the Qing dynasty and reunified north and south China. People's Society later merged with the pro-Yuan Republican Party.

In 1913, he combined the Republicans with Liang Qichao's Democratic Party to form the Progressive Party. The Progressives became the biggest rivals to the opposition Nationalists led by Sun. He supported Yuan against Sun during the Second Revolution which earned him the enmity of his former comrades. When Yuan pulled off his presidential coup, Li was viewed as a potential threat and confined in Beijing where he became a passive bystander under Yuan's grip. Yuan could never fully trust Li because he wasn't a protégé within the Beiyang Army's inner circle and because of his past association with the revolutionaries. Nevertheless, Yuan married his son to Li's daughter to strengthen their ties. Li kept his office and honors as vice president but had no power. Some factions called on Li to claim the presidency when Yuan crowned himself emperor in 1916. He refused for fear of his life but he also declined the aristocratic title of Prince granted by Yuan in the Empire of China (1915–16), a decision which would help his standing later on. Li remained in self-imposed isolation at his residence during the monarchic period, and until the death of Yuan.

== Presidency and later life ==
Li served as president from 7 June 1916 to 17 July 1917. When Yuan died, he left a will containing Li's name along with Premier Duan Qirui and Xu Shichang. The will was an imperial tradition started by the Kangxi Emperor, and was not constitutional in the republic. Nevertheless, the Beiyang generals pressed Li into office, since he was acceptable to the rebellious southern provinces. Li tried to return to the 1912 constitutional arrangement, but Duan held the real power. The National Assembly of the Republic of China reconvened on 1 August 1916, after having been disbanded over two and a half years earlier. Duan was eager to pull China into World War I but Li was more hesitant. They conflicted greatly over Duan's decision to cut ties with Germany. Li forced Duan to resign on 23 May 1917, when the premier's secret loans from Japan were exposed. Duan fled to Tianjin to muster his forces, and most generals abandoned the government. In response, Li asked General Zhang Xun for assistance. In exchange, Zhang asked for the dissolution of parliament which was granted on 13 June. Zhang, who was secretly pro-German, unexpectedly occupied Beijing from 14 June to 12 July 1917 and kept the president prisoner. Zhang then proceeded with a move that would undermine most of his support when he attempted to restore Emperor Puyi and the Qing dynasty on 1 July. Li was released to the Japanese legation where he asked for Duan's assistance in saving the republic. Duan overthrew Zhang within two weeks, and restored the republic by 12 July; Duan himself was reinstated as premier by 14 July. Vice President Feng Guozhang was made acting president in Nanjing. On 17 July, distraught from recent events, Li officially resigned from office and moved to Tianjin in retirement.

He served again as president of China between 11 June 1922 and 13 June 1923 after Cao Kun forced out President Xu Shichang. Li was chosen because he was respected by all of the factions and was hoped to reunify the country. He accepted only with the private assurances that warlord forces be disbanded; they were never honored. Like his first term, he called back the original National Assembly but he was even more powerless than before. He organized the "Able Men Cabinet" consisting of prestigious experts but it became undone when he arrested the finance minister for graft after examining rumours and circumstantial evidence; a court threw out the charges. Cao soon harbored presidential ambitions himself and orchestrated strikes to force Li out of office. Cao went as far as trying to bribe the assembly into impeaching him. When Li was vacating the capital, he attempted to take the presidential seal with him but was intercepted. He fled to Japan for medical treatment and returned to Tianjin in 1924 where he later died. His tomb, built in 1935 and restored in 2011, is situated on campus of Central China Normal University in Wuhan. He married Wu Jingjun (1870–1930) and had four children.

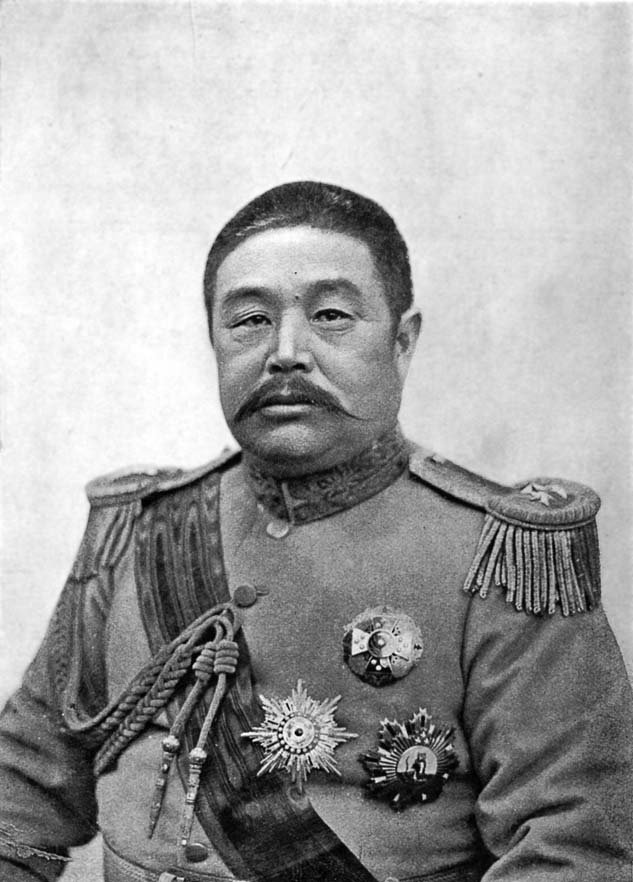
Li Yuanhong about 1917

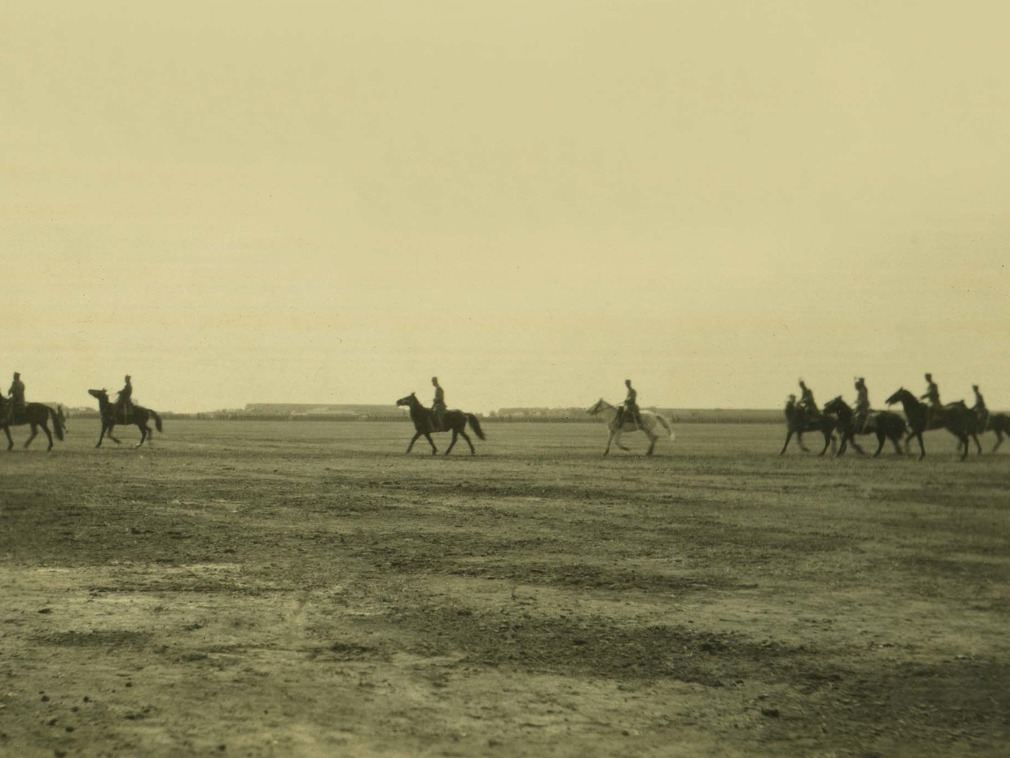
Li Yuanhong riding a horse and attending a parade

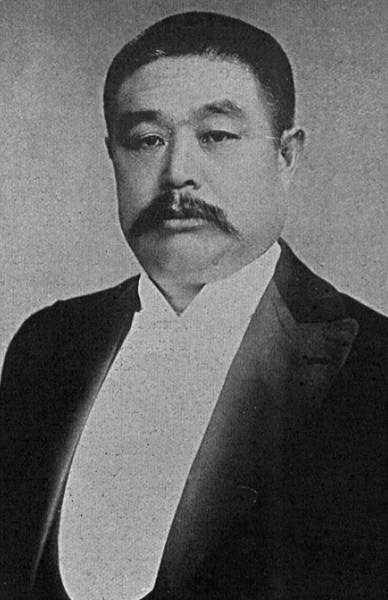
Li Yuanhong in civilian attire

== See also ==
- History of the Republic of China

Political offices
Preceded by Yuan Shikai	President of China; First term 1916–1917	Succeeded by Feng Guozhang
Preceded by Zhou Ziqi	President of China; Second term 1922–1923	Succeeded by Gao Lingwei
