= Manchurian nationalism =

Ethnic nationalism of the Manchu people of China

- Flag of Manchukuo, the historical state primarily associated with Manchurian nationalism

Chinese name
- Traditional Chinese: 滿洲民族主義
- Simplified Chinese: 满洲民族主义
Transcriptions
Standard Mandarin
- Hanyu Pinyin: Mǎnzhōu mínzú zhǔyì
- Wade–Giles: Man^{3}-chou^{1} min^{2}-tsu^{2} chu^{3}-i^{4}

Japanese name
- Kanji: 満州民族主義
Transcriptions
- Romanization: Manshū minzoku shugi

Manchurian nationalism or Manchu nationalism refers to the ethnic nationalism of the Manchu people or the territorial nationalism of the inhabitants of Manchuria, regardless of ethnic origin.

== Overview ==
While ruling China proper, the Manchu-led Qing dynasty had promoted a common, "Manchufying" identity among members of the Eight Banners, its primary military forces. Manchus were thus strongly associated with the Banner system, even though there were Mongol and Han Chinese Bannermen as well. The Banner identity was not yet racial or national, but still strongly divided the mostly Manchu Banner people from the primarily Han Chinese civilians of the Qing Empire. This divide grew with the overthrow of the Qing dynasty in 1912, and the foundation of the Republic of China. Thereafter, ethnic identity grew greatly in importance, and the Banner people had to decide whether to identify as Manchu, Han Chinese, or Mongol. Many of Mongol or Han Chinese ethnic origin opted to be classified as Manchu, especially in northern China, and the descendants of the Bannermen were generally called Manzu ("Manchu ethnic group") from then on.

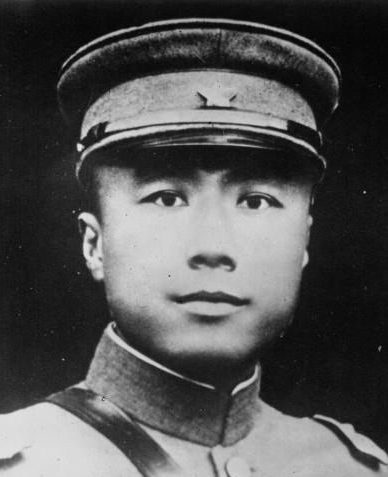
Xi Qia, a cabinet minister of the Manchukuo government and a leading Manchurian nationalist

As supporters of the old Qing dynasty, the Banner people (or Manchu-associated groups) were disempowered and discriminated against in the new Republic. Many Qing nobles thus started to conspire against the new authorities, and the idea of a Manchu/Manchurian nationalism grew in importance due to this development. One of the first attempts to create a Manchu polity was by Shanqi, the Prince Su, who tried to create a separatist state in Inner Mongolia with Japanese help in 1912. His venture was not driven by nationalism, however, but by a desire to see the monarchy under Puyi restored. In general, anti-Republican groups founded by Banner people, most prominently the Royalist Party, were initially more motivated by monarchism, conservatism, and revisionism than Manchu/Manchurian nationalism. Manchurian nationalism and independence were heavily promoted by the Empire of Japan, however, whose aim was to weaken and divide China. The Japanese Kwantung Army was already attempting to use the Royalist Party and Zhang Zuolin (who claimed descent from Han Chinese Bannermen) as early as 1916 to promote Manchurian independence. Following the Japanese invasion of Manchuria in 1931, Qing prince and Royalist Party associate Puwei travelled to Shenyang and called for the "Manchus to govern Manchuria" in cooperation with Japan. The Japanese did not accept his self-proclamation as leader of the Manchurian independence movement, however, and sidelined him after the foundation of Manchukuo.

The major and opportunistic involvement of Japan in the movement for Manchurian independence has led historian David Egler to describe Manchurian nationalism as "artificial". He argued that it was for the most part a propaganda tool to justify the Japanese intervention, occupation, and colonisation of Manchuria under the cornerstone of minzoku kyōwa (民族協和; lit. 'racial harmony') between Manchu, Han Chinese, Japanese and others in the region. With the foundation of Manchukuo, Manchurian nationalism became a territorial or inter-ethnic nationalism of all people living in Manchuria, and was no longer limited to Manchu people.

== See also ==
- Concordia Association
- Local ethnic nationalism
- Northeast China
- Royalist Party
- Tartary

== Bibliography ==
- Dickinson, Frederick R. (1999). War and National Reinvention: Japan in the Great War, 1914-1919. Cambridge, Massachusetts: Harvard University Press. ISBN 9780674005075.
- Egler, David George (1977). Japanese mass organizations in Manchuria, 1928-1945: the ideology of racial harmony (PDF). Tucson, Arizona: University of Arizona.
- Rhoads, Edward J. M. (2000). Manchus & Han: Ethnic Relations and Political Power in Late Qing and Early Republican China, 1861–1928. Seattle, London: University of Washington Press. ISBN 9780295997483.
