= Royalist Party =

Defunct monarchist party in China

Society for Monarchical Constitutionalism 君主立憲維持會
- Leader: Liangbi (1911–1912); Shanqi (c. 1916)
- Founded: December 1911
- Headquarters: Beijing (1911–1912)
- Ideology: Conservatism (Chinese); Manchurian nationalism; Monarchism; Qing royalism

Party flag

Royalist Party
- Traditional Chinese: 宗社黨
- Simplified Chinese: 宗社党
Transcriptions
Standard Mandarin
- Hanyu Pinyin: Zōng Shè Dǎng
- Wade–Giles: Tsung^{1} She^{4} Tang^{3}

Society for Monarchical Constitutionalism
- Traditional Chinese: 君主立憲維持會
- Simplified Chinese: 君主立宪维持会
Transcriptions
Standard Mandarin
- Hanyu Pinyin: Jūnzhǔ Lìxiàn Wéichí Huì
- Wade–Giles: Chün^{1}-chu^{3} Li^{4}-hsien^{4} Wei^{2}-ch'ih^{2} Hui^{4}

The Royalist Party (Chinese: 宗社黨), officially the Society for Monarchical Constitutionalism (Chinese: 君主立憲維持會), was a monarchist political party and militant organization active in China during the early Republican Era. Supported by the Empire of Japan, its members sought to restore the Chinese monarchy under the Qing dynasty by launching insurgencies and advocating the secession of Manchuria and Inner Mongolia from the rest of China. Although it largely lacked a firm structure and consisted of loosely tied factions, the Royalist Party played a major role in Chinese politics during the 1910s.

== Names ==
The Royalist Party was known by a variety of names, including the Manchu Loyalist Party, Restoration Party, Imperial Clan Party, Royal Clan Party, Reactionary Party, Party of the Ancestral Shrine of the Ruling Household, and Party of the Aisin Gioro Cult.

== History ==
=== Foundation and early activities ===
Having ruled China since the 17th century, the Manchu-led Qing dynasty started to collapse upon the Xinhai Revolution's outbreak in October 1911. Diehard Qing supporters refused to accept this, and "blind to the inevitable trend" toward the formation of a republic, founded the "Society for Monarchical Constitutionalism" (later known as the "Royalist Party") in December 1911. (Note: According to another source, the party was founded on 12 January 1912.) The society's purpose was to oppose republicanism, preserve the Qing dynasty as the ruling house of China, and prepare for a "final showdown" with the republicans. Its initial headquarters was a shrine for the Eight Banners, and many of its first members were Manchu bannermen, as well as princes, courtiers, and members of the Qing imperial clan. Its first leader was Imperial Guards General Liangbi, while other notable members included Shanqi (Prince Su), Puwei (Prince Gong), General Tieliang, Duke Tsai-tse and Yü-liang. They sold their collections of paintings and antiques to raise money for the anti-republican resistance. At the time, parts of the Royalist Party advocated for the foundation of a secessionist "Manchuria-Mongolia" state to at least preserve the monarchy in northern China. Gungsangnorbu, a probable Inner Mongolian Royalist Party member, was raising money for the Mongol independence movement amid the Mongolian Revolution of 1911.

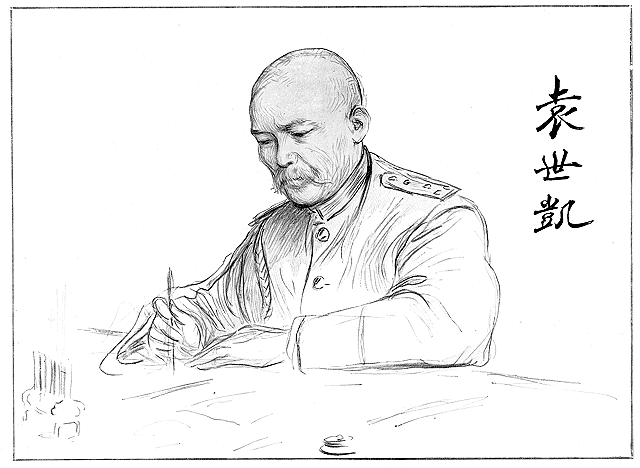
Yuan Shikai was among the most important opponents of the Royalist Party, first as a political rival during the Xinhai Revolution and later as President of China.

The situation for the Qing imperial government was increasingly undermined by military and political setbacks caused by the opposing republicans, and the Republic of China was proclaimed first in the country's south on 1 January 1912. The Qing court and its leading officials realised that their position was becoming untenable. The matter was discussed among the Qing princes during a conference on 17–20 January, where the Royalist Party's members took a hardline stance against any agreement which included the monarchy's abolition. Other princes believed that they had to yield to the republicans, while a large number remained neutral. The conference came to no real conclusion. Meanwhile, Yuan Shikai, a powerful Qing general who effectively controlled much of the army, was pushing for a compromise with the republicans. While Empress Dowager Longyu was ready to agree to Yuan's proposal and abdicate, the Qing hardliners strongly objected and became determined enemies of Yuan. By 23 January, their political situation had significantly improved: General Tieliang had managed to rally a significant number of Manchu officials to oppose the abdication, while General Feng Guozhang had claimed that he could crush the revolution if the royalists could provide him with sufficient sums of money, providing a morale boost to the hardliners.

The Royalist Party started to undermine Yuan, and managed to greatly weaken him by 25 January. The hardliners themselves suffered two major reversals on 26 January, however, when Liangbi was assassinated by a republican revolutionary and the Beiyang Army declared its support for the republicans. The Qing court accepted that it had no option other than abdication, while the Royalist Party members dispersed and fled into the foreign concessions. The court subsequently tried to cooperate fully with the new authorities in order to be left in peace, while Yuan Shikai became China's first president and de facto military dictator.

=== Buildup after the Republic's foundation ===
The Royalist Party was not finished, however, and its members continued to plot against the Republic. Hoping to build up a political base, the party attempted to rally public support for their cause, especially among the Manchu living in Manchuria and Beijing. Qing restorationism enjoyed genuine support in northeastern China, especially due to the failure of the first Republican government to restore stability to China. The royalists enlisted military officers and foreign powers in their conspiracies. Shanqi even gained Japanese support in 1912 for the creation of a separatist state in Inner Mongolia where Puyi could be restored as emperor. This venture eventually failed. The party also advocated that the Qing court be moved to Manchuria, but this proposal was "repressed" by the republican authorities.

The continued activism by the Royalist Party was widely perceived as grave threat to the Republic. It was feared that a civil war and consequent partition of China could result from the royalists becoming too strong. Despite this, President Yuan Shikai initially dealt with the party in a lenient manner. Having sidelined both republicans and monarchists, he was mostly concerned with maintaining his own power and warned the Qing court to keep its loyalists in check. Fearing that the Royalist Party's activity could cause a foreign intervention or the revocation of the court's favorable treatment, Empress Dowager Longyu ordered the party's dissolution in March 1912. Her order had no effect, but convinced the authorities that the royalists acted without the influence of the court. Having failed to disband the Royalist Party, Yuan consequently attempted to sway them to his side. He appointed Puyi's former tutor Xu Shichang as minister of state in an effort to gain their support.

=== Militant resistance against the Republic ===
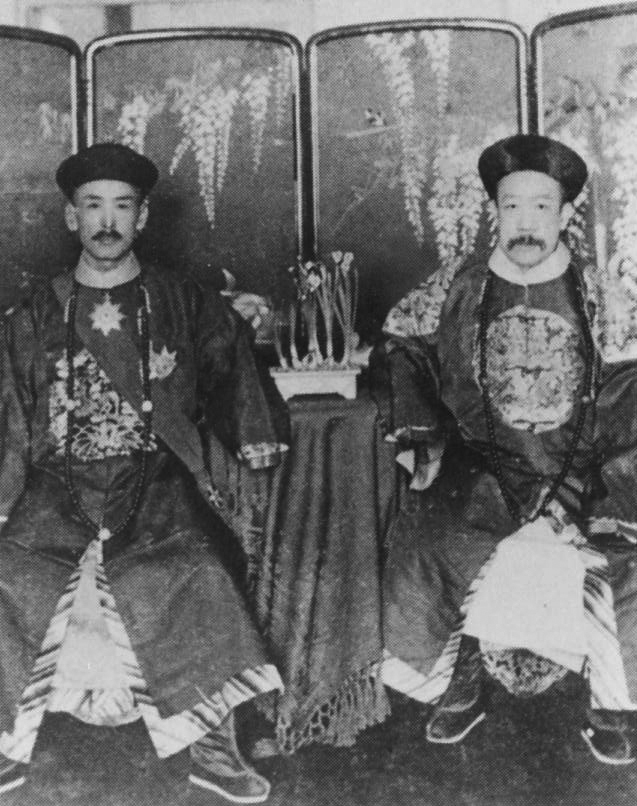
Royalist Party leader Shanqi (right) and his Japanese supporter Kawashima Naniwa (left).

The party became increasingly militant from March 1912, stirring up unrest in northern China. It tried to undermine President Yuan in any way possible to achieve the restoration of the monarchy. Royalist Party members spread anti-republican propaganda among the rural population, as well as Mongol nomads, and incited dissatisfied soldiers to mutiny. By April 1912, the party's Hubei branch had allied with the bandit Bai Lang and a number of secret societies. It launched an open rebellion, calling for the death of "all republican traitors" and the full restoration of the Qing dynasty. One of its most notable actions was to convince the New Army's 6th Henan Division to riot at Luoshan County in July 1912. In the provinces of Manchuria, Royalist Party members began recruiting and arming militants, and even produced cheques marked with "Great Qing Empire". Shanqi called upon Qing loyalists to join the armed resistance.

Yuan Shikai had already considered the Royalist Party a threat before these uprisings, also due to the rumoured membership of several prominent political figures such as Zhang Xun (Note: According to Madeleine Chi, Zhang was an "active member" of the party, while Phil Billingsley only reports that "rumor had it" that Zhang was affiliated with the party.) in the party. The president again offered reconciliation, and invited various Manchu princes to the funeral of Empress Dowager Longyu in Beijing on 27 February 1913 "to dispel the clouds of suspicion" on part of the Royalist Party. This stance changed when his republican opponents launched their own uprising, the "Second Revolution", in July 1913. Yuan used the revolution as an excuse for drastic actions against all his rivals, including the royalists. He declared martial law and had the Royalist Party leadership in Henan arrested and executed. Despite this, other parts of the party remained active, further influencing the campaign of Bai Lang. However, the bandit opted to abandon the declining monarchist cause later in 1913, and aligned with the anti-Yuan republicans.

By the time Yuan had declared the creation of his short-lived Empire of China, Shanqi had become the leader of the Royalist Party and was working with the Japanese to establish separatist movements in Inner Mongolia and Manchuria. It received support from the Japanese Kwantung Army and continental adventurers such as Kawashima Naniwa. In 1916, the Japanese and the Royalist Party were planning a rebellion in Manchuria, using Shanqi's private army which consisted partially of Mongolian bandits and had raided northern China up to this point. The royalists would capture Mukden, and then assist anti-Yuan forces in the National Protection War. There were also plans to coopt Manchurian military strongman Zhang Zuolin for this coup, as Zhang had already made overtures to the Royalist Party. However, Zhang never fully joined this conspiracy, and eventually issued warnings to his soldiers that they should be on guard for royalist attacks. As result of financial and political difficulties, the Mukden operation was eventually cancelled by Tanaka Giichi.

The Royalist Party's activities gradually became limited to Northeast China, and very few of its members (among them Puwei and Shen Zengjie) were involved in Zhang Xun's attempt to forcibly restore the Qing dynasty in 1917. Shen was appointed Minister of Education by Zhang, but when the restoration failed, he retired from politics completely. In the following years, Royalist Party members increasingly focused on issues relating to Manchuria, arguing that an independent monarchy located there could provide the local people with better living conditions. Following the Japanese invasion of Manchuria in 1931, Puwei proclaimed himself the head of the Manchurian independence movement and candidate for ruler of Manchukuo. Nevertheless, the Japanese appointed Puyi as Chief Executive (later Emperor) of the new state.

== Ideology ==
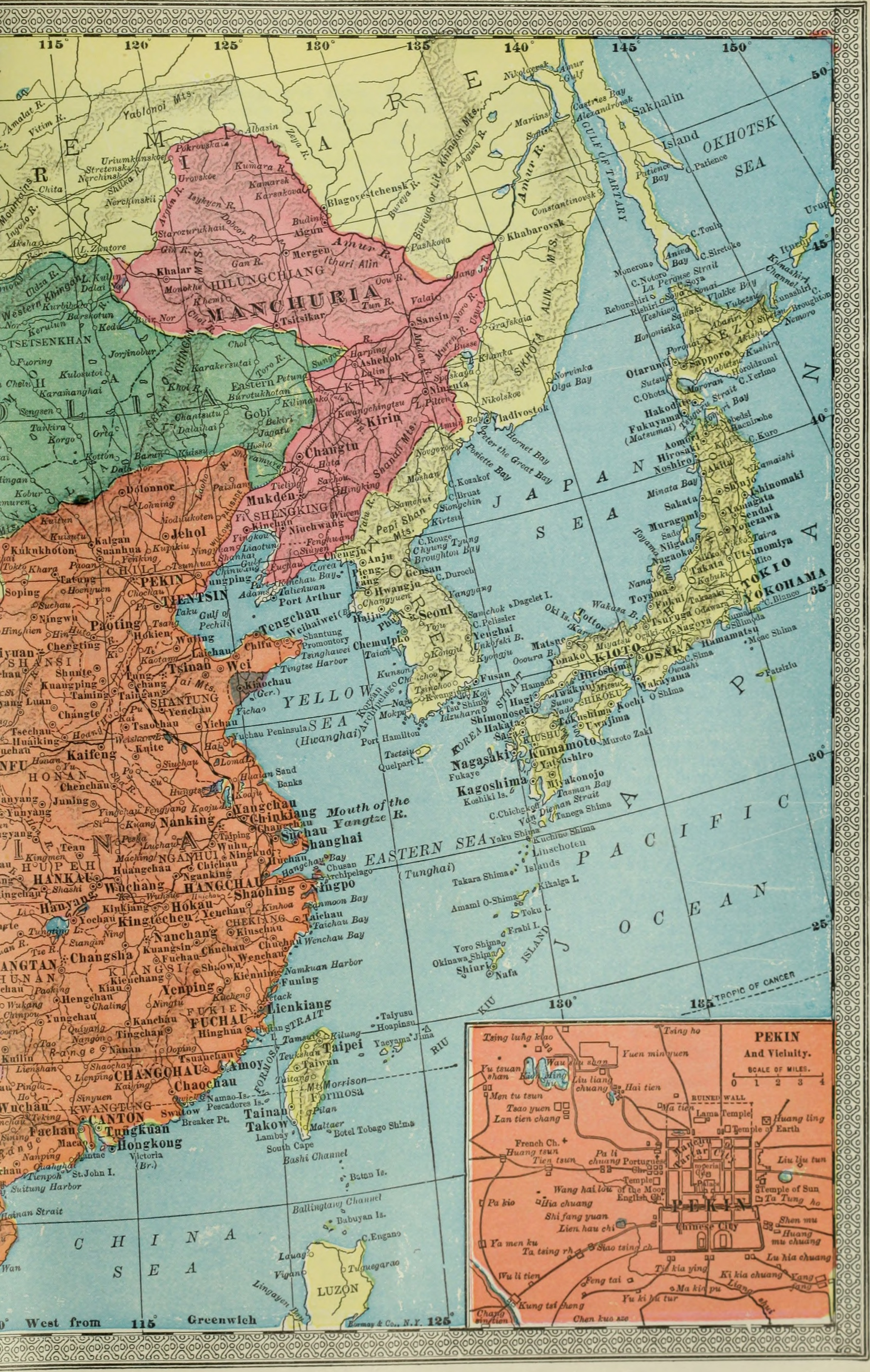
Elements of the Royalist Party supported the independence of Manchuria (pink) and Inner Mongolia (green), possibly as a unified state.

The Royalist Party's official purpose was to preserve the Qing dynasty's ancestral shrine and other religious institutions, though in truth it tried to protect the monarchy, and later aimed to overthrow the Republic. Qing loyalists generally believed that it was only a matter of time until the republican "experiment" failed. By 1912, the party was divided into two factions. Though both aimed for the restoration of the monarchy and were united in their opposition to Yuan Shikai, the factions differed on certain points. The "extremists" were only ready to accept the Manchu Qing dynasty as rulers of China, whereas the moderates believed that another Manchu or Han Chinese dynasty would also be acceptable.

Elements of the party supported the creation of an independent Manchuria and Inner Mongolia as early as December 1911, and separatism gained more followers among the royalists as time went on. The royalists believed that Manchuria could offer them a secure base from where they could not only revive Imperial rule, but also protect themselves from counter-attacks by republicans from other parts of China. Initially, the local population of bannermen and Mongols was also sympathetic to their struggle. In the 1910s, appeals for separatism were still largely tied to the concept of "loyalty to the emperor", a cause which found more support among the multiethnic population of northeastern China than nationalist ideas. However, nationalist concepts later gained more traction in the Royalist Party, as many Manchus and bannermen suffered under discrimination in the new Republic. By the 1930s, Qing restorationists framed their struggle for an independent Manchuria as a chance at creating "a better place for the Manchus and banner people to live".

The Qing loyalists also exhibited conservative and revisionist tendencies, as they continued to use the old dynastic calendar, and espoused traditional arts such as Classical Chinese poetry, and calligraphy. One of the most notable intellectuals of the Royalist Party, ex-Qing official and scholar Shen Zengjie, co-founded the Confucian Society of Shanghai.
