= Cabinet of Prince Qing =

First cabinet in Chinese history

- 1st Cabinet of China

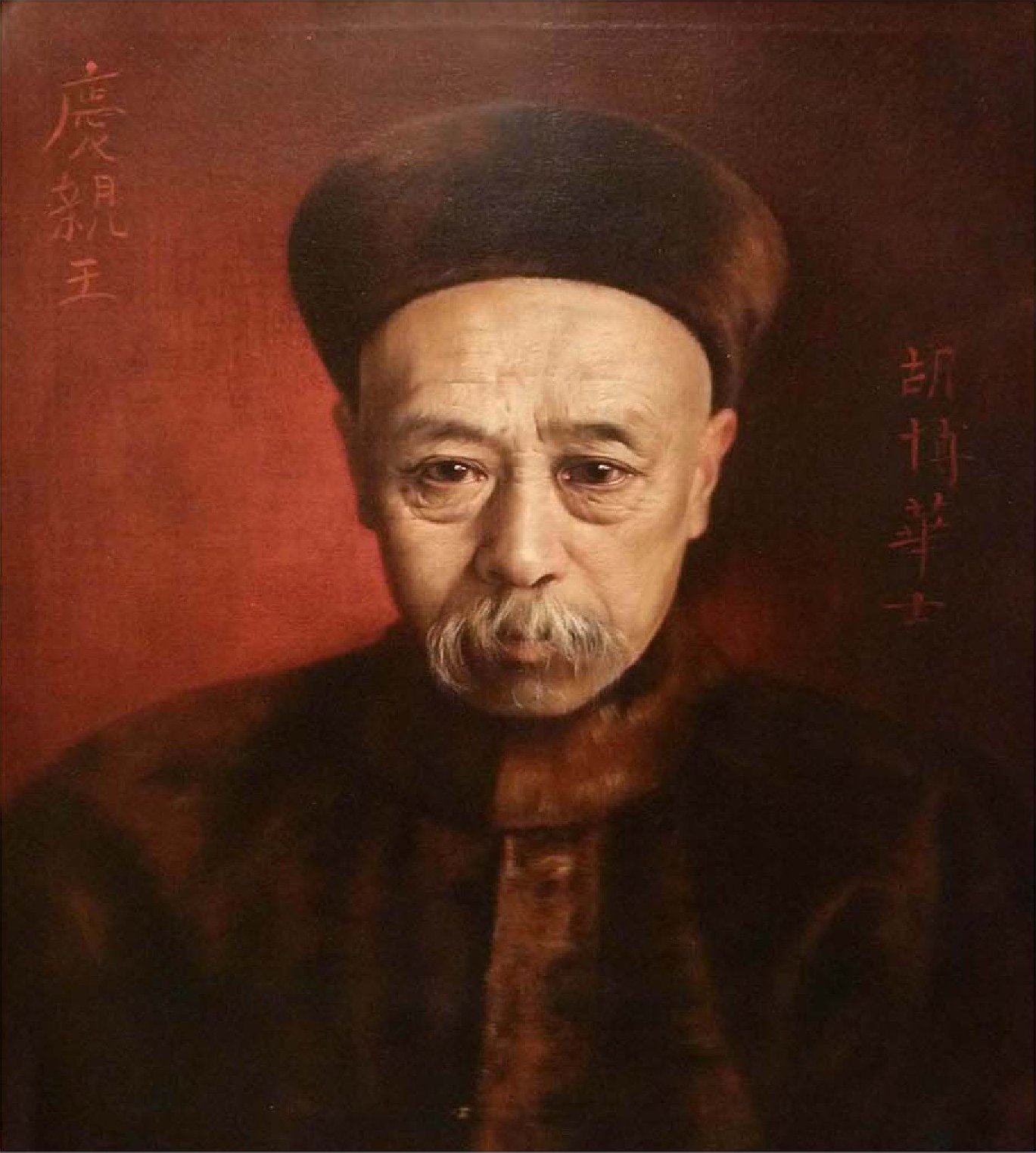
- Date formed: 8 May 1911
- Date dissolved: 1 November 1911

People and organisations
- Head of state: Xuantong Emperor
- Head of government: Prince Qing
- No. of ministers: 13

History
- Election: Appointed by the Emperor
- Predecessor: None
- Successor: Yuan Shikai's Cabinet

The Cabinet of Prince Qing (庆亲王内阁; 慶親王內閣; Qìng Qīnwáng Nèigé) was the first cabinet of the Qing dynasty and of China, formed as part of the Qing state's reforms to create a constitutional monarchy in the early 20th century. It was active from 8 May to 1 November 1911, led by the Prime Minister of the Imperial Cabinet, Yikuang (Prince Qing). It initially consisted of thirteen members, of which nine were Manchus (seven of whom were from the imperial clan) while only four were Han Chinese. As a result, it remained unpopular among the people and was nicknamed the "Princes' Cabinet" or "Imperial Family Cabinet"(皇族内阁; 皇族內閣; Huángzú Nèigé) by its critics.

== History ==
The Imperial Cabinet was formed as a result of the constitutional reforms, the New Policies, being enacted in China in the early 20th century. It replaced the Grand Council, although it was unpopular and was described as "the old Grand Council under the name of a cabinet, autocracy under the name of constitutionalism."

Members of the provisional assemblies, which were formed in 1908–09, protested against the formation of this cabinet. On 12 May, the Federation of Provincial Assemblies declared that imperial princes should not serve as premiers and that the Princes' Cabinet is not compatible with a constitutional monarchy. On 5 July, over 40 legislators submitted a petition to form a new cabinet. The imperial court responded with an edict which stated that assemblymen should not interfere with the appointment and dismissal of officials.

The Princes' Cabinet was dissolved in November 1911 when Prince Qing resigned and his ally, general Yuan Shikai, was appointed prime minister in his place, establishing the Yuan Cabinet.

== Composition ==
The following is the list of cabinet ministers. Unless otherwise noted, their term began on 8 May and ended on 1 November when the cabinet was dismissed.

Office	Name	Portrait	Ethnicity	Notes
Prime Minister	Yikuang, Prince Qing 慶親王 奕劻		Manchu	
Minister of the Cabinet	Natong 那桐		Manchu	
Minister of the Cabinet	Xu Shichang 徐世昌		Han Chinese	
Minister of Foreign Affairs	Liang Dunyan 梁敦彥		Han Chinese	
Minister of Internal Affairs	Shanqi, Prince Su 肅親王 善耆		Manchu	Appointed on April 10
Minister of Internal Affairs	Guichun 桂春		Manchu	Acting
Minister of Internal Affairs	Zhao Bingjun 趙秉鈞		Han Chinese	Appointed in early October
Minister of Finance	Zaize, Grace Defender Duke 奉恩鎮國公 載澤		Manchu	
Minister of Education	Tang Jingchong 唐景崇		Han Chinese	
Minister of the Army	Yinchang 蔭昌		Manchu	
Minister of the Navy	Zaixun, Prince Rui 瑞郡王 載洵		Manchu	
Minister of Justice	Gioro Shaochang 覺羅紹昌		Manchu	
Minister of Agriculture, Industry, and Commerce	Pulun, Beile-ranked beise 貝子加貝勒銜 溥倫		Manchu	
Minister of Mail and Communications	Sheng Xuanhuai 盛宣懷		Han Chinese	
Minister of Mail and Communications	Tang Shaoyi 唐紹儀		Han Chinese	Appointed on September 5
Minister of the Lifan Yuan	Shouqi 壽耆		Manchu	
Minister of the Lifan Yuan	Shanqi, Prince Su 肅親王 善耆		Manchu	Appointed on June 21
