= Premier Tang =

Premier Tang may refer to:

- Tang Fei (born 1932), 16th Premier of the Republic of China
- Tang Shaoyi (1862-1938), 1st Premier of the Republic of China
