= Premier Zhao =

Premier Zhao may refer to:

- Zhao Bingjun (1859–1914), third premier of the Republic of China
- Zhao Ziyang (1919–2005), third premier of the People's Republic of China
