= Feng Guozhang =

Chinese general and politician (1859–1919)

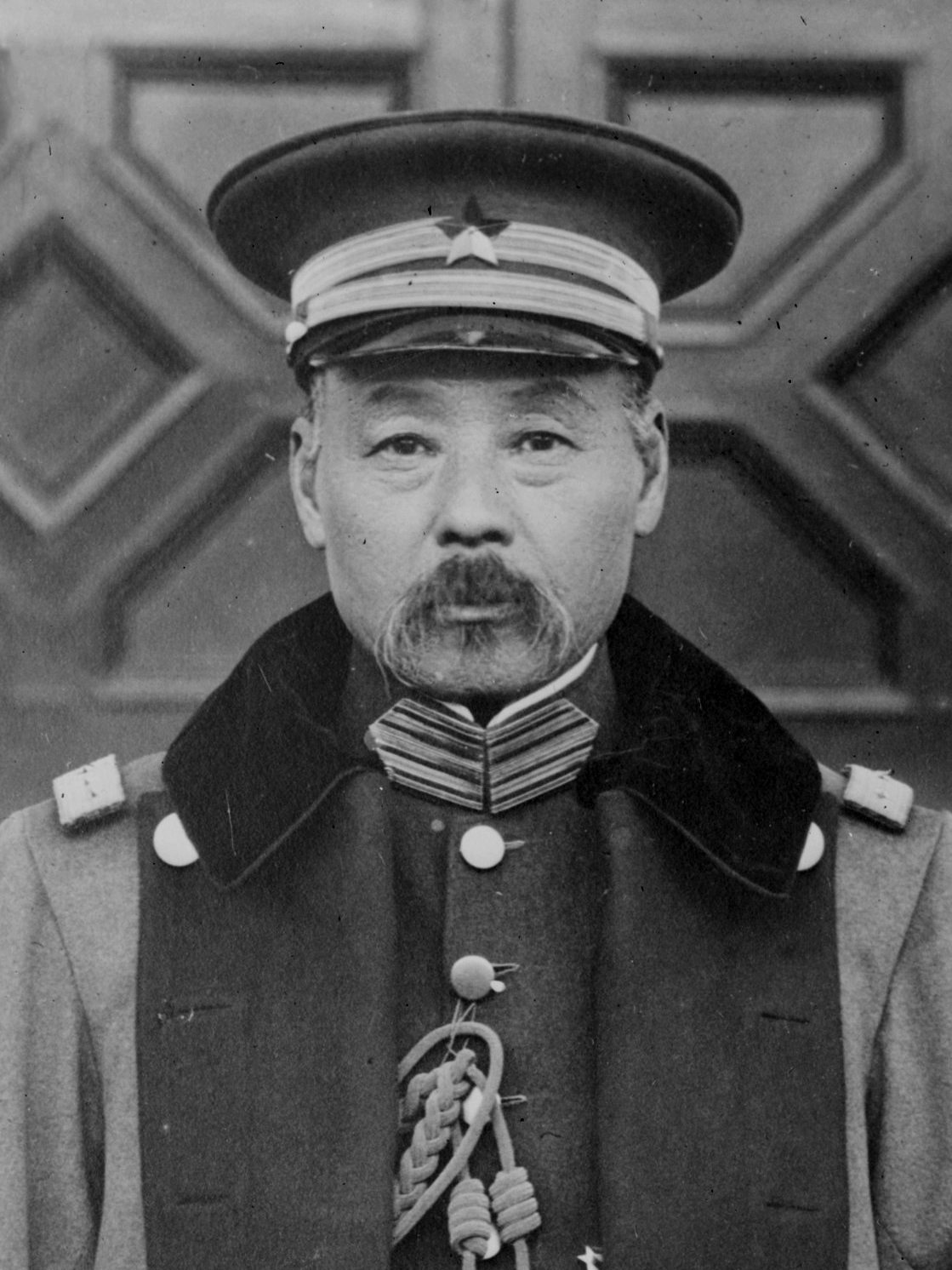
- Feng, c. 1915–1919

President of China Acting
- In office 6 August 1917 – 10 October 1918
- Preceded by: Li Yuanhong
- Succeeded by: Xu Shichang

Vice President of China
- In office 7 June 1916 – 1 July 1917
- President: Li Yuanhong
- Preceded by: Li Yuanhong
- Succeeded by: Post abolished

Governor of Jiangsu
- In office 16 December 1913 – 1 August 1917
- Preceded by: Zhang Xun
- Succeeded by: Li Chun

Governor of Zhili
- In office 8 September 1912 – 16 December 1913
- Preceded by: Zhang Xiluan
- Succeeded by: Zhao Bingjun

Personal details
- Born: 7 January 1859 Hejian, Zhili, Qing dynasty
- Died: 12 December 1919 (aged 60) Beijing, China
- Party: Zhili clique
- Other political affiliations: Progressive Party
- Education: Tianjin Military Academy
- Awards: Order of Rank and Merit; Order of the Precious Brilliant Golden Grain; Order of Wen-Hu

Military service
- Allegiance: Qing dynasty; Republic of China
- Branch/service: Huai Army; Beiyang Army
- Years of service: 1886–1919
- Rank: General
- Battles/wars: First Sino-Japanese War; Boxer Rebellion; 1911 Revolution; Second Revolution; National Protection War

Feng Guozhang (simplified Chinese: 冯国璋; traditional Chinese: 馮國璋; pinyin: Féng Guózhāng; Wade–Giles: Feng Kuo-chang; 7 January 1859 – 12 December 1919) was a Chinese general and politician in the late Qing dynasty and early republican China who served as the acting president of China from 1917 to 1918. He had also served as the vice president from 1916 to 1917, the governor of Jiangsu from 1913 to 1917, and the governor of Zhili from 1912 to 1913. He emerged as one of the senior commanders of the Beiyang Army and was the founder of the Zhili clique, one of the main factions during the Warlord Era in China.

Feng was a first degree holder of the imperial examination and graduated from the Tianjin Military School. He served in northeastern China before and during the First Sino-Japanese War, and afterward was China's military attaché to Japan in 1895. His reports on the Japanese military reforms were brought to the attention of Yuan Shikai, who made Feng an officer in what later became the Beiyang Army. Feng rose through the ranks during the last decade of the Qing dynasty, serving as a division commander, the director of the military school for Manchu princes and nobles, and as the superintendent of the General Staff Council.

He led Beiyang Army troops against the Wuchang Uprising during the 1911 Revolution, and under his command they retook the cities of Hankou and Hanyang from the rebels. By that time Yuan Shikai, the prime minister, started negotiating with the revolutionaries and later arranged the Qing emperor's abdication. In the early Republic of China, Feng Guozhang became the governor of Zhili from 1912 to 1913 and then governor of Jiangsu from 1913 to 1917. By the time of Yuan's death, he and Duan Qirui were considered the most powerful generals in the Beiyang Army.

== Early life and career ==
Feng Guozhang was born to a peasant family in Hejian, Zhili on 7 January 1859. His family had fallen on hard times and was forced to sell its properties to educate its sons; however being the fourth son, Feng was unable to complete his education due to costs. Despite this, he had been able to receive some education in the Confucian Chinese classics in preparation for the imperial examination. He reportedly had to survive part of his early life by playing the violin in theatres, before in 1886 becoming an orderly to one of his great-uncles, a battalion commander in Li Hongzhang's Huai Army. His relative recommended him as a good student to Li's Tianjin Military Academy, and he did well there during his first year. The academy was part of Li Hongzhang's effort to create a modernized army in China, teaching subjects such as military drill, engineering, surveying, and mathematics, as opposed to traditional Chinese literary examinations or physical tests.

In 1888 Feng took a break from his studies there to take and pass the shengyuan or basic degree exam, but later he failed the juren or provincial exam, at which point he decided to return to the military academy. He graduated from the Tianjin academy in 1890. Feng Guozhang was briefly an instructor at the military academy in Tianjin until 1891, when he was assigned to Nie Shicheng's unit in Port Arthur, northeast China. During that time he traveled extensively across Manchuria and became familiar with the region's geography, which became useful when he was serving under the command of Nie Shicheng in the First Sino-Japanese War of 1894–95. After the war, Feng was recommended by Nie Shicheng to serve as military attaché to Japan when Yukeng was sent there by the Qing dynasty as the Chinese minister in Tokyo.

While he was in Japan in 1895, Feng became acquainted with notable Japanese army officers, such as Fukushima Yasumasa, who was later the director of the Imperial Japanese Army Academy. He spent several months observing the Japanese military modernization program, especially their training methods, and recorded this information in a notebook that he later gave to Nie Shicheng, who sent it to Yuan Shikai. Yuan, who was at that time organizing his Newly Created Army (the future Beiyang Army), was impressed with Feng's work and appointed him to be the head of training on his staff. From 1896 Feng Guozhang was part of the officer corps of this brigade-size force, which became the nucleus of the Beiyang Army and also included other prominent future leaders.

When the Boxer Rebellion broke out in 1899 and Yuan Shikai was appointed as governor of Shandong to maintain order in that province, Feng was also there and was tasked with taking part in the suppression of Boxer rebels near the province's border with Zhili. After the Eight Nation Alliance suppressed the rebellion and Yuan Shikai was appointed Viceroy of Zhili in 1901, he started establishing military schools at Baoding, which became known as the Baoding Military Academy. Feng Guozhang had a major role in founding the academy as the director of training and instruction at the Zhili provincial military department.

== Qing dynasty general ==
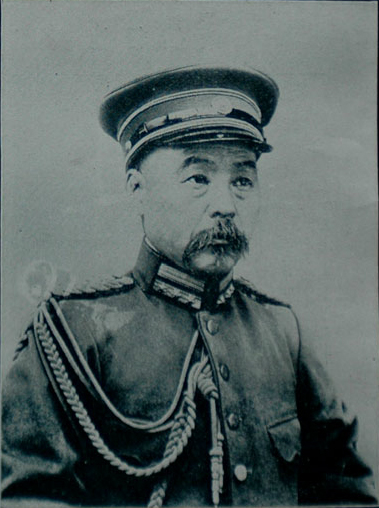
Feng Guozhang in the Qing dynasty general uniform, 1911

During the last decade of the Qing dynasty his career took off, and he became one of Yuan Shikai's closest allies. Feng Guozhang served on the Military Training Bureau of the Army Reorganization Commission that was created in December 1903. After the Beiyang Army was expanded in 1904–05, Feng became the commander of the Beiyang 3rd Division in 1905, the commander of the 6th Division in 1906, and the superintendent of the General Staff Council in July 1907. The latter position made him the director of the main administrative agency of the new Ministry of the Army, and his role also included advising the New Army divisions being formed across China on matters of training and organization.

In addition, he was also the director of the Military School for Princes and Nobles from January 1906, and in that role was given the rank of acting deputy lieutenant general of the Mongol Plain Yellow Banner. It was a military middle school that mostly accepted sons of Manchu hereditary princes, imperial clan members, and military or civil officials. Feng Guozhang had good relations with the Manchu imperial court as well as with Yuan, and was also an acquaintance of the Manchu nobleman Tieliang, having gone with him on his trip to Japan in 1903. When Yuan Shikai was removed as Beiyang Army commander in 1907 and then dismissed from all posts in 1908, Feng remained in his influential position on the General Staff Council. In July 1909 it was reformed as the General Staff Office, separate from the Ministry of the Army and answering directly to the emperor, to follow the Prussian model rather than the French model. Two Manchu princes, Zaitao and Yulang, were placed in charge of it by the prince regent, Prince Chun. But they were inexperienced in military affairs and Feng was kept in a subordinate position to them as a military specialist.

After the Wuchang Uprising broke out in Hubei on 10 October 1911 with New Army soldiers, the Beiyang Army was sent by the Qing to put down the rebellion. On 14 October Feng was appointed by the imperial court to command the 2nd Corps, consisting of two divisions and one brigade, which was held in reserve. On the 27th, he replaced the Manchu noble Yinchang as the commander of the 1st Corps, which had been deployed to lead the attack on the rebels at the city of Hankou, by the imperial court at the request of Yuan Shikai. Yuan had been named the commissioner of all imperial forces in Hubei by Prince Chun, and appointed his old associates Feng and Duan Qirui to lead the 1st and 2nd Corps, respectively. Feng arrived and took command on 30 October, as troops under Yinchang's command were completing their takeover of Hankou from the republicans, and oversaw the assault against some holdouts in a district along the Yangtze river, opposite of Hanyang. Fires caused by artillery during the attack destroyed many buildings in the city and turned much of the population into refugees. The assault was a military success and forced the remaining rebels to cross the river to Hanyang by 1 November, but Feng's actions caused protests from the National Assembly.

After this Yuan Shikai ordered Feng to wait before attacking Hanyang and Wuchang, ostensibly because the army needed rest, but in reality Yuan wanted to make use of the developing situation to negotiate with the Qing. Uprisings had broken out in several other provinces of the empire by the time Hankou was retaken by the Beiyang Army. After a break of two weeks, during which political reform was being discussed, Feng's troops fought off a rebel counterattack on 17 November and then crossed the Yangtze into Hanyang on the 20th using pontoon bridges built by his engineers. They retook the entire city on 27 November after a week of intense combat, and Feng made a second class baron by the imperial court. Yuan Shikai, who was in talks with the revolutionary leader Li Yuanhong, ordered Feng not to proceed to Wuchang. At the end of 1911 Feng was ordered to leave the front, with Duan Qirui assuming command of the 1st Corps, and return to Beijing. In the last days of the Qing dynasty, Yuan Shikai replaced the Manchu prince Zaitao as commander of the 3rd Corps, consisting of the 1st Division and the Imperial Guards, with Feng taking his place, because he was on good terms with the Manchu officers from his previous experience. Feng also expressed regret at the abdication of the Xuantong Emperor and made sure that the Manchus' demand for the good treatment of the imperial household was included in the letter of abdication. The Imperial Guard would become part of his power base in later years.

== Rise to power ==
Feng broke with Yuan Shikai when he later attempted to make himself emperor. Yuan Shikai made Feng a duke, but Feng declined. Yuan then sent an admiral to assassinate Feng but the admiral was himself murdered. Feng then moved to Nanjing, where he joined the National Protection War. His name was prominently missing from the list of proposed successors in Yuan's will.

Feng then served as vice president under Li Yuanhong. During the occupation of Beijing by Zhang Xun, Feng served as acting president, a position he kept when Li formally resigned.

He was sworn in as president of the Republic of China on August 1, 1917, but his constitutionality was challenged as the National Assembly was not reconvened to recognize it.

On August 14 China entered World War I on the side of the Allies after growing evidence of the German Empire's support for Zhang's coup was uncovered, as well as intense lobbying by Premier Duan Qirui. He sent about 135,000 men in labor battalions to the Western Front, Mesopotamia and German East Africa. Troops were sent into Russia to assist the Allied intervention in Russia's civil war. Sun Yat-sen set up a rival government in Guangzhou during September 1917 and also declared war later that month in a failed attempt to get international recognition. Feng wanted to peacefully resolve the north-south conflict, which led to Duan resigning in protest. Due to pressure from the Anhui clique, he brought Duan back into the premiership. Feng finished the five-year term started by Yuan in 1913 on October 10, 1918, and died in Beijing of illness.

He was given a state funeral and buried in his native Hejian county of Cangzhou, Hebei. Half a century later his tomb was desecrated during the Cultural Revolution.

== See also ==
- List of warlords
- Warlord Era
- Zhili clique
- History of the Republic of China

== Sources ==
- Boorman, Howard L.; Howard, Richard C., eds. (1968). Biographical Dictionary of Republican China. Vol. II. New York: Columbia University Press. ISBN 0-231-08957-0.
- Gray, Jack (2002). Rebellions and Revolutions: China from the 1800s to 2000. New York: Oxford University Press. pp. 168–169. ISBN 978-0-19-870069-2.
- Mackinnon, Stephen R. (1973). "The Peiyang Army, Yuan Shih-K'ai, and the Origins of Modern Chinese Warlordism". The Journal of Asian Studies. 32 (3): 405–423. doi:10.2307/2052681. JSTOR 2052681.
- Powell, Ralph L. (1955). The Rise of Chinese Military Power 1895–1912. Princeton: Princeton University Press. ISBN 978-0-8046-1645-4.
- Rhoads, Edward J. M. (2000). Manchus and Han: Ethnic Relations and Political Power in Late Qing and Early Republican China, 1861–1928. Seattle: University of Washington Press. ISBN 978-0-295-99748-3.
- Setzekorn, Eric (2018). The Rise and Fall of an Officer Corps: The Republic of China Military, 1942–1955. Norman: University of Oklahoma Press. ISBN 978-0-8061-6296-6.

Political offices
Preceded by Li Yuanhong	President of China; 1917–1918	Succeeded by Xu Shichang
