= Yinchang =

Chinese military officer (1859–1928 or 1934)

- 廕昌
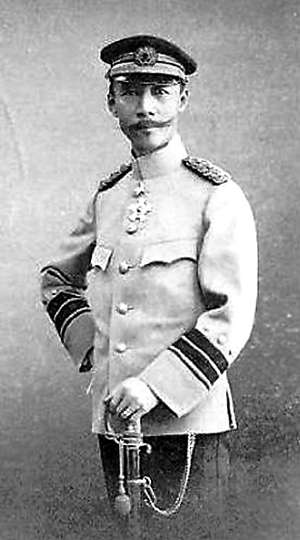

Minister of War of the Great Qing
- In office 1910–1911
- Monarch: Xuantong Emperor
- Prime Minister: Yikuang, Prince Qing
- Preceded by: Tieliang
- Succeeded by: Wang Shizhen

Chinese Minister to Germany
- In office 1901–1905
- Preceded by: Liu Haihuan
- Succeeded by: Yang Sheng
- In office 1908–1910
- Preceded by: Sun Baoqi
- Succeeded by: Liang Cheng

Personal details
- Born: 1859 Qing dynasty
- Died: 1928 or 1934 (aged 68–69 or 75–76) Beijing, (Republic of China (1912–1949)) Republic of China
- Awards: Order of the Double Dragon

Military service
- Allegiance: Qing dynasty (Republic of China (1912–1949)) Republic of China
- Branch/service: Beiyang Army
- Rank: Marshal
- Unit: Wuwei Corps
- Commands: Commander-in-Chief of the Imperial forces
- Battles/wars: Xinhai Revolution

Yinchang or In-ch'ang (simplified Chinese: 荫昌; traditional Chinese: 廕昌; pinyin: Yìnchāng; 1859 –1928 or 1934) (Note: Yinchang is his personal name. In Yinchang's time, most Manchus did not use their family name.) was a Chinese military official, ambassador to Germany, and educational reformer in the Qing dynasty and the Republic of China. He was appointed the nation's first Minister of War in the late Qing dynasty. During the Republic era he served as the military Chief of Staff for all presidents of the Beiyang Government. He was ethnic Manchu, and his family belonged to the Plain White Banner Clan of the Manchu Military Organization (滿洲正白旗); he held the title of Prince of the Plain White Banner Clan headed by Prince Chun, Zaifeng; at court he was addressed as Wu-lou (五/午楼). His Chinese surname was Yú (毓).

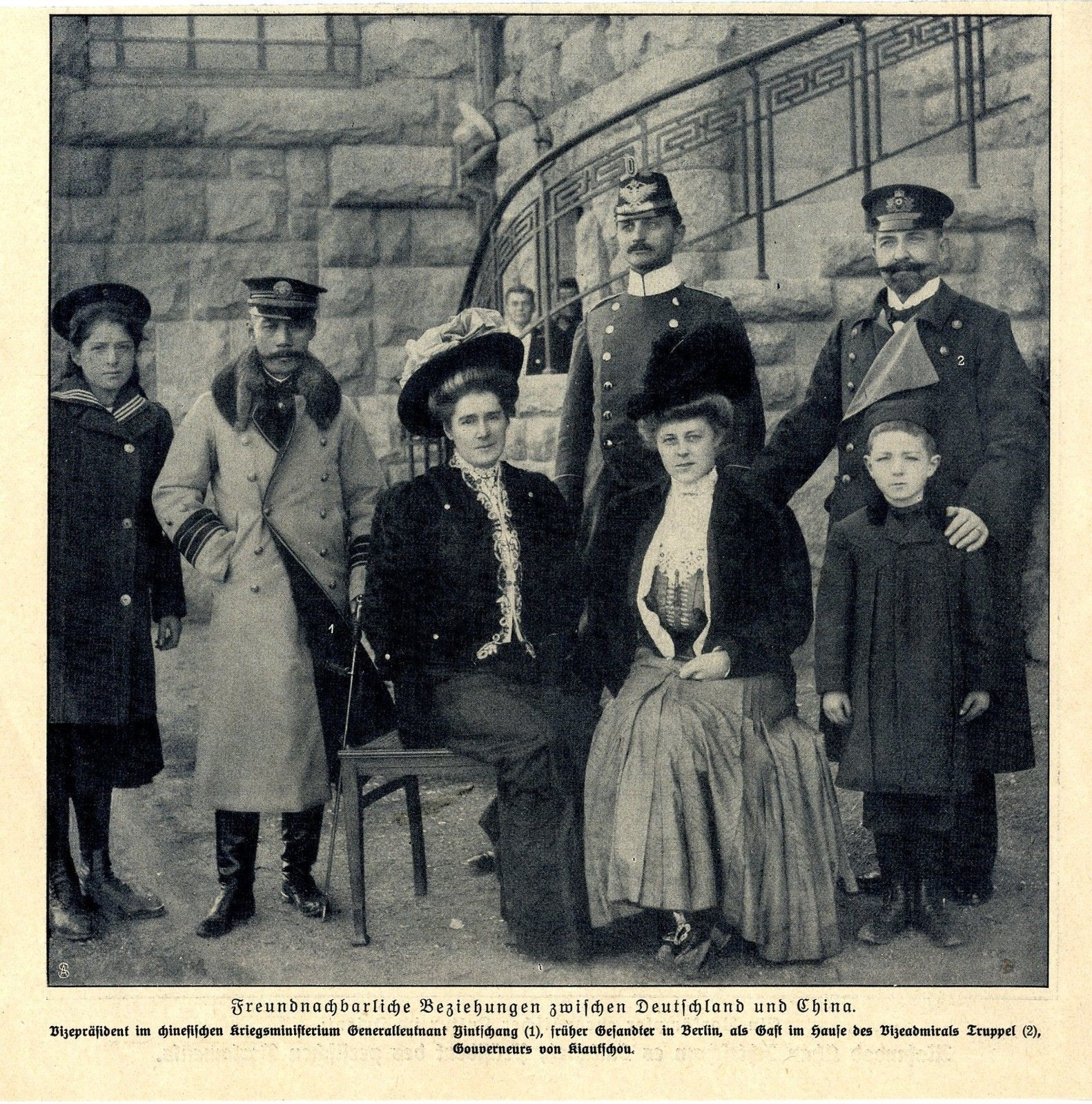
Yinchang with German Kiautschou Bay concession Governor Truppel in Qingdao

== Education in Germany ==
Originally, Yinchang was a student of the Guozijian, and by 1872 he was studying German at the Tongwen Guan, Beijing.

In 1877, he was sent to Germany as an attaché to the recently established Chinese Embassy in Berlin which had offices in Vienna and Amsterdam. On his arrival in Berlin he was not fluent with spoken German and changed from a 3rd to 4th class translator. Yinchang quickly compensated for this deficiency by mastering High German as well as the Berlin vernacular and the colloquial language of the imperial grenadiers. Georg von der Gabelentz, the founding father of German sinology, acknowledged his friendship with Yinchang in the introduction of his 1883 publication "Chinesische Grammatik", praising Yinchang's work in reviewing the book's manuscripts as well as his command of German grammar. While in Berlin, Yinchang took a German wife, with whom he had a daughter.

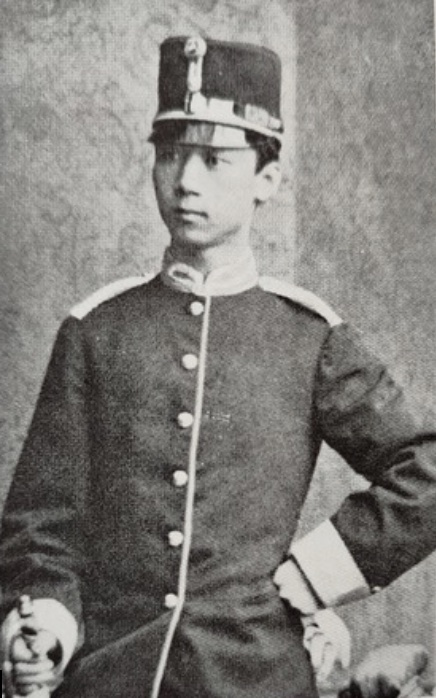
Yinchang, Lieutenant in the 84th Austrian Infantry Regiment May 24, 1883

In 1879 Yinchang enrolled in the Royal Prussian Military Academy in Groß-Lichterfelde for four years. He studied military science at the same time as fellow student Crown Prince Wilhelm II. His studies would have a formative influence, decisive for his later career. During this time he was first introduced to the Krupp family, producers of ammunition and armament, and cultivated a friendship with them. To further his military training, Yinchang was sent as a Lieutenant to the 84th Austrian Infantry Regiment stationed in Vienna under the command of Baron von Bauer in 1883. He became an enthusiastic adherent of the Viennese way of life.

== Chinese Ambassador to Germany ==
=== In China ===
==== Tianjin and Shandong ====
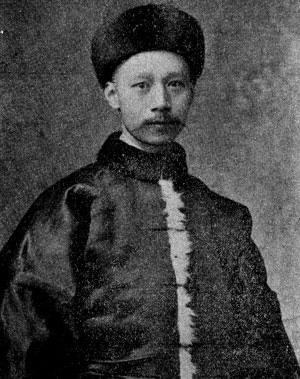
August 15, 1891, Beijing. Hauptmann Friedrich Heyer von Rosenfeld Archives

Yinchang was recalled to China in 1884 and initially assigned to the Tianjin Naval Academy; however in December he was summoned to Beijing to serve as translator for the German military envoy to the Emperor. By June 1885 Yinchang was appointed an instructor in military science at the Tianjin Military Academy (天津武備學堂), where he introduced German officers to teach the study and practice of German military techniques. The following year he was promoted to superintendent of the academy. The future President of the Republic of China, Feng Guozhang, was a student under his direction. When Yinchang returned to China, he was reunited with his young Manchu wife, the product of his family's pre-arranged marriage.

After the First Sino-Japanese War, Germany entered the negotiations of the Treaty of Shimonoseki, and used the assassination of two German missionaries to claim the Kiautschou Bay Leased Territory in Shandong Province. In 1898, Prince Heinrich of Prussia, with his East Asia Naval Squadron, sailed into Tianjin. Yinchang was summoned to negotiate German claims on the region of Kiaochow Bay and the port of Qingdao. Yinchang turned Prince Heinrich's mission into a diplomatic rather than military success, by making him the first foreign potentate to be received by the Imperial Court. In the winter of 1899, Yinchang headed the negotiations with Germany for railway and mining rights in Shandong province, and the concession in Qingdao. His negotiations became part of the Boxer Protocol, signed on September 7, 1901, in Beijing. Subsequently, these terms were integrated into the Tianjin Protocol, which in 1918 became part of the peace treaty with Germany that ended World War I.

==== Boxer Rebellion ====
During the Boxer Rebellion, when the troops of the Eight-Nation Alliance stormed Beijing to relieve the besieged Legations, Yinchang, with his German-equipped soldiers, escorted the Emperor Guangxu and the Empress Dowager Cixi to safety through the back gates of the Forbidden City into the safety of Shaanxi Province, where the foreigners could not reach them. In 1899 he became a staff officer of the Wuwei Corps (or Guards Army), a foreign-trained force under the command of Grand Councilor Ronglu. In 1901 Yinchang was named Lieutenant-General of the Plain White Banner Garrison (正白旗漢軍副都統) That August 1901 he was appointed the Chinese Ambassador to Germany (Berlin). Additionally, in September 1901, by Imperial Edict,

=== In Germany ===
Yinchang was charged with accompanying Prince Chun to Germany with the special mission to convey China's regret to Kaiser Wilhelm II for the murder of Baron Clemens von Ketteler during the Boxer Rebellion. The mission proved an unexpected success, with Prince Chun, the first member of the Imperial family to venture outside China, eagerly awaited by curious, enthusiastic crowds. After some negotiation the Kaiser accorded Prince Chun a splendid reception and delighted with the young prince, invited him to review the military maneuvers of 50,000 troops in Danzig. The international press covered his every step and his popularity created some anxiety in the Empress Dowager causing her to curtail the rest of his European tour.

As ambassador Yinchang was a polyglot, brought up speaking Manchu and Chinese (Mandarin), and in addition to his mastery of German, he knew French, the diplomatic language, and English. The Kaiser and his court were charmed by his command of the Berlin dialect making him a popular figure. During Ambassador Yinchang's time in Germany, it has been noted in Ambassadorial reports that he was the Kaiser's occasional drinking companion. Kaiser Wilhelm II was interested in the problems of modernizing a country's military forces. The Kaiser taught Yinchang much about the organization, training, discipline, and the equipment of a modern army. Also during this time, Yinchang was asked to step in as ambassador to the Netherlands for a term. Back in Germany he arranged a state visit to China for Prince Adalbert of Prussia, the third son of Kaiser Wilhelm II.

== Appointments in the late-Qing Dynasty ==
In 1905 he was recalled to China and appointed the director of the Nobles' College (貴冑學堂總辦) in Beijing. Since Yinchang had cut his hair, he attached a wig braid to his official hat worn during his frequent summons at court, much to the disapproval of the old bureaucrats. He began his campaign for modernization first by changing the traditional uniforms of the Chinese Army to uniforms modeled on those of the German Army. For equipment, he ordered arms and ammunition from Krupp. Yinchang was a leading advocate for the abolition of the Imperial Examination, which he thought was essential to the modernization of China. Most importantly, this had far-reaching effects; supplanting the Confucian classics opened the curriculum to the modern disciplines of the sciences and humanities. Instead of social advancement solely through civil service appointments, students could pursue their own interests to prepare for any profession, such as the military.

In September 1906 Yinchang became Commander-in-Chief in northern Jiangsu province, and two months later, became Army Chief of Staff. By September 1908 he was reappointed as Chinese Ambassador to Germany, but because of the autumn military maneuvers in Anhui he delayed his departure. Then the sudden death of the Emperor Guangxu on November 14, followed by the death of the Empress Dowager Cixi on the 15th, and the subsequent investiture of Prince Chun as Regent, Yinchang could not proceed to his post until spring 1909. The regent Prince Chun wanted to execute Yuan Shikai for his betrayal of his brother the Emperor Guangxu and the Hundred Days' Reform. Yinchang pleaded on Yuan Shikai's behalf and Prince Chun commuted his sentence which was to be exile from Beijing. On his arrival in Berlin with his wife and entourage, Yinchang, in General's dress, with monocle and sword, was met by the press as a social notable and ladies’ man. In 1910 Yinchang went to China to take up the position of acting President of the Board of War (陸軍部尚書). Reluctant to leave his work in Germany, Yinchang remarked, “I do not think that our country is yet sufficiently far advanced for a man to be able to achieve great results in a short space of time. I do not look upon my appointment either as an enviable one or one in which I am likely to be able to achieve any very striking results.”

== Xinhai Revolution ==
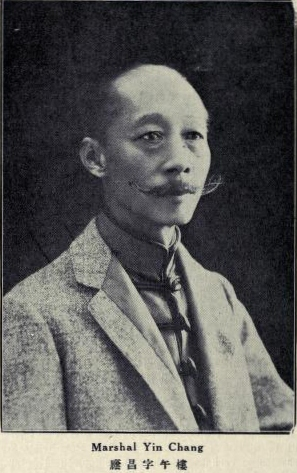
Yinchang (Who's Who in China 3rd ed., 1925)

In September 1910 Yinchang became the Chief of Staff of all the Army divisions stationed in the vicinity of Beijing (訓練近畿陸軍各鎮大臣). Three months later, Yinchang was appointed the first Minister of War in Prince Qing's Cabinet and he consolidated the different branches of the military under his aegis. As Minister of War Yinchang set out to achieve three objectives: greater efficiency and economy in his ministry; improving the military profession; establishing a national chain of command for the military. To instill a sense of professionalism he ordered all officers to wear uniforms at work and to use military salutes on all occasions, official and civil. His actions succeeded in fostering patriotism and pride in the military. As the first Minister of War, Yinchang was dedicated to educating the population of the country with general information about the military and the function and responsibilities of the army. He wanted to create a sense of patriotism by making the military a subject in schools, and the Imperial University added a military course to the curriculum. He required military drills and instruction as well as physical education included in the curriculum of middle and primary schools. Yinchang's efforts at reform encountered opposition from traditionalists, officials protecting their interests and sinecures, and provincial governments guarding their power. The Manchu dynasty fell before the results of his work became evident. Different aspects of it were taken up by succeeding regimes for their own purposes.

In May 1911 Yinchang attained the rank of full general but also remained in the Cabinet. On the outbreak of the Xinhai Revolution in August of that year, General Yinchang was appointed Commander-in-Chief of the Imperial forces and sent to quell the revolutionary army in Hubei. However, as soon as he reached the front, his command of the army of the Qing dynasty was countermanded by Prime Minister Yuan Shikai, so vital weapons and ammunition factories were left unprotected. It extinguished all hopes of a constitutional monarchy. On his return to Beijing he was appointed Chief of the General Staff but resigned from his post as Yuan Shikai established his Cabinet. It has been speculated that had Marshal Yinchang been allowed to remain in Hubei, the revolution might not have been a success. When the monarchy was abolished on Feb. 12, 1912, with the abdication of the Emperor, Yinchang resigned his post in the cabinet marking the Day of the Princes: one Mongol and eight Manchu princes collectively resigned.

== Republic of China ==
With the establishment of the Republic of China, on March 10, 1912, when Yuan Shikai became the interim President in Beijing, the Beiyang government appointed Yinchang as High Diplomatic Advisor in the Ministry of Foreign Affairs. He also took on the responsibility of special envoy between the small court at the palace and the Beiyang Republic. In December 1912 Yinchang was reinstated a full general while also serving as military Chief of Staff to President Yuan Shikai (總統府軍事處處長). Yinchang, following the cautionary example of other officials of the Empire, felt the need to purchase property in German controlled Qingdao in 1913. When the Senate was established for the Republic in May 1914, Yinchang became one of two national representatives of the Manchus. The following January 13, 1915, the first members of the Senate were sworn in at Guanyue Temple by Yinchang who officiated the oath of office ceremony on behalf of President Yuan Shikai. In May 1915, Yuan Shikai abandoned the national anthem promulgated by Sun Yat-Sen, and launched a new national anthem for the Republic of China, “China stands heroically in the universe….”(1915-1921) the lyrics by general Yinchang, music by Wang Lu. In these years, Yuan Shikai bestowed his seventh daughter, the beautiful Zhen Yuanfu, on Yinchang's son, Yin Tiege also known as Yinchang, thus forming an alliance. When despite all of Yinchang's efforts to dissuade him, Yuan Shikai declared himself Emperor in August 1915, he resigned from the government. After Yuan Shikai's death the following June 1916, Yinchang was recalled to his position as military Chief of Staff under President Li Yuanhong.

When on the morning of July 1, 1917, the royalist general Zhang Xun's army entered Beijing and proclaimed the restoration of Puyi as Emperor of China, Yinchang resigned from the Republic and entered the Forbidden City to become Commander of the Imperial Guard. After ten days when this restoration failed, leaving Yinchang with no alternative, he attempted suicide. Officially he remained the chief military advisor, and resuming his duties in October, he was awarded a first class golden medal.

By December 1917, Yinchang was reinstated Chief of the General Staff for the Republic. In January 1919 he was reappointed to military Chief of Staff to the President by Xu Shichang, a position he held for succeeding presidents Li Yuanhong, Feng Guozhang, and Xu Shichang.

In 1922 on the 21st of October, Yinchang, representing the Republic, attended Emperor Puyi's wedding to Princess Wanrong of Gobulo House of the Plain White Banner Clan. In January 1923 the Manchu court had its last great celebration in The Forbidden City. Yinchang was commissioned to publicly convey the official congratulations of the Republic to the Emperor and present him with the special gift of President Li Yuanhong. Yinchang concluded saying, “What just happened was done on behalf of the Republic, now I will pay homage to the Emperor personally,” and carried out the traditional kowtow. His involvement in Republican service did not negate the fact that Yinchang never broke with the old dynasty.

In the last years of his life, he served as Military Adviser to Generalissimo Chiang Kai-shek. In October 1923 he was awarded the title of Marshal with "Zhuang Wei" (莊威將). Some sources say he died in Beijing in 1928, the year that Chiang Kai-shek became head of the Nationalist Government. However, numerous contemporary sources cite the date April 11, 1934, as the date of his death in Peking. He left behind a German widow/concubine and his Manchu son, Yin Tiege.

== Awards and honours ==
- Order of the Double Dragon (China)

== General sources ==
- Seuberlich, Wolfgang. “Yin-Ch’ang Notes on a Manchu General and Diplomat of the Transitional Period" Lydia Brüll & Ulrich Kemper (Eds.) «Asien. Tradition und Fortschrift. Festschrift für Horst Hammitzsch zu seinem 60. Geburtstag», Harrassowitz Verlag, Wiesbaden, 1971, pp. 569 - 583.
- Xu Youchun (徐友春) (main ed.) (2007). Unabridged Biographical Dictionary of the Republic, Revised and Enlarged Version (民国人物大辞典 增订版). Hebei People's Press (Hebei Renmin Chubanshe; 河北人民出版社). ISBN 978-7-202-03014-1.
- Gaimusyô Zyôhôbu [Intelligence Department of Ministry for Foreign Affairs, Japan] (1928). Gendai Sinazin Meikan Kaitei [The Directory of Current Chinese, revised edition]. Tôa Dôbunkai Tyôsa Hensyûbu [Researching and Compilation Department of Toua Doubunkai].
- Who's Who in China 3rd ed. The China Weekly Review (Shanghai), 1925.
- ·Yin Chang, “The Awakening of China”, trans. unknown, The Dresden Daily(English Language Daily), No. 88, Saturday, May 19, 1906.
- Hauptmann Friedrich Heyer von Rosenfeld Archives, Berlin State Library, Prussian Cultural Heritage.

Military offices
| Preceded by Tieliang | Minister of the Army of the Great Qing; 1910–1912 | Succeeded by Wang Shizhen |
