= Prince Wen =

Prince Wen of the Second Rank
- Traditional Chinese: 多羅溫郡王
- Simplified Chinese: 多罗温郡王
Transcriptions
Standard Mandarin
- Hanyu Pinyin: duōluó wēn jùnwáng
- Wade–Giles: to-lo wen chün-wang

Prince Wen of the Second Rank, or simply Prince Wen, was the title of a princely peerage used in China during the Manchu-led Qing dynasty (1644–1912). As the Prince Wen peerage was not awarded "iron-cap" status, this meant that each successive bearer of the title would normally start off with a title downgraded by one rank vis-à-vis that held by his predecessor. However, the title would generally not be downgraded to any lower than a feng'en fuguo gong except under special circumstances.

The first bearer of the title was Mengguan (猛瓘; 1643–1674), Hooge's fifth son and a great-grandson of Nurhaci (the founder of the Qing dynasty). In 1657, Mengguan was granted the title "Prince Wen of the Second Rank" by the Shunzhi Emperor. The title was passed down over three generations and held by five persons.

== Members of the Prince Wen peerage ==
Members of the Prince Wen peerage
- Mengguan (猛瓘; 1643 – 1674; 1st), Hooge's fifth son, held the title Prince Wen of the Second Rank from 1657 to 1674, posthumously honoured as Prince Wen Liang of the Second Rank (溫良郡王)
  - 1 Foyonghui (佛永惠; 1667 – 1678; 2nd), held the title Prince Wen of the Second Rank from 1674 to 1678, posthumously honoured as Prince Wen Ai of the Second Rank (溫哀郡王), had no male heir
  - 2 Yanshou (延綬; 1670 – 1715; 3rd), initially a second-rank prince from 1678 to 1698, demoted to beile from 1698 to 1715
    - 1 Kuihui (揆惠; 1687 – 1734; 4th), held the title of a grace general from 1711 to 1715, promoted to grace bulwark duke from 1715 to 1723, stripped of his title in 1723
    - 2 Kuiliang (揆良), held the title of a feng'en jiangjun from 1716 to 1742
      - 3 Pulu (普祿), Kuiliang's third son, held the title of a grace general from 1742 to 1770
  - 3 Yanxin (延信; 1673 – 1728; 5th), initially a third class supporter general from 1687 to 1721, promoted to lesser bulwark duke in 1721, promoted to beizi in 1723 and then to beile within the same year, his title in stripped 1728
    - 1 Alina (阿里納; 1703 – 1728), Yanxin's eldest son
      - 1 Tiangui (添貴; 1721 – 1765)
        - 1 Zhulong'a (珠隆阿; 1749 – 1795), had not male heir. Xilin adopted as his son.
    - 2 Kuiju (魁舉; 1707 – 1742)
      - Yongquan (永全; 1724 – 1807)
        - Ge'erbing'a (噶爾炳阿; 1760–1809)
          - 2 Xilin (錫麟; born 1807), Ge'erbing'a's second son and Zhulong'a's adopted son
            - 1 Guangyuan (廣元; born 1844),

== Family tree ==
Family of Prince Wen

adoption
Hooge; 1609 – 1648; Prince Su Wu of the First Rank; 1636 – 1648
5
Mengguan ^{1} 猛瓘; 1643 – 1674; Prince Wen Liang of the Second Rank 溫良郡王; 1657 – 1674
1	1	3
Foyonghui ^{2} 佛永惠; 1667 – 1678; Prince Wen Ai of the Second Rank 溫哀郡王; 1674 – 1678	Yanshou ^{3} 延綬; 1670 – 1715; Beile 貝勒; 1698 – 1715	Yanxin ^{5} 延信; 1673 – 1728; Beile 貝勒; 1723 – 1728 (title stripped)
1	1	1	2
Kuihui ^{4} 揆惠; 1687 – 1734; Grace Bulwark Duke 奉恩輔國公; 1715 – 1723 (title stripped)	Kuiliang 揆良; Grace General 奉恩將軍; 1716 – 1742	Alina 阿里納 (1703–1728)	Kuiju 魁舉; 1707 – 1742
3	1
Pulu 普祿; Grace General 奉恩將軍; 1742 – 1770	Tiangui 添貴; 1721 – 1765	Yongquan 永全; 1724 – 1807
1
Zhulong'a 珠隆阿; 1749 – 1795	Ge'erbing'a 噶爾炳阿; 1760 – 1809
2
Xilin 錫麟 b. 1807–
1
Guangyuan 廣元 b. 1844

== See also ==
- Prince Su
- Royal and noble ranks of the Qing dynasty
