= Lu Zhengxiang =

Chinese diplomat and Catholic priest (1871–1949)

- 陸徵祥
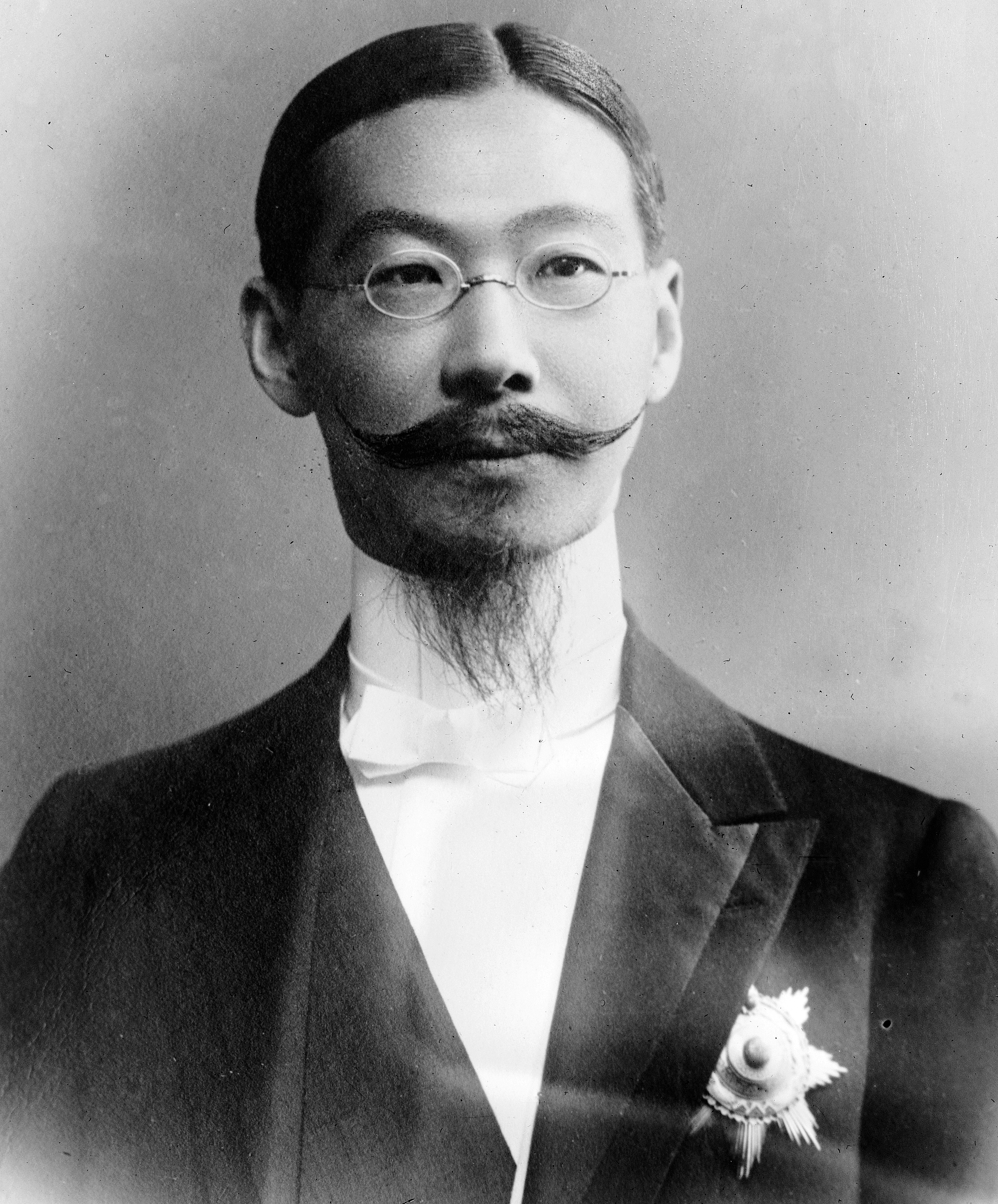

Premier of China
- In office 29 June 1912 – 22 September 1912
- President: Yuan Shikai
- Preceded by: Tang Shaoyi
- Succeeded by: Zhao Bingjun

Prime Minister of the Empire of China
- In office 22 December 1915 – 22 March 1916
- Monarch: Hongxian Emperor
- Preceded by: Xu Shichang (as Premier of the Republic)
- Succeeded by: Xu Shichang (as Premier of the Republic)

Personal details
- Born: 12 June 1871 Shanghai, Jiangsu, Qing dynasty
- Died: 15 January 1949 (aged 77) Bruges, Belgium
- Spouse: Berthe-Françoise-Eugénie Bovy (m. 1899; died 1926)
- Occupation: Diplomat; Benedictine Monk
- Awards: Order of the Double Dragon; Order of Leopold
- Writing career
- Period: 20th century
- Genre: Memoirs, reflections

Chinese name
- Traditional Chinese: 陸徵祥
- Simplified Chinese: 陆征祥
Transcriptions
Standard Mandarin
- Hanyu Pinyin: Lù Zhēngxiāng
- Wade–Giles: Lu^{4} Cheng^{1}-hsiang^{1}
- IPA: [lû ʈʂə́ŋɕjáŋ]
other Mandarin
- Xiao'erjing: لُو ژِنْشْيَانْق

Lu Zhengxiang (Note: Chinese: 陸徵祥; pinyin: Lù Zhēngxiáng; Wade–Giles: Lu^{4} Chêng^{1}-hsiang^{2}; he sometimes used the French name René Lou in earlier life, and Lou Tseng-tsiang in later life) (later Pierre-Célestin, O.S.B.; 12 June 1871 – 15 January 1949) was a Chinese diplomat and a Roman Catholic priest and monk. He was twice Premier of the Republic of China and led his country's delegation at the Paris Peace Conference of 1919.

== Biography ==
Lu was born on 12 June 1871 in Shanghai, Jiangsu, and was raised a Protestant in religion and a Confucianist in philosophy. His father, Lu Yong Fong, was lay catechist for a Protestant mission in Shanghai. He studied at home until the age of thirteen, when he entered the School of Foreign Language in Shanghai, specializing in French. He continued his education at the school for interpreters attached to the Foreign Ministry, and in 1893 he was posted to Saint Petersburg as interpreter (fourth-class) to the Chinese embassy. At that time the diplomatic international language was French, but Lu also gained fluency in Russian. The ambassador, the reform-minded Xu Jingcheng, took an interest in his career. Lu married a Belgian citizen, Berthe Bovy (1855–1926), in St Petersburg on 12 February 1899, and eventually converted to Roman Catholicism. The couple had no children.

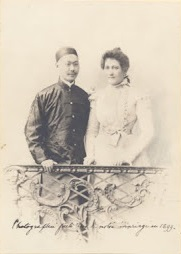
Lu with his wife, Berthe

=== Diplomatic career ===
His early years were marked by the Boxer Rebellion, during which his mentor, Xu Jingcheng, was beheaded in Beijing. Lu served the Qing regime as Chinese delegate at the first and second Peace Conferences in The Hague (1899 and 1907), as Minister to Belgium, and as Ambassador to Russia, but he never forgot the imperial government's betrayal of his "second father". When the 1911 Revolution broke out he was Ambassador in St Petersburg, and he took it upon himself, against the advice of his colleagues at other European capitals, to cable Beijing that there could be no hope of assistance from the Great Powers.

=== Premier and Minister of Foreign Affairs of China ===
At the proclamation of the Chinese Republic in 1912, he joined the party of Sun Yat-Sen, and served as Foreign Minister in the provisional government under President Yuan Shikai, March 1912 – September 1912. In August–September 1912 he also served as Prime Minister, but his lack of political leverage forced his resignation, ostensibly for health reasons. He returned to the cabinet as Foreign Minister from November 1912 to September 1913, and reformed the Foreign Ministry: abolishing the complicated bureaucracy of the imperial commissions, requiring knowledge of foreign languages at all levels, and instituting modern civil service examinations for recruits. He managed to avoid being identified with any particular faction within the new government, but this relative political isolation meant that he was little able to influence policy, and he again resigned. On leaving office he became one of the founders of the Chinese Society of International Law.

From 27 January 1915 to 17 May 1916 he served as Minister of Foreign Affairs for a third time, in the "northern" government in Beijing which enjoyed international recognition, undertaking difficult negotiations with Japan and Russia. He became Foreign Minister for the fourth time on 30 November 1917. He served until 13 August 1920, with deputy minister Chen Lu becoming acting minister during his absence for the peace talks in Paris (November 1918 to December 1919).

=== Paris Peace Conference ===
Lu personally headed the Chinese delegation to the Paris Peace Conference of 1919. Article 156 of the envisioned Versailles Treaty transferred the German treaty territory in Shandong to Japan rather than recognise the sovereign authority of China. On 6 May, with the Japanese delegation insisting that they would only continue to support the conference's aims if Germany's colonial rights in China were transferred to Japan, Lu read the following declaration to the assembled delegates:

The Chinese delegation beg to express their deep disappointment at the settlement proposed by the Council of the Prime Ministers. They also feel certain that this disappointment will be shared in all its intensity by the Chinese nation. The proposed settlement appears to have been made without giving due regard to the consideration of right, justice and the national security of China – consideration which the Chinese delegation emphasized again and again in their hearings before the Council of the Prime Ministers against the proposed settlement, in the hope of having it revised, and if such revision cannot be had, they deem it their duty to make a reservation on the said clauses now.

When it transpired that the Great Powers would not countenance a signature with express reservations against any article, Lu ultimately refused to sign at all. This made China the only participating country not to sign the Versailles Treaty.

=== Benedictine monk and priest in Belgium ===
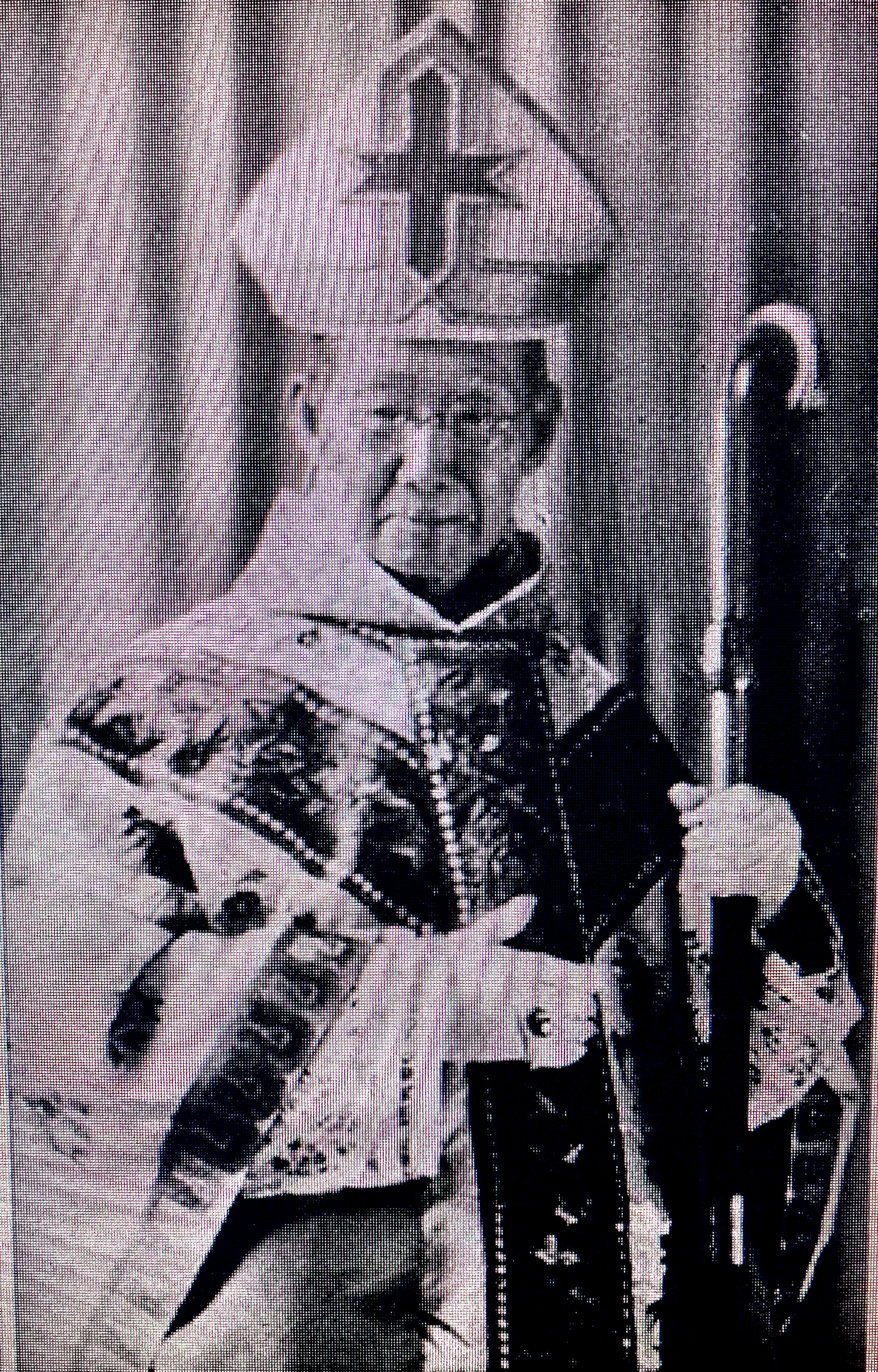
As abbot after 1946

From 1922 to 1927 Lu was China's envoy to the League of Nations in Geneva. At the death of his wife he retired from an active life, and in 1927 became a postulant, under the name Dom Pierre-Célestin, in the Benedictine monastery of Sint-Andries in Bruges, Belgium. He was ordained a priest in 1935. During the Second World War he gave lectures about the Far East in which he propagandized for the Chinese war effort against Japan; German security agents noted the names of those attending but took no further action.

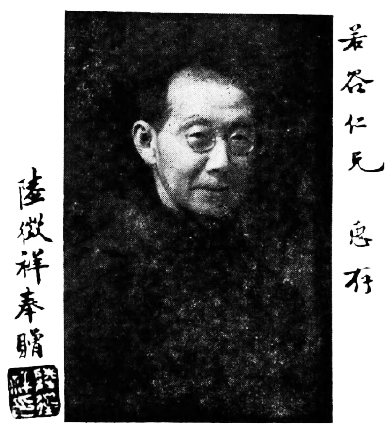

In August 1946 Pope Pius XII appointed Lu titular abbot of the Abbey of St Peter in Ghent. In his final years he hoped to return to China as a missionary, to fulfill the instructions Xu Jingcheng had given him at the beginning of his career:

Europe's strength is found not in her armaments, nor in her knowledge — it is found in her religion [...]. Observe the Christian faith. When you have grasped its heart and its strength, take them and give them to China.

His planned departure was postponed during the Chinese Civil War, and Dom Lu died in Bruges, Belgium on 15 January 1949.

== Publications ==
His best known work, published in 1945, is an autobiography in French, Souvenirs et pensées, summarizing his diplomatic and political career and his subsequent religious vocation, in which Christianity appears as a completion of the Confucian tradition of "pacifying the universe". The work was translated into English by Michael Derrick as Ways of Confucius and of Christ (London, 1948), and into Dutch by Frans Van Oldenburg-Ermke, under the title Mijn roeping: herinneringen en gedachten (Bruges, n.d. [1946]).

His other writings and published addresses include:

- La Vie et les oeuvres du grand chrétien chinois Paul Siu Koang-k’i. Lophem-lez-Bruges: Abbaye de Saint-André, 1934. (A study of Xu Guangqi.)
- Foreword to Marius Zanin, Auguste Haouisée and Paul Yu Pin, La Voix de l’église en Chine: 1931-1932, 1937-1938. Brussels: Éd. de la Cité chrétienne, 1938.
  - Published in English as The Voice of the Church in China, 1931-32, 1937-38. London and New York: Longmans, Green and co., 1938.
- Conférence sur madame Elisabeth Leseur, with a foreword by Marie-L. Herking. n.p., 1943.(On Elisabeth Leseur.)
- Allocution de Dom Lou, abbaye de Saint-André le samedi 10 août 1946 fête de Saint Laurent. n.p., 1946.
- Lettre à mes amis de Grande-Bretagne et d’Amérique. Bruges: Abbaye de Saint-André, 1948.
- La rencontre des humanités et la découverte de l’Evangile. Bruges: Desclée De Brouwer, 1949.

In the 1999 film My 1919 he is portrayed by Xiu Zongdi.

== Additional sources ==
- Strand, David (2011). An Unfinished Republic Leading by Word and Deed in Modern China. Berkeley, CA: University of California Press. ISBN 978-0-52094-874-7.
- Keegan, Nicholas M. (1999). "From Chancery to Cloister: the Chinese Diplomat who became a Benedictine Monk". Diplomacy & Statecraft. 10 (1): 172–185. doi:10.1080/09592299908406114.

Government offices
Preceded by Tang Shaoyi	Premier of China; 1912	Succeeded by Zhao Bingjun
Preceded by Xu Shichang as Premier of the Republic	Prime Minister of the Empire of China (Secretary of State); 1915–1916	Succeeded by Xu Shichang as Premier of the Republic
