= Zhao Bingjun =

Chinese politician (1859–1914)

- 赵秉钧
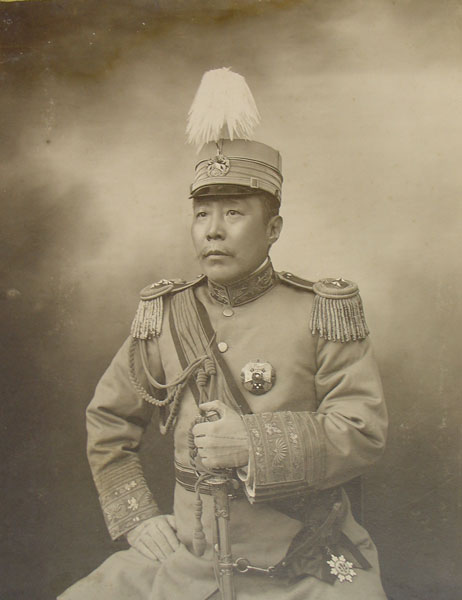
- Zhao c. 1913

Premier of China
- In office 25 September 1912 – 16 July 1913
- President: Yuan Shikai
- Preceded by: Lu Zhengxiang
- Succeeded by: Duan Qirui (acting)

2nd Minister of Internal Affairs of the Imperial Cabinet
- In office 3 October 1911 – 1 November 1911 Serving with Natong
- Monarch: Xuantong Emperor
- Prime Minister: Yikuang, Prince Qing
- Preceded by: Shanqi, Prince Su; Guichun (acting)
- Succeeded by: Position abolished

Personal details
- Born: 3 February 1859
- Died: February 1914 (aged 54–55)
- Awards: Order of Rank and Merit; Order of the Precious Brilliant Golden Grain

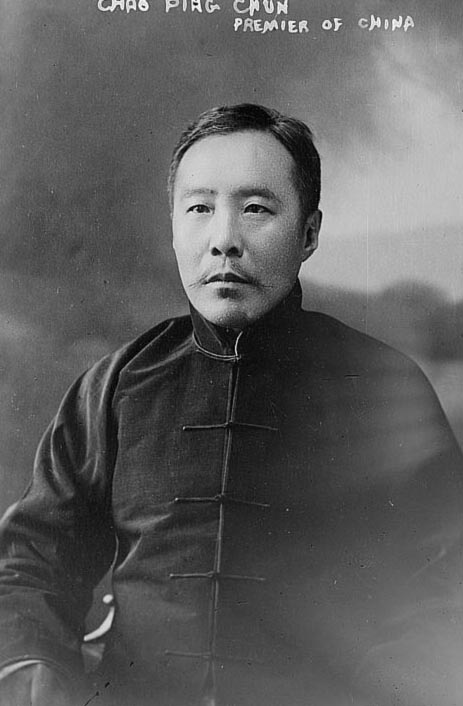
Zhao Bingjun

Zhao Bingjun (Chinese: 赵秉钧; pinyin: Zhào Bǐngjūn) (3 February 1859 – February 1914) was the third premier of China from 25 September 1912 to 1 May 1913. Zhao was previously a public security official during the Qing dynasty and became minister of the interior during the republic before becoming premier. He was directly implicated in the assassination of Song Jiaoren, the man most likely to be his successor. The murder was most likely ordered by the provisional president, Yuan Shikai, who was angry that Song wanted to fill the cabinet with Nationalists that would obstruct Yuan's policies. Zhao protested his and Yuan's innocence but resigned to protect Yuan's government. He was made governor of Zhili. Zhao was mysteriously poisoned in 1914, most likely by Yuan to prevent him from leaking more details of Song's death to the press.

== See also ==
- Premier of the Republic of China

Government offices
| Preceded by Lu Zhengxiang | Premier of China; 1912–1913 | Succeeded by Duan Qirui |
