= Tieliang =

Qing dynasty politician (1863–1938)

- 鐵良
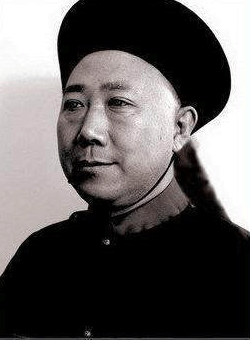
- General Tieliang

General of Jiangning
- In office 7 September 1910 – 3 December 1911
- Preceded by: Qingrui
- Succeeded by: Office abolished (1911 Revolution)

Minister of the Army of the Great Qing
- In office 6 November 1906 – 7 September 1910
- Monarchs: Guangxu Emperor; Xuantong Emperor
- Preceded by: Office established
- Succeeded by: Yinchang

Grand Councilor
- In office 1905–1906

Minister of Revenue
- In office 6 December 1905 – 6 November 1906 Serving with Zhang Baixi
- Monarch: Guangxu Emperor
- Preceded by: Rongqing
- Succeeded by: Puting (as Minister of Finance)

Personal details
- Born: 5 April 1863
- Died: 8 June 1938 (aged 75) British concession of Tianjin
- Party: Royalist Party

Military service
- Allegiance: Great Qing
- Branch/service: Imperial Chinese Army
- Rank: General
- Battles/wars: Xinhai Revolution

Tieliang (Chinese: 鐵良, 5 April 1863 – 8 June 1938), courtesy name Baochen (寶臣), was a member of Bordered White Banner, a general in the late Qing dynasty and one of the main members of the Royalist Party.

== Life ==
He served as the Minister of War from 1906, and he strongly opposed Yuan Shikai. He also opposed regent Zaifeng, calling him "incompetent" and wanted Longyu to serve as regent.

During the Revolution of 1911, when the revolutionaries attacked Nanjing, Tieliang led his subordinate Zhang Xun to defend it. After the fall of Nanjing, Tieliang fled to Shanghai on a Japanese warship and was dismissed by the imperial court. After returning to Beijing, he formed the Royalist Party with Zaixun, Zaitao, Liangbi and others to oppose the abdication of the Qing emperor. After the Republic of China was formed, he moved to the British Concession in Tianjin. He traveled between Qingdao, Dalian, Japan and other places, planning the restoration of the Qing dynasty with Shanqi and others. In 1917, his former subordinate Zhang Xun came to Beijing to mediate the dispute between Duan Qirui and Li Yuanhong. Tieliang took the opportunity to encourage Zhang Xun to lead his Queue Army to restore Puyi. Puyi ascended the throne on July 1, but Zhang was defeated by Duan Qirui only 12 days after the restoration.

In 1931, he participated in planning to take Puyi to Manchukuo.

In 1938, Tieliang died of illness at his residence on Gordon Road in the British Concession in Tianjin.

Military offices
Preceded by Minister of War	Minister of the Army of the Great Qing; 1906–1910	Succeeded by Yinchang
