= Mengguan =

Military personnel of the Qing Dynasty

- Prince Wen of the Second Rank 多羅溫郡王

Head of the House of Prince Wen peerage
- Tenure: 1657–1674
- Predecessor: peerage created
- Successor: Foyonghui
- Born: 21 December 1643
- Died: 12 August 1674 (aged 30)
Posthumous name
- Prince Wenliang of the Second Rank (溫良郡王)
- House: Aisin Gioro
- Father: Hooge
- Mother: Lady Gūwalgiya

Mengguan (猛瓘; 21 December 1643 – 12 August 1674 (Note: In most sources the name is written as Meng'e (猛峨))) was a Qing dynasty imperial prince as the fifth son of Hooge, Prince Su, Hong Taiji's grandson and a cousin of Kangxi Emperor. Mengguan was the first Prince Wen of the Second Rank since 1657. The peerage was not granted perpetual inheritability which meant that his successors would hold diminished ranks. However, the peerage was abolished because Mengguan's son Yanxin was convicted of collaboration with Yunsi.

== Life ==
Mengguan was born to Hooge's secondary princess consort, lady Shuolongwu. Mengguan was raised in the imperial palace since young after he had been noticed by the Empress Xiaoduanwen. The empress had held Mengguan on her arms, sat with him on the chair and ordered Fushou to help her keep watch on Mengguan. When other princes came to attend court session, Prince Li Daišan was startled seeing the empress carefully holding the newborn. Also Dorgon and Jirgalang expressed their puzzlement to Sumalagu entering the Chongzheng hall of the Mukden palace. After that, Mengguan was being taken on various occasions by the empress, including the imperial archery. Nevertheless, Hooge affirmed this kind of upbringing.

It was said that Mengguan shared a close relationship with his half-brother Fushou and paternal uncle Changgadai. Mengguan gained knowledge of the history via relations of Changgadai. Once Changgadai described the death of the Prince Shuncheng of the Second Rank Lekdehun in details referring to the common belief that Lekdehun could raise the stone-carved lion weighing 1000 jin. (Note: jin is the unit of weight equal to 0,5 kilogram) Like Fushou, Mengguan found the late prince Shuncheng as a man of unusual strength.

=== Career ===
Mengguan was granted a title of Prince Wen of the Second Rank (多罗温郡王) in 1657. The proper investiture was held on commemoration of Hooge's merits. However, Fushou inherited the Prince Su of the First Rank peerage as Prince Xian of the First Rank (和硕显亲王) and was later appointed as one of the regents upon the underage Kangxi Emperor. Mengguan was not given any important appointments due to his age. In 1670, when Fushou was murdered by Changgadai, Mengguan could not face up to this fact.

=== Death and succession ===
Mengguan died on 12 August 1674 and was posthumously honoured as Prince Wenliang of the Second Rank (多罗温良郡王; meaning "kind"). Mengguan was succeeded by his eldest son, Foyonghui. After the premature death of Foyonghui, Mengguan's second son Yanshou inherited the title of prince of the third rank. After Yanshou's son Kuihui was stripped of his title, the former third class supporter general Yanxin, Yanshou's brother was granted a title of beile. In 1728, Yanxin was accused of collusion with eighth prince Yunsi who has aimed to seize the throne from the Yongzheng Emperor and Yuntang (Yanxin participated in the military campaigns under the commando of Yuntang). Yanxin was deprived of his title and the title Prince Wen of the Second Rank was proclaimed as expired which meant the abolition of the peerage.

== Family ==
Mengguan was married to lady Khorchin Borjigin, daughter of prince of the second rank Kitad (奇塔特) and prince consort of Dazhe, Princess Jingduan of the First Rank (固伦靖端公主). After the death of his primary consort, Mengguan married lady Guwalgiya, a daughter of third rank literary official Subohe (苏伯赫).

Consorts and issue:

- Primary consort, of the Khorchin Borjigin clan (嫡福晋科尔沁博尔济吉特氏)
- Second primary consort, of the Guwalgiya clan (继福晋瓜尔佳氏)
  - Prince Wen'ai of the Second Rank Foyonghui (多罗温哀郡王; 1667–1678)
  - Prince of the Third Rank Yanshou (多罗贝勒延绶; 1670–1715)
- Secondary consort, of the Fuca clan (侧福晋富察氏)
- Mistress, of the Gao clan (庶福晋高氏)
  - Prince of the Third Rank Yanxin (已革多罗贝勒延信; 1673–1728)
- Mistress, of the Xiyue clan (妾西岳氏)
