= Jin Moyu =

Chinese princess (1918–2014)

- Born: Aisin Gioro Xianqi (愛新覺羅·顯琦); September 14, 1918; Lüshunkou District, Dalian
- Died: May 26, 2014 (aged 95); Beijing, China
- Spouses: Ma Wanli (m. 1954–1958) Shi Youwei (m. 1973–2014)
- Father: Shanqi, Prince Su
- Relatives: Yoshiko Kawashima (sister)

Jin Moyu (Chinese: 金默玉; pinyin: Jīn Mòyù; 14 September 1918 – 26 May 2014), also known as Aisin Gioro Xianqi (Chinese: 愛新覺羅·顯琦; pinyin: Àixīnjuéluó Xiǎnqí), was a Chinese educator and the last surviving Manchu princess. She was the 17th and youngest daughter of Shanqi, the 10th heir to the Prince Su peerage of the Aisin Gioro clan, the imperial clan of the Qing dynasty, which ended with the Xinhai Revolution in 1911.

== Life ==
Jin was born in Lüshun in 1918, seven years after the fall of the Qing dynasty. Both her father and mother died when she was just four years old. She was raised by her three stepsisters after her parents' deaths. She lived in Japan as a student. However, Jin chose to move back to Beijing when she was nineteen years old to pursue a career as either a journalist or entertainer. She settled for a position with a Japanese firm instead.

Jin's elder sibling Yoshiko Kawashima was a Japanese spy who was executed by the Chinese Nationalist Government as a traitor in March 1948. Jin's elder brothers lost most of the Aisin Gioro family fortune in 1948 after the Chinese Civil War. The brothers fled to British Hong Kong, leaving Jin to take care of her six nieces and nephews, as well as Jin's own daughter and the family's elderly nanny. Nearly destitute, Jin sold most of the possessions in her family home. She also earned additional income by selling knitted jumpers and taking out loans.

Jin opened her own restaurant specialising in Sichuan cuisine in 1952. She married Chinese artist Ma Wanli in 1953 (Jin was Ma's third wife). Jin left her restaurant around the time of her wedding and took a position with the country's central translation agency.

In February 1958, Jin was arrested at her home and imprisoned, due solely to her being a descendant of the former imperial family. She remained in prison for 15 years, until her release as a forced farm labourer in 1973. She struggled for several years. In 1978, Jin wrote a letter to Vice Premier Deng Xiaoping pleading for a job. Deng gave her a new job soon after.

During the 1980s, Jin began planning to create a Japanese language school in China. She and her second husband opened a school in Hebei in 1996.

Jin died at a hospital in Beijing on May 26, 2014, at the age of 95.
