= Tang Shaoyi =

Chinese politician; first Premier of the Republic of China (1862–1938)

Tang Shaoyi; 唐紹儀
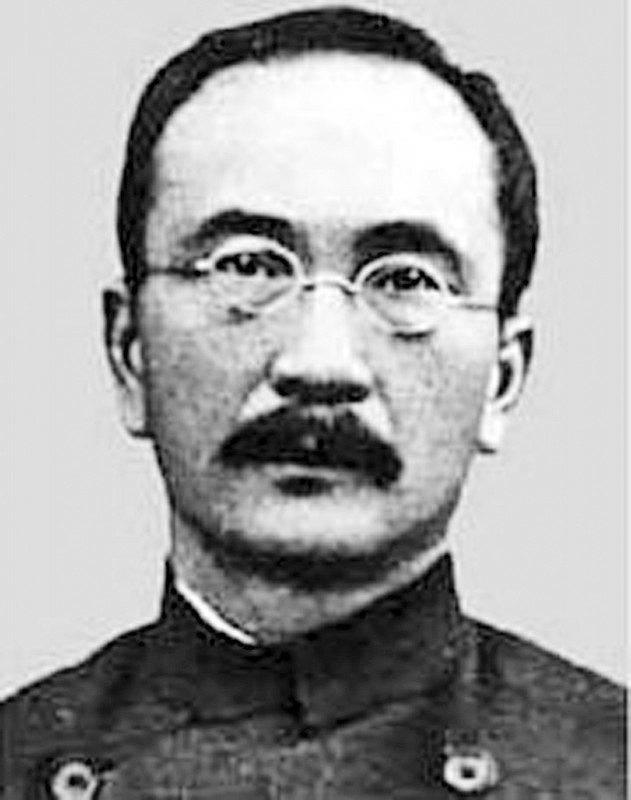

1st Premier of China
- In office 5 August – 19 September 1922
- President: Li Yuanhong
- Preceded by: Yan Huiqing
- Succeeded by: Wang Chonghui
- In office 13 March – 27 June 1912
- President: Yuan Shikai
- Preceded by: Office established
- Succeeded by: Lu Zhengxiang

Minister of Mail and Communications
- In office 26 October – 1 November 1911
- Monarch: Xuantong Emperor
- Prime Minister: Yikuang, Prince Qing (cabinet)
- Preceded by: Sheng Xuanhuai
- Succeeded by: Yang Shiqi (acting)
- In office 17 August 1910 – 6 January 1911 (acting)
- Monarch: Xuantong Emperor
- Preceded by: Xu Shichang
- Succeeded by: Sheng Xuanhuai

Chinese Consul-general in Korea
- In office 1896 – 1897
- Preceded by: Position established
- Succeeded by: Tang Zhaoxian (acting)

Personal details
- Born: 2 January 1862 Xiangshan County, Guangdong, Great Qing
- Died: 30 September 1938 (aged 76) Shanghai, China
- Party: Unity
- Children: 13 daughters, 6 sons
- Education: Columbia University (BA)

Chinese name
- Traditional Chinese: 唐紹儀
- Simplified Chinese: 唐绍仪
Transcriptions
Standard Mandarin
- Hanyu Pinyin: Táng Shàoyí
- Wade–Giles: T'ang^{2} Shao^{4}-i^{2}
Yue: Cantonese
- Yale Romanization: Tòhng Siuh Yìh
- Jyutping: Tong4 Siu6 Ji4

Tang Shaoyi (Chinese: 唐紹儀; 2 January 1862 – 30 September 1938), also spelled Tong Shao Yi, courtesy name Shaochuan (少川), was a Chinese statesman who briefly served as the first Premier of the Republic of China in 1912. In 1938, he was assassinated by the staff of the Bureau of Investigation and Statistics in Shanghai who mistakenly believed that he was preparing to collaborate with the Japanese during the Second Sino-Japanese War.

== Early life ==
Tang was a native of Xiangshan County, Guangdong. Brought to the United States as a student of the Chinese Educational Mission, he attended elementary school in Springfield, Massachusetts and Hartford Public High School in Hartford, Connecticut.

In 1880, he was admitted to Columbia University, but was forced to cut short his studies when the Qing government ended the Mission in 1881 and ordered all students to return to China. Tong was a classmate and close friend of future Columbia president Nicholas Murray Butler.

== Career ==
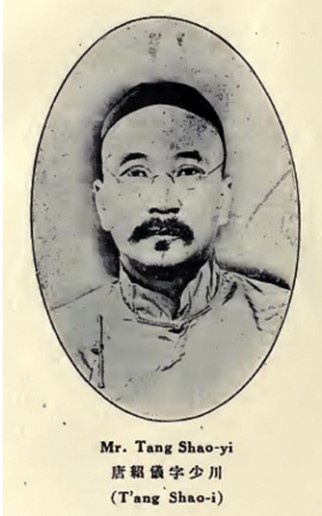
Tang Shaoyi

Tang was a friend of Yuan Shikai; and during the Xinhai Revolution, negotiated on the latter's behalf in Shanghai with the revolutionaries' Wu Ting-fang, ending up with the recognition of Yuan as President of the Republic of China. He had been a diplomat with Yuan Shikai's staff in Korea. In 1900, he was appointed head of the Shandong Bureau of Foreign Affairs under governor Yuan Shikai.

Widely respected, he became the Republic's first Prime Minister in 1912, but quickly grew disillusioned with Yuan's lack of respect for the rule of law and resigned. He later took part in Sun Yat-sen's government in Guangzhou. Tang Shaoyi opposed, on constitutional grounds, Sun's taking of the "Extraordinary Presidency" in 1921; Tang resigned from his position. In 1924, he refused an offer to be foreign minister under warlord Duan Qirui's provisional government in Beijing.

== Assassination ==
In 1937, Tang bought a house on Route Ferguson in the Shanghai French Concession and retired there. The following year, the Japanese invaded and occupied Shanghai (though not yet the foreign concessions). Japanese general Kenji Doihara attempted to recruit Tang to become president of the new pro-Japanese puppet government, and Tang was willing to negotiate with the Japanese. The Kuomintang's intelligence agency Juntong learned about the negotiation, and its chief Dai Li ordered his assassination. On 30 September 1938, Tang was killed in his living room by a Juntong squad who pretended to be antique sellers.

== Family ==
Tang Shaoyi had 19 children, 16 of whom survived into adulthood.

Several of his daughters married prominent Chinese figures. Tang Baoyue (English name May Tang) married the diplomat and judge Koo Kyuin. She died in October 1918 during the Great Influenza Pandemic, after falling ill for only a week.

Another daughter, Lora Tang, was married to the well-known Singapore philanthropist Lee Seng Gee, former chairman of the Lee Foundation.

A daughter from his first wife, Isobel, was married to Henry K. Chang (Chang Chien), the Chinese Ambassador and Consul General at San Francisco (1929).

Government offices
Preceded by Office established	Premier of the Republic of China; 5 August – 19 September 1912	Succeeded by Lu Zhengxiang
