= Hooge, Prince Su =

Manchu Chinese prince (1609–1648)

Hooge
- Prince Su of the First Rank

Head of House of Prince Su peerage
- Tenure: 14 May 1636 – 4 May 1648 (11 years, 356 days)
- Predecessor: peerage created
- Successor: Fushou
- Born: 16 April 1609
- Died: 4 May 1648 (aged 39)
- Consorts: Lady Hada Nara (died 1636) Borjigit Duleima (m. 1636)
- Issue: Qizheng'e; Gutai; Wohena; Fushou, Prince Xianque of the First Rank; Mengguan, Prince Wenliang of the Second Rank; Xingbao; Shushu
Names
- Aisin Gioro Hooge (愛新覺羅 豪格)
Posthumous name
- Prince Suwu of the First Rank (肅武親王)
- House: Aisin Gioro
- Father: Hong Taiji
- Mother: Consort Ji

Hooge
- Chinese: 豪格
Transcriptions
Standard Mandarin
- Hanyu Pinyin: Háogé
- Wade–Giles: Hao-ko

Hooge (Manchu:; 16 April 1609 – 4 May 1648), formally known as Prince Su, was a Manchu prince of the Qing dynasty. He was the eldest son of Hong Taiji, the second ruler of the Later Jin Dynasty and founder of the Qing Dynasty.

== Life ==
Hooge was born in the Aisin Gioro clan as the eldest son of Hong Taiji, the second ruler of the Qing dynasty. His mother was Lady Ula Nara (the aunt of Lady Abahai), one of Hong Taiji's consorts.

Hooge participated in military campaigns against the Mongols, Koreans and the Ming dynasty. After Hong Taiji's death in 1643, Hooge and his uncle Dorgon fought over the succession to the throne. The situation was to Hooge's advantage because the Upper Three Banners (Bordered Yellow, Plain Yellow, Plain Blue) of the Eight Banners previously under Hong Taiji's control had been passed on to him. Hooge at this time was in charge of his father's Plain Blue Banner and also had the support of Plain Yellow Banner commander Sonin and Bordered Yellow Banner Commander Oboi. On the other hand, Dorgon had the support of his two brothers Ajige and Dodo as well as the two White Banners. This meant that the remaining two Red Banners controlled by Daišan and his son, as well as the Bordered Blue Banner under Jirgalang, were crucial to ensuring that Hooge could win the succession. After much dispute, Daišan started favoring Hooge, who ostensibly refused to take the throne. Hooge was actually waiting for others to urge him to take the throne, so that he could sit on it without projecting a power-hungry image on himself. Unfortunately for Hooge, Dorgon and his brothers did not give way, so the conflict continued without a solution. The power struggle concluded with a compromise in order to avoid internal strife. Dorgon nominated Fulin, the 9th son of Hong Taiji born to Consort Zhuang, to be the new ruler, so Fulin ascended to the throne as the Shunzhi Emperor. Another story suggests that Consort Zhuang's Khorchin Mongol Borjigit clan would only support an heir with Mongolian blood and most specifically from the Khorchin Borjigit clan. Although Consort Zhuang is rumored to have a romantic relationship with Dorgon, she had a discussion with Sonin, Oboi, Fan Wencheng, and Jirgalang in order to prevent the Qing Empire from splitting in half due to succession disputes. Dorgon agreed to Consort Zhuang's 9th son Fulin on the basis that he is a son of Hong Taiji out of respect for his 8th brother for raising him and Dorgon to be the senior regent while Jirgalang becomes the assistant regent. Hooge and the Three Upper Banners also support the decision based on Fulin being Hong Taiji's son and not Dorgon taking the throne.

Even after the Shunzhi Emperor came to power, there was still much friction between Hooge and Dorgon. According to popular belief, Hooge had conceived a scheme to seize the throne from the Shunzhi Emperor, but he leaked out his plan to his uncle Dodo, who informed Dorgon about it. Dorgon then used this as an excuse to have Hooge arrested and thrown into prison. There are also rumors that Ajige and Dodo urged Dorgon to seize the throne for himself and that originally Nurhaci had wanted Dorgon as his successor. However historical records state that Hooge was imprisoned after the Qing government launched military campaigns against remnant rebel forces in western China, and he died during his incarceration. He was posthumously rehabilitated in 1650, two years after his death.

== Family ==
Primary Consort

- First primary consort, of the Hada Nara clan (嫡福晉 哈達那拉氏; d. 1636)
- Second primary consort, of the Khorchin Borjigit clan (繼福晉 博爾濟吉特氏), personal name Duleima (杜勒瑪)
  - Fushou, Prince Xianque of the First Rank (顯愨親王 富綬; 2 July 1643 – 11 January 1670), fourth son

Secondary Consort

- Secondary consort, of the Nara clan (側福晉 那拉氏)
  - Third daughter (8 June 1638 – February/March 1646)
- Secondary consort, of the Shuolongwu clan (側福晉 碩隆武氏)
  - Lady of the First Rank (郡君; 29 September 1636 – November/December 1680), second daughter
  - Princess of the Third Rank (郡主; 8 September 1638 – July/August 1652), fifth daughter
  - Mengguan, Prince Wenliang of the Second Rank (溫良郡王 猛瓘; 21 December 1643 – 12 August 1674), fifth son

Concubine

- Mistress, of the Gūwalgiya clan (瓜爾佳氏)
  - First daughter (14 September 1631 – April/May 1692)
- Mistress, of the Nara clan (那拉氏)
  - Qizheng'e (齊正額; 16 November 1634 – March/April 1677), first son
- Mistress, of the Huang clan (黃氏; d. 1648)
  - Gutai, General of the Second Rank (輔國將軍 固泰; 13 March 1638 – 18 August 1701), second son
  - Wohena, General of the Second Rank (輔國將軍 握赫納; 7 March 1639 – 24 October 1662), third son
  - Lady of the First Rank (郡君; 22 August 1641 – June/July 1703), seventh daughter
    - Married Geng Jingzhong (1644–1682) in October/November 1659
- Mistress, of the Wang clan (王氏)
  - Fourth daughter (2 September 1638 – August/September 1667)
- Mistress, of the Niu clan (牛氏)
  - Sixth daughter (19 November 1638 – November/December 1693)
  - Tenth daughter (24 June 1646 – June/July 1677)
- Mistress, of the Sirin Gioro clan (西林覺羅氏)
  - Eighth daughter (3 November 1641 – March/April 1703)
  - Ninth daughter (25 October 1644 – January/February 1661)
- Mistress, of the Ningguta clan (寧古塔氏)
  - Xingbao (星保; 26 December 1643 – 16 May 1686), sixth son
- Mistress, of the Irgen Gioro clan (伊爾根覺羅氏)
  - Shushu (舒書; 22 February 1645 – 2 November 1685), seventh son
- Mistress, of the Sirin Gioro clan (西林覺羅氏)
  - 11th daughter (22 October 1646 – December 1692 or January 1693)

== See also ==
- Prince Su
- Prince Wen
- Royal and noble ranks of the Qing dynasty
- Ranks of imperial consorts in China#Qing
