= Xu Shichang =

President of the Republic of China (1855–1939)

- 徐世昌
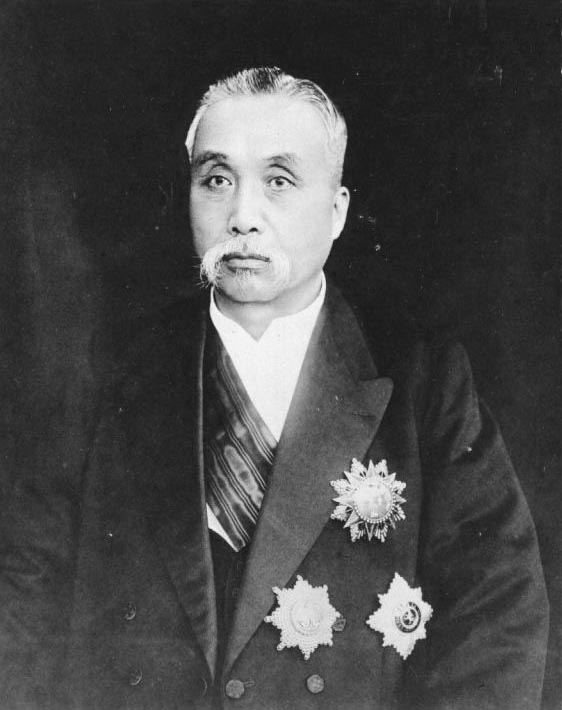

President of China
- In office 10 October 1918 – 2 June 1922
- Premier: Qian Nengxun; Gong Xinzhan (acting); Jin Yunpeng; Yan Huiqing (acting); Sa Zhenbing (acting); Liang Shiyi; Zhou Ziqi (acting)
- Preceded by: Feng Guozhang
- Succeeded by: Zhou Ziqi

Premier of China
- In office 22 March – 23 April 1916
- President: Yuan Shikai
- Preceded by: Lu Zhengxiang (as Prime Minister of the Empire of China)
- Succeeded by: Duan Qirui
- In office 1 May 1914 – 22 December 1915
- President: Yuan Shikai
- Preceded by: Sun Baoqi (acting)
- Succeeded by: Lu Zhengxiang (as Prime Minister of the Empire of China)
Imperial offices
1st Minister of the Cabinet of the Imperial Cabinet
In office 8 May – 1 November 1911 Serving with Natong
| Monarch | Xuantong Emperor |
| Prime Minister | Yikuang, Prince Qing |
| Preceded by | Position established |
| Succeeded by | Position abolished |
Grand Councilor
In office 1905–1906
Grand Secretary of the Tiren Library
In office 17 August 1910 – 5 August 1911
Assistant Grand Secretary
In office January – 5 August 1911
5th Minister of Mail and Communications
In office 9 February 1909 – 17 August 1910
| Monarch | Xuantong Emperor |
| Preceded by | Chen Bi |
| Succeeded by | Tang Shaoyi |
1st Viceroy of the Three Eastern Provinces
In office 12 June 1907 – 8 February 1909
| Monarch | Xuantong Emperor |
| Preceded by | Position established |
| Succeeded by | Xiliang |

Personal details
- Born: 20 October 1855 Weihui, Henan, Qing China
- Died: 5 June 1939 (aged 83) British concession of Tianjin, Tianjin, China
- Party: Anfu Club
- Other political affiliations: Anhui clique
- Education: jinshi degree in Imperial examination (1886)
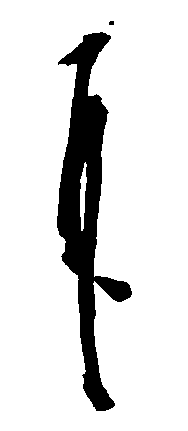
- Signature

Xu Shichang (Chinese: 徐世昌; pinyin: Xú Shìchāng; Wade–Giles: Hsü^{2}Shih^{4}-ch'ang^{1}; courtesy name Juren (Chinese: 菊人; pinyin: Júrén; Wade–Giles: Chu-jen); 20 October 1855 – 5 June 1939) was a Chinese politician who served as the President of China from 10 October 1918 to 2 June 1922. A member of the Anhui clique, he was the only permanent president of the Beiyang government to be a civilian; his presidency was also the longest of the Warlord Era. Previously, he was Minister of the Cabinet of the Imperial Cabinet during the Qing dynasty.

== Biography ==
Xu Shichang's ancestral hometown was Yinxian County (current Yinzhou District), Ningbo, Zhejiang. Born in Weihui, Henan, he was Yuan Shikai's closest friend. He was at one time the Viceroy of the Three Northeast Provinces, served as minister of the cabinet in Prince Qing's Cabinet, and tutored the final Qing Emperor, Puyi. At the end of the Qing dynasty, Xu was made chief of the general staff despite being a civilian. Following the overthrow of the monarchy and the establishment of the Republic of China, he was appointed minister of state by Yuan Shikai in 1912, as the latter hoped that this would appease the pro-Qing Royalist Party. Xu resigned as secretary of state (premier) in protest of Yuan's self-proclaimed monarchy in late 1915. He resumed his post after Yuan abandoned monarchism on 22 March 1916.

His election as president was largely engineered by Duan Qirui and his Anhui clique. He was chosen because he was a civilian yet had close ties to the Beiyang Army and was neutral to both its Zhili and Anhui cliques. Lacking any military power of his own, he had to play Duan, Zhili leader Cao Kun, and Fengtian leader Zhang Zuolin against each other to stay in power.

Xu believed the monarchy would eventually be restored, and to prepare Puyi for the challenges of the modern world had hired Reginald Johnston to teach Puyi "subjects such as political science, constitutional history and English".

He held a massive celebration in Beijing for China's victory in World War I on 18 November 1918. However, he then brought troops into the Allied intervention in the Russian Civil War. A ceasefire with Sun Yat-sen's rival Constitutional Protection Junta based in Guangzhou was declared and intellectuals were given greater freedom. This lasted until news from France revealed that Duan Qirui had promised former German territory in Shandong to Japan. Large student protests in the May Fourth Movement led to Xu cracking down with mass arrests. Ma Jun (馬駿), a Muslim, led protests against the Versailles Treaty. The delegation was ordered home and China refused to sign or ratify the Treaty of Versailles. Consequently, the shaky alliance between the Zhili and Anhui cliques collapsed with Duan decisively defeated. This led to the era of high warlordism. Conflict with the anti-Beiyang movements in Southern China flared again in 1920, and he also failed to retake Outer Mongolia. Cao Kun, who never liked Xu, pressured him out of office and restored Li Yuanhong.

Xu retired from politics and moved to the British concession in Tianjin, where he died on 5 June 1939 at the age of 83.

Xu was a member of a spirit writing organization.

Government offices
| Preceded by Sun Baoqi | Premier of China (Secretary of State); 1914–1915 | Succeeded by Lu Zhengxiang |
| Preceded by Lu Zhengxiang | Premier of China (Secretary of State); 1916 | Succeeded by Duan Qirui |
| Preceded by Feng Guozhang | President of China; 1918–1922 | Succeeded by Zhou Ziqi |
