= Shanqi =

Chinese Qing dynasty prince and minister (1866–1922)

Shanqi 善耆
- Prince Su of the First Rank
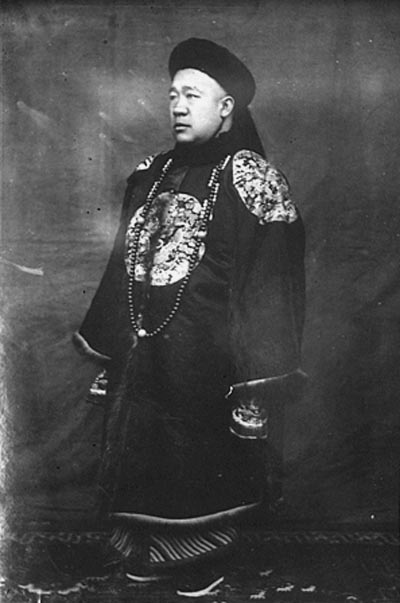

Prince Su of the First Rank
- Tenure: 1898–1922
- Predecessor: Longqin
- Successor: Xianzhang

Minister of the National Minority Affairs
- Tenure: 15 August–1 November 1911
- Predecessor: Shouqi
- Successor: Dashou
- Monarch: Xuantong Emperor

Minister of Internal Affairs
- Tenure: 5 May–15 August 1911
- Predecessor: position created
- Successor: Guichun (acting)
- Monarch: Xuantong Emperor
- Born: Shanqi; 5 October 1866; Shuntian Prefecture, Beijing, Qing Empire
- Died: 29 March 1922 (aged 55); Lüshunkou District, Kwantung Leased Territory
- Burial: Prince Su Cemetery, Beijing, Republic of China
- Spouses: Lady Hešeri; Lady Cenggiya; Lady Tunggiya; Lady Janggiya; Lady Zhanggiya
- Issue: Xianzhang; Jin Bidong; Yoshiko Kawashima; Jin Moyu
- House: Aisin-Gioro
- Dynasty: Qing
- Father: Longqin
- Mother: Lady Ligiya

Shanqi (Chinese: 善耆; 5 October 1866 – 29 March 1922), courtesy name Aitang (艾堂), formally Prince Su of the First Rank, was a prince of the Aisin-Gioro clan, the ruling clan of the Qing dynasty, as well as a minister in the late Qing. He was from the Bordered White Banner.

== History ==
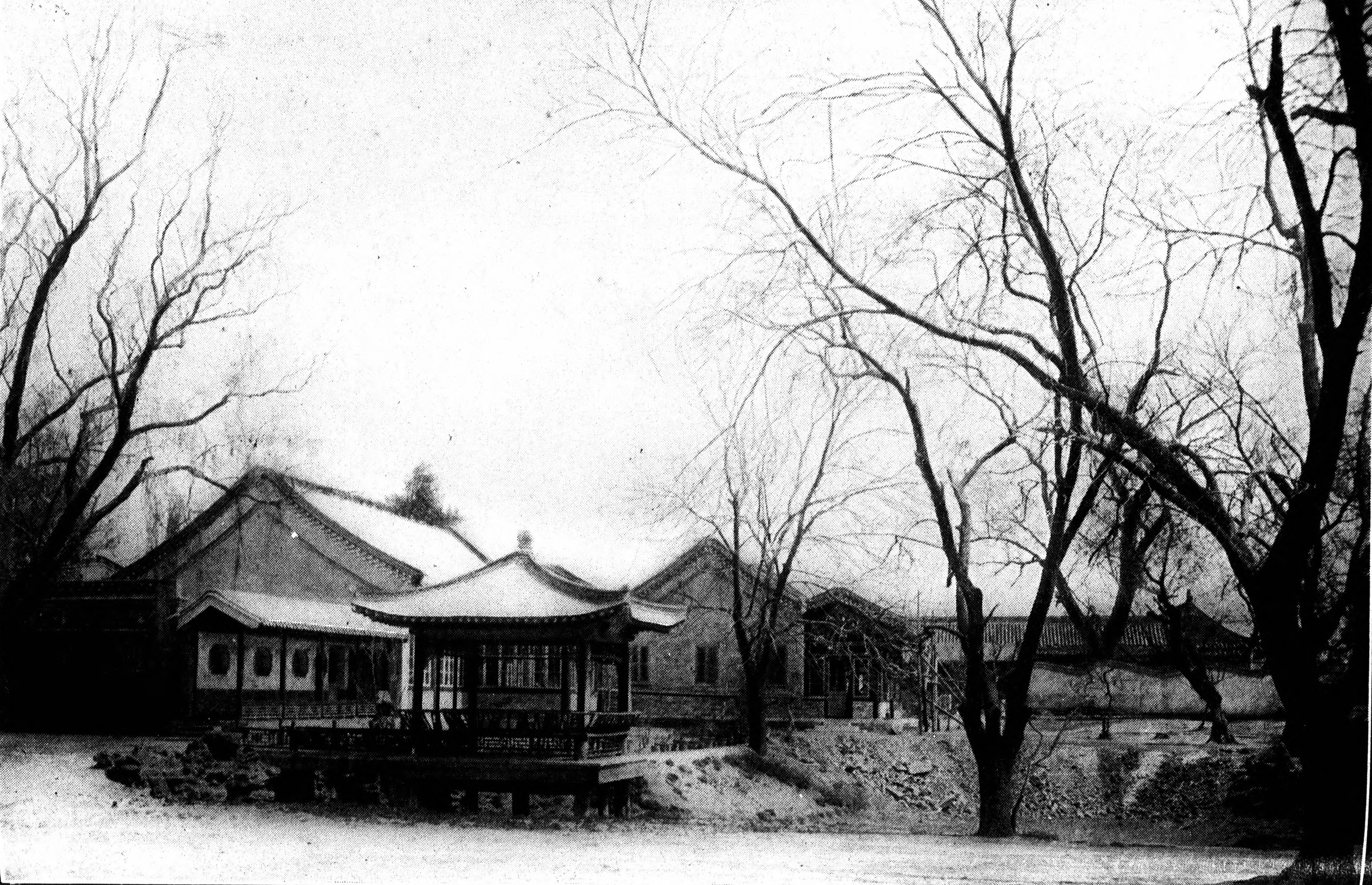
Residence of Prince Su (Suwang Fu)

Shanqi was born on 5 October 1866 (27 August on the Chinese Lunar Calendar) in Beijing. He was the tenth-generation Prince Su and a descendant of Hooge. Hooge was the eldest son of Hong Taiji, and was supported by the Yellow Banners in his bid to become emperor after his death. However, after a decision by an assembly of Manchu nobles and authorities, Fulin, the ninth brother, was chosen as emperor (becoming the Shunzhi Emperor). Hooge kept his position of Prince Su.

Shanqi served as the tax supervisor of Chongwenmen, as a commander in the Army, as a member of the Ministry of Civil Affairs, and as an early leader within the Beijing gendarmerie and Qing police system. During the late Qing dynasty, there was a movement for a constitution. With the later years of the Guangxu Emperor, Shanqi was known to be sympathetic to revolutionaries.

During the Boxer Rebellion, Shanqi's walled palace, the Su Wang Fu, which was southeast of the Forbidden City and in the diplomatic quarter, was part of the defenses during the 1900 siege of the International Legations and was used as a shelter by thousands of Chinese Christian converts.

During the early days of the Xuantong Emperor (Puyi), when plans to assassinate the regent, Zaifeng, by Wang Zhaoming were revealed, Shanqi was questioned by Zaifeng.

In 1908, Shanqi joined a group supervising the Admiralty (haijun yamen). He was an acquaintance of the Manchu Jinliang. He served terms at the Ministry of the Interior, when he developed the gendarmerie, and the Ministry of Dependencies. These terms overlapped. He held the position of Bujun tongling (Head of the Gendarmerie). In early 1909, Shanqi, as the head of civilian affairs, drew up a plan to cut down administrative spending and focus more on police personnel as a way to reduce police spending as a whole. This led to the removal and replacement of the positions of Guichang and Qiyuan within the police force.

After the Xinhai Revolution, Shanqi formed the backbone of the Royalist Party, proclaiming his "official duty to the lord" (junchen dayi). Shanqi refused to accept the abdication of Xuantong and was smuggled to the Japanese concession of Port Arthur in the Kwantung Leased Territory. In 1912, Shanqi gained Japanese support to create an independent Manchu state under Puyi along with his 14th daughter, Jin Bihui, whom he had allowed to be adopted by Kawashima Naniwa (Jin Bihui changed her name to Yoshiko Kawashima to reflect this). However, this plan failed when the Japanese withdrew their support in favor of working with Yuan Shikai.

Before and after the Manchu Restoration by Zhang Xun in 1917, two Manchu-Mongol independence movements were launched, both of which ended in failure. Shanqi was involved in the first one. The 1916 Manchu-Mongol Independence Movement, supported by businessman Okura Kihachiro, involved a one million yen investment to the Royalist Party, who held an army in Manchuria, composed of restorationists and Mongolian bandits. These funds were used to buy and transport arms. General Tanaka Giichi was to assist him in capturing Mukden and setting up a Manchurian state North of the Great Wall, eventually striking Beijing. This uprising was to be started on 15 April 1916, and timed to be at the same time as the National Protection War. However, as Tanaka was unable to receive arms in time, he suspended the operations on 4 April. After Yuan Shikai's death, the Japanese decided that if the new President of China, Li Yuanhong, was responsive to the Japanese, Japan would give their support to the Chinese government. The Japanese Foreign Ministry, who wanted to dismantle the Manchu-Mongol Independence Movement, reached an agreement with Kawashima Naniwa. Shanqi's men were to be disbanded in 16 days from the agreement. The loans given to him were to be continued, but the 215,000 yen used by Kawashima would be deducted. On 7 September, the movement was officially disbanded.

In 1922, Shanqi died in Lüshun. His body was transported to the Prince Su Cemetery in Beijing. During his lifetime, Shanqi never reconciled with the Republic of China. Due to his loyalty (zhong) to Puyi, he was posthumously named Prince Su Zhong (肅忠親王, Su Zhong Qinwang).

== Family ==
Shanqi was married to Lady Hešeri (the Princess Consort), and had four other concubines. He had 21 sons, the most notable being his eldest son, Xianzhang, and 7th son, Jin Bidong. He also had 17 daughters, the most notable being his 14th daughter, Jin Bihui, and his 17th daughter, Jin Moyu.

Father: Longqin, Prince Sulian of the First Rank (肃良亲王 隆勤)

- Paternal grandfather: Huafeng, Prince Suke of the First Rank (肃恪亲王 华丰)
- Paternal grandmother: Lady Wugiya (吴佳氏), daughter of Delin (得林)

Mother: Lady Ligiya (李佳氏), secondary consort

- Maternal grandfather: Changlin (常林)

Consorts and issue:

- Primary consort, of the Hešeri clan
  - Xianzhang (先章; 1885–1947), first son
    - Issue: One daughter, Lianlu who married Yong'en in 1940 and had issue (4 sons, 3 daughters)
  - Xiande (先德), second son
  - Xianzhen (先真), eighth son
  - Xianxuan (显瑄), first daughter
  - Xian'er (显珥), second daughter
  - Xianshan (显珊), third daughter adopted by lady Cenggiya
- Secondary consort, of the Cenggiya clan (程佳氏)
  - Xianping (先平), third son
  - Xianchang (先常), fourth son
  - Xianyi (先宜), fifth son
  - Jin Bidong, seventh son
  - Fourth daughter
  - Fifth daughter
  - Sixth daughter
- Secondary consort, of the Tunggiya clan
  - Xianying, sixth son
  - Xiangui, ninth son
  - Xianyuan, eleventh son
  - Xianjun, twelfth son
  - Xian'e (显珴), twelfth daughter
  - Xianshi (显瑡), tenth daughter
  - Xianxun (显珣), fifteenth daughter
- Secondary consort, of the Janggiya clan (姜佳氏)
  - Xianyun (先允), thirteenth son
  - Xianjiu (先久), fifteenth son
  - Xianqi (显琪), seventh daughter
  - Xianjiu (显玖), ninth daughter
  - Xiancong (显琮), thirteenth daughter
- Secondary consort, of the Zhanggiya clan (张佳氏)
  - Xianli (先立), fourteenth son
  - Xianfang (先方), sixteenth son
  - Xianji (先基), seventeenth son
  - Xiankai (先开), eighteenth son
  - Xianrong (先容), nineteenth son
  - Twentieth son
  - Xiandong (先东), twenty-first son
  - Yoshiko Kawashima, fourteenth daughter
  - Xianliu (显瑠), sixteenth daughter
  - Jin Moyu, seventeenth daughter
- Mistress, of the Ligiya clan (李佳氏)
  - Eighth daughter
- Mistress, of the Zhanggiya clan (张佳氏)
  - Eleventh daughter
