= Prince Su =

Title during the Qing Dynasty

Prince Su of the First Rank
- Traditional Chinese: 和碩肅親王
- Simplified Chinese: 和硕肃亲王
Transcriptions
Standard Mandarin
- Hanyu Pinyin: héshuò sù qīnwáng
- Wade–Giles: ho-shuo su ch'in-wang

Prince Xian of the First Rank
- Traditional Chinese: 和碩顯親王
- Simplified Chinese: 和硕显亲王
Transcriptions
Standard Mandarin
- Hanyu Pinyin: héshuò xiǎn qīnwáng
- Wade–Giles: ho-shuo hsien ch'in-wang

Prince Su of the First Rank (Manchu: ᡥᠣᡧᠣᡳ
ᡶᠠᡶᡠᠩᡤᠠ
ᠴᡳᠨ ᠸᠠᠩ; hošoi fafungga cin wang; Chinese: 和碩肅親王; pinyin: héshuò sù qīnwáng), or simply Prince Su (Chinese: 肅親王), was the title of a princely peerage of the Manchu-led Qing dynasty of China (1644–1912). It was also one of the 12 "iron-cap" princely peerages in the Qing dynasty, which meant that the title could be passed down without being downgraded.

The first bearer of the title was Hooge (1609–1648), the eldest son of Hong Taiji, the founding emperor of the Qing dynasty. He was awarded the title in 1636 by his father. The peerage was renamed to Prince Xian of the First Rank (Prince Xian) when it was passed on to Hooge's son, Fushou (died 1669), in 1651. It was also given "iron-cap" status later on. In 1778, when Yunzhu (died 1778) was holding the title, the Qianlong Emperor renamed it back to "Prince Su of the First Rank". The peerage was passed down over ten generations and held by 11 persons – eight as Prince Su, and three as Prince Xian.

== Members of the Prince Su / Prince Xian peerage ==
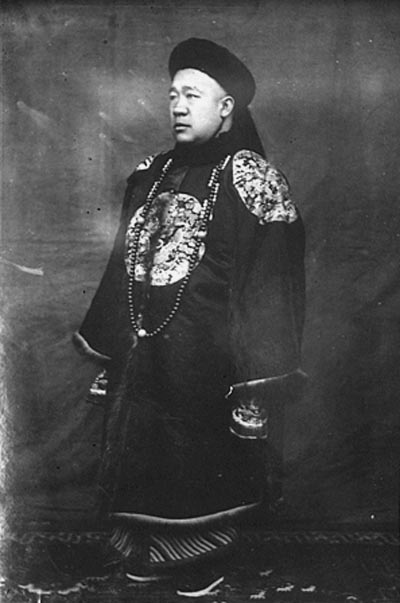
Shanqi (1866–1922), the tenth Prince Su

Members of the Prince Su / Prince Xian peerage
- Hooge (1609–1648; 1st), Hong Taiji's eldest son, held the title Prince Su of the First Rank from 1636 to 1648, posthumously honoured as Prince Suwu of the First Rank (肅武親王)
  - 4 Fushou (富綬; 1643–1670; 2nd), held the title Prince Xian of the First Rank from 1651 to 1669, posthumously honoured as Prince Xianque of the First Rank (顯愨親王)
    - 4 Danzhen (丹臻; died 1702; 3rd), held the title Prince Xian of the First Rank from 1670 to 1702, posthumously honoured as Prince Xianmi of the First Rank (顯密親王)
      - 2 Chengxin (成信; died 1758), posthumously honoured as Prince Su of the First Rank. He used to be a supporter general.
        - 5 Yongxi (永錫; died 1821; 6th), held the title Prince Su of the First Rank from 1778 to 1821, posthumously honoured as Prince Sugong of the First Rank (肅恭親王)
          - 1 Jingmin (敬敏; died 1852; 7th), held the title Prince Su of the First Rank from 1821 to 1852, posthumously honoured as Prince Sushen of the First Rank (肅慎親王)
            - 3 Huafeng (華豐; died 1869; 8th), held the title Prince Su of the First Rank from 1853 to 1869, posthumously honoured as Prince Suke of the First Rank (肅恪親王)
              - 3 Longqin (隆懃; 1840–1898; 9th), held the title Prince Su of the First Rank from 1870 to 1898, posthumously honoured as Prince Suliang of the First Rank (肅良親王)
                - 1 Shanqi (善耆; 1866–1922; 10th), held the title Prince Su of the First Rank from 1898 to 1922, posthumously honoured as Prince Suzhong of the First Rank (肅忠親王)
                  - 1 Xianzhang (憲章; 1885–1947; 11th), held the title Prince Su of the First Rank from 1922 to 1945
      - 6 Yanhuang (衍潢; died 1771; 4th), held the title Prince Xian of the First Rank from 1702 to 1771, posthumously honoured as Prince Xianjin of the First Rank (顯謹親王)
    - 5 Baichali (拜察禮; died 1708), posthumously honoured as Prince Xian of the First Rank. He used to be a bulwark general.
      - 3 Yunzhu (蘊著; died 1778; 5th), initially succeeded his father as a 3rd class supporter general. He held the title Prince Xian of the First Rank from 1772 to 1778, had his title renamed to Prince Su of the First Rank in 1778, posthumously honoured as Prince Suqin of the First Rank (肅勤親王)

== Lesser members ==
Lesser members
- Hooge, Prince Suwu
  - 1 Qizheng'e (齊正額; 1634–1677)
  - 2 Gutai (固泰; 1638–1701), a bulwark general (title stripped)
  - 3 Wohena (握赫納; 1639–1662), a bulwark general
  - 4 Fushou, Prince Xianque
    - 4 Danzhen, Prince Xianmi
      - 2 Chengxin, supporter general (posthumously Prince Su)
        - 5 Yongxi, Prince Sugong
          - 1 Jingmin, Prince Sushen
            - 3 Huafeng, Prince Suke
              - 3 Longqin, Prince Suliang
                - 1 Shanqi, Prince Suzhong
                  - 1 Xianzhang, 11th prince
                  - 2 Xiande (憲德)
                  - 3 Xianping (憲平)
                  - 4 Xianchang (憲常), died prematurely
                  - 5 Xianyi (憲宜)
                  - 6 Xianying (憲英)
                  - 7 Jin Bidong (金壁東; 1896–1941), born Xiankui (憲奎)
                  - 8 Xianzhen (憲真)
                  - 9 Xiangui (憲貴)
                  - 10 Xianbang (憲邦)
                  - 11 Xianyuan (憲原)
                  - 12 Xianjun (憲均)
                  - 13 Xianyun (憲雲)
                  - 14 Xianli (憲立)
                  - 15 Xianjiu (憲久)
                  - 16 Xianfang (憲方)
                    - Lianjing (連經)
                  - 17 Xianji (憲基)
                  - 18 Xiankai (憲開)
                  - 19 Xianrong (憲容)
                  - 21 Xiandong (憲東)
  - 5 Mengguan, Prince Wenliang of the Second Rank (see Prince Wen)
  - 6 Xingbao (星保; 1643–1686), a top class imperial guard
  - 7 Shushu (舒書; 1645–1685)

== Family tree ==
Family of Prince Su

Hong Taiji
1
Hooge 豪格 (1609–1648); Prince Suwu 肅武親王 (1636–1648)
4
Fushou 富綬 (died 1669); Prince Xianque 顯慤親王 (1651–1669)
4	5
Danzhen 丹臻 (died 1702); Prince Xianmi 顯密親王 (1670–1702)	Baichali 拜察禮 (died 1708); Prince Xian 顯親王 (posthumously awarded)
2	6	3
Chengxin 成信 (died 1758); Prince Su 肅親王 (posthumously awarded)	Yanhuang 衍潢 (died 1771); Prince Xianjin 顯謹親王 (1702–1771)	Yunzhu 蘊著 (died 1778); Prince Suqin 肅勤親王 (1772–1778)
5
Yongxi 永錫 (died 1821); Prince Sugong 肅恭親王 (1778–1821)
1
Jingmin 敬敏 (died 1852); Prince Sushen 肅慎親王 (1821–1852)
3
Huafeng 華豐 (died 1869); Prince Suke 肅恪親王 (1853–1869)
3
Longqin 隆懃 (1840–1898); Prince Suliang 肅良親王 (1870–1898)
1
Shanqi 善耆 (1866–1922); Prince Suzhong 肅忠親王 (1898–1922)
1
Xianzhang 憲章 (1885–1947); Prince Su 肅親王 (1922–1945)

== See also ==
- Prince Wen, the peerage of Mengguan, Hooge's fifth son
- Yoshiko Kawashima, Shanqi's child
- Jin Moyu, Shanqi's daughter
- Royal and noble ranks of the Qing dynasty
