= List of premiers of the Republic of China =

This is a list of the premiers of the Republic of China since 1912. The Republic of China before 1949 controlled mainland China as well as offshore islands. The Republic of China since 1949 has only controlled Taiwan and nearby islands. The current Republic of China is usually known as Taiwan. In the country's history, the official title of the head of government has changed over time.

Year	Chinese	Mandarin Pinyin	Taiwanese Pe̍h-ōe-jī	Hakka Pha̍k-fa-sṳ
1912–1914, 1916–1928	國務總理	Guówù Zǒnglǐ	Kok-bū Chóng-lí	Koet-vu Chúng-lî
1914–1916	政事堂國務卿	Zhèngshìtáng Guówùqīng	Chèng-sū-tông Kok-bū-khing	Chṳn-sṳ-thòng Koet-vu-khîn
1928–present	行政院院長	Xíngzhèng Yuàn Yuànzhǎng	Hêng-chèng Īⁿ Īⁿ-tiúⁿ	Hàng-chṳn Yen Yen-tshòng

Premiers, also known as Presidents of the Executive Yuan, are appointed by the Presidents of the Republic of China, but some premiers were even more powerful than the presidents, during the early age of the Republic of China. Some presidents were even expelled by the premiers they appointed. The title of premier in China was changed several times, so this list is divided into several sections.

== List ==
Independent Beiyang clique, etc. Progressive Communications Kuomintang (Nationalist) Democratic Progressive

=== Premiers of the Cabinet (1912–1914) ===
- Period: 13 March 1912 – 1 May 1914

According to the Provisional Constitution of Republic of China, which was passed in 1912, the leader of the majority party or the majority coalition should be appointed premier by the president.

No.	Portrait	Name (Birth–Death)	Term of office Duration in years and days		Cabinet	Political party	Legislature (elected)	President
1		Tang Shaoyi 唐紹儀 (1862–1938)	13 March 1912	27 June 1912	Tang S. I	Communications Clique	Provisional (1912)	Yuan Shikai (Beiyang clique)
1		Tang Shaoyi 唐紹儀 (1862–1938)	106 days		Tang S. I	Communications Clique	Provisional (1912)	Yuan Shikai (Beiyang clique)
2		Lu Zhengxiang 陸徵祥; Lù Zhēngxiáng (1871–1949)	29 June 1912	22 September 1912	Lu I	Independent	Provisional (1912)	Yuan Shikai (Beiyang clique)
2		Lu Zhengxiang 陸徵祥; Lù Zhēngxiáng (1871–1949)	85 days		Lu I	Independent	Provisional (1912)	Yuan Shikai (Beiyang clique)
3		Zhao Bingjun 趙秉鈞 (1859–1914)	25 September 1912	16 July 1913	Zhao	Independent	Provisional (1912)	Yuan Shikai (Beiyang clique)
3		Zhao Bingjun 趙秉鈞 (1859–1914)	25 September 1912	16 July 1913	Zhao	Independent	1st (1912)	Yuan Shikai (Beiyang clique)
3		Zhao Bingjun 趙秉鈞 (1859–1914)	294 days		Zhao	Independent	1st (1912)	Yuan Shikai (Beiyang clique)
—		Duan Qirui 段祺瑞 (1865–1936) acting	19 July 1913	31 July 1913	Duan Provisional	Beiyang clique	1st (1912)	Yuan Shikai (Beiyang clique)
—		Duan Qirui 段祺瑞 (1865–1936) acting	12 days		Duan Provisional	Beiyang clique	1st (1912)	Yuan Shikai (Beiyang clique)
4		Xiong Xiling 熊希齡 (1870–1937)	31 July 1913	12 February 1914	Xiong	Independent	1st (1912)	Yuan Shikai (Beiyang clique)
4		Xiong Xiling 熊希齡 (1870–1937)	196 days		Xiong	Independent	1st (1912)	Yuan Shikai (Beiyang clique)
—		Sun Baoqi 孫寶琦 (1867–1931) acting	12 February 1914	1 May 1914	Sun B. Provisional	Independent	1st (1912)	Yuan Shikai (Beiyang clique)
—		Sun Baoqi 孫寶琦 (1867–1931) acting	78 days		Sun B. Provisional	Independent	1st (1912)	Yuan Shikai (Beiyang clique)

=== Secretaries of State (1914–1916) ===
- Period: 1 May 1914 – 21 December 1915; 22 March 1916 – 29 June 1916

No.	Portrait	Name (Birth–Death)	Term of office Duration in years and days		Cabinet	Political party	Legislature (elected)	President
5		Xu Shichang 徐世昌 (1855–1939)	1 May 1914	21 December 1915	Xu S.-C. I	Beiyang clique	1st (1912)	Yuan Shikai (Beiyang clique)
5		Xu Shichang 徐世昌 (1855–1939)	1 year, 234 days		Xu S.-C. I	Beiyang clique	1st (1912)	Yuan Shikai (Beiyang clique)
(2)		Lu Zhengxiang 陸徵祥; Lù Zhēngxiáng (1871–1949)	22 December 1915	22 March 1916	Lu II	Independent	1st (1912)	Yuan Shikai (Beiyang clique)
(2)		Lu Zhengxiang 陸徵祥; Lù Zhēngxiáng (1871–1949)	91 days		Lu II	Independent	1st (1912)	Yuan Shikai (Beiyang clique)
(5)		Xu Shichang 徐世昌 (1855–1939)	22 March 1916	22 April 1916	Xu S.-C. II	Beiyang clique	1st (1912)	Yuan Shikai (Beiyang clique)
(5)		Xu Shichang 徐世昌 (1855–1939)	31 days		Xu S.-C. II	Beiyang clique	1st (1912)	Yuan Shikai (Beiyang clique)
6		Duan Qirui 段祺瑞 (1865–1936)	22 April 1916	29 June 1916	Duan I	Beiyang clique	1st (1912)	Yuan Shikai (Beiyang clique)
6		Duan Qirui 段祺瑞 (1865–1936)	22 April 1916	29 June 1916	Duan I	Beiyang clique	1st (1912)	Li Yuanhong (Progressive Party)
6		Duan Qirui 段祺瑞 (1865–1936)	68 days		Duan I	Beiyang clique	1st (1912)	Li Yuanhong (Progressive Party)

=== Premiers of the State Council (1916–1928) ===
- Period: 29 June 1916 – 3 June 1928

No.	Portrait	Name (Birth–Death)	Term of office Duration in years and days		Cabinet	Political party	Legislature (elected)	President
(6)		Duan Qirui 段祺瑞 (1865–1936)	29 June 1916	23 May 1917	Duan I Reshuffled	Beiyang clique	1st (1912)	Li Yuanhong (Progressive Party)
(6)		Duan Qirui 段祺瑞 (1865–1936)	328 days		Duan I Reshuffled	Beiyang clique	1st (1912)	Li Yuanhong (Progressive Party)
—		Wu Tingfang 伍廷芳 (1842–1922) acting	23 May 1917	12 June 1917	Wu T. Provisional	Independent	1st (1912)	Li Yuanhong (Progressive Party)
—		Wu Tingfang 伍廷芳 (1842–1922) acting	20 days		Wu T. Provisional	Independent	1st (1912)	Li Yuanhong (Progressive Party)
—		Jiang Chaozong 江朝宗 (1861–1943) acting	12 June 1917	24 June 1917	Jiang C. Provisional	Beiyang clique	1st (1912)	Li Yuanhong (Progressive Party)
—		Jiang Chaozong 江朝宗 (1861–1943) acting	12 days		Jiang C. Provisional	Beiyang clique	1st (1912)	Li Yuanhong (Progressive Party)
7		Li Jingxi 李經羲 (1857–1925)	25 June 1917	2 July 1917	Li	Independent	1st (1912)	Li Yuanhong (Progressive Party)
7		Li Jingxi 李經羲 (1857–1925)	8 days		Li	Independent	1st (1912)	Li Yuanhong (Progressive Party)
During this interval, Zhang Xun was the prime minister of the Restored Qing Imperial Government.							1st (1912)	Li Yuanhong (Progressive Party)
(6)		Duan Qirui 段祺瑞 (1865–1936)	14 July 1917	22 November 1917	Duan II	Anhui clique	1st (1912)	Feng Guozhang (Zhili clique) acting
(6)		Duan Qirui 段祺瑞 (1865–1936)	131 days		Duan II	Anhui clique	1st (1912)	Feng Guozhang (Zhili clique) acting
—		Wang Daxie 汪大燮 (1859–1929) acting	22 November 1917	30 November 1917	Duan II	Research Clique	1st (1912)	Feng Guozhang (Zhili clique) acting
—		Wang Daxie 汪大燮 (1859–1929) acting	8 days		Duan II	Research Clique	1st (1912)	Feng Guozhang (Zhili clique) acting
8		Wang Shizhen 王士珍 (1861–1930)	30 November 1917	23 March 1918	Wang S.	Zhili clique	1st (1912)	Feng Guozhang (Zhili clique) acting
8		Wang Shizhen 王士珍 (1861–1930)	113 days		Wang S.	Zhili clique	1st (1912)	Feng Guozhang (Zhili clique) acting
(6)		Duan Qirui 段祺瑞 (1865–1936)	23 March 1918	10 October 1918	Duan III	Anhui clique	2nd (1918)	Feng Guozhang (Zhili clique) acting
(6)		Duan Qirui 段祺瑞 (1865–1936)	201 days		Duan III	Anhui clique	2nd (1918)	Feng Guozhang (Zhili clique) acting
—		Qian Nengxun 錢能訓 (1869–1924)	10 October 1918	20 December 1918	Qian Provisional	Independent	2nd (1918)	Xu Shichang (Anhui clique)
—		Qian Nengxun 錢能訓 (1869–1924)	71 days		Qian Provisional	Independent	2nd (1918)	Xu Shichang (Anhui clique)
9		Qian Nengxun 錢能訓 (1869–1924)	20 December 1918	13 June 1919	Qian	Independent	2nd (1918)	Xu Shichang (Anhui clique)
9		Qian Nengxun 錢能訓 (1869–1924)	175 days		Qian	Independent	2nd (1918)	Xu Shichang (Anhui clique)
—		Gong Xinzhan 龔心湛 (1871–1943) acting	13 June 1919	24 September 1919	Gong Provisional	Independent	2nd (1918)	Xu Shichang (Anhui clique)
—		Gong Xinzhan 龔心湛 (1871–1943) acting	103 days		Gong Provisional	Independent	2nd (1918)	Xu Shichang (Anhui clique)
—		Jin Yunpeng 靳雲鵬 (1877–1951)	24 September 1919	5 November 1919	Jin Provisional	Anhui clique	2nd (1918)	Xu Shichang (Anhui clique)
—		Jin Yunpeng 靳雲鵬 (1877–1951)	42 days		Jin Provisional	Anhui clique	2nd (1918)	Xu Shichang (Anhui clique)
10		Jin Yunpeng 靳雲鵬 (1877–1951)	5 November 1919	14 May 1920	Jin I	Anhui clique	2nd (1918)	Xu Shichang (Anhui clique)
10		Jin Yunpeng 靳雲鵬 (1877–1951)	191 days		Jin I	Anhui clique	2nd (1918)	Xu Shichang (Anhui clique)
—		Sa Zhenbing 薩鎮冰 (1859–1952) acting	2 July 1920	9 August 1920	Sa Provisional	Independent	2nd (1918)	Xu Shichang (Anhui clique)
—		Sa Zhenbing 薩鎮冰 (1859–1952) acting	38 days		Sa Provisional	Independent	2nd (1918)	Xu Shichang (Anhui clique)
(10)		Jin Yunpeng 靳雲鵬 (1877–1951)	9 August 1920	14 May 1921	Jin II	Anhui clique	2nd (1918)	Xu Shichang (Anhui clique)
(10)		Jin Yunpeng 靳雲鵬 (1877–1951)	278 days		Jin II	Anhui clique	2nd (1918)	Xu Shichang (Anhui clique)
(10)		Jin Yunpeng 靳雲鵬 (1877–1951)	14 May 1921	18 December 1921	Jin III	Anhui clique	2nd (1918)	Xu Shichang (Anhui clique)
(10)		Jin Yunpeng 靳雲鵬 (1877–1951)	218 days		Jin III	Anhui clique	2nd (1918)	Xu Shichang (Anhui clique)
—		Yan Huiqing (W.W. Yan) 顏惠慶 (1877–1950) acting	18 December 1921	24 December 1921	Yan H. Provisional I	Independent	2nd (1918)	Xu Shichang (Anhui clique)
—		Yan Huiqing (W.W. Yan) 顏惠慶 (1877–1950) acting	6 days		Yan H. Provisional I	Independent	2nd (1918)	Xu Shichang (Anhui clique)
11		Liang Shiyi 梁士詒 (1869–1933)	24 December 1921	25 January 1922	Liang	Communications Clique	2nd (1918)	Xu Shichang (Anhui clique)
11		Liang Shiyi 梁士詒 (1869–1933)	32 days		Liang	Communications Clique	2nd (1918)	Xu Shichang (Anhui clique)
—		Yan Huiqing (W.W. Yan) 顏惠慶 (1877–1950) acting	25 January 1922	8 April 1922	Yan H. Provisional II	Independent	2nd (1918)	Xu Shichang (Anhui clique)
—		Yan Huiqing (W.W. Yan) 顏惠慶 (1877–1950) acting	73 days		Yan H. Provisional II	Independent	2nd (1918)	Xu Shichang (Anhui clique)
—		Zhou Ziqi 周自齊 (1869–1923) acting	8 April 1922	11 June 1922	Zhou Provisional	Communications Clique	2nd (1918)	Xu Shichang (Anhui clique)
—		Zhou Ziqi 周自齊 (1869–1923) acting	65 days		Zhou Provisional	Communications Clique	2nd (1918)	Xu Shichang (Anhui clique)
12		Yan Huiqing (W.W. Yan) 顏惠慶 (1877–1950)	12 June 1922	5 August 1922 (Note: Resigned on 31 July.)	Yan H. I	Independent	2nd (1918)	Li Yuanhong (Research Clique)
12		Yan Huiqing (W.W. Yan) 顏惠慶 (1877–1950)	54 days		Yan H. I	Independent	2nd (1918)	Li Yuanhong (Research Clique)
—		Wang Chonghui 王寵惠 (1881–1958) acting	31 July 1922	19 September 1922	Tang S. II	Independent	2nd (1918)	Li Yuanhong (Research Clique)
—		Wang Chonghui 王寵惠 (1881–1958) acting	50 days		Tang S. II	Independent	2nd (1918)	Li Yuanhong (Research Clique)
(1)		Tang Shaoyi 唐紹儀 (1862–1938) (Note: Did not assume office.)	5 August 1922	19 September 1922	Tang S. II	Communications Clique	2nd (1918)	Li Yuanhong (Research Clique)
(1)		Tang Shaoyi 唐紹儀 (1862–1938)	45 days		Tang S. II	Communications Clique	2nd (1918)	Li Yuanhong (Research Clique)
13		Wang Chonghui 王寵惠 (1881–1958)	19 September 1922	29 November 1922	Wang C.	Independent	2nd (1918)	Li Yuanhong (Research Clique)
13		Wang Chonghui 王寵惠 (1881–1958)	71 days		Wang C.	Independent	2nd (1918)	Li Yuanhong (Research Clique)
14		Wang Daxie 汪大燮 (1859–1929)	29 November 1922	11 December 1922	Wang D.	Research Clique	2nd (1918)	Li Yuanhong (Research Clique)
14		Wang Daxie 汪大燮 (1859–1929)	12 days		Wang D.	Research Clique	2nd (1918)	Li Yuanhong (Research Clique)
—		Wang Zhengting 王正廷 (1882–1961) acting	11 December 1922	4 January 1923	Wang Z. Provisional	Independent	2nd (1918)	Li Yuanhong (Research Clique)
—		Wang Zhengting 王正廷 (1882–1961) acting	24 days		Wang Z. Provisional	Independent	2nd (1918)	Li Yuanhong (Research Clique)
15		Zhang Shaozeng 張紹曾 (1879–1928)	4 January 1923	13 June 1923	Zhang	Independent	2nd (1918)	Li Yuanhong (Research Clique)
15		Zhang Shaozeng 張紹曾 (1879–1928)	160 days		Zhang	Independent	2nd (1918)	Li Yuanhong (Research Clique)
—		Gao Lingwei 高凌霨 (1870–1940) acting	14 June 1923	12 October 1923	Gao Acting	Zhili clique	2nd (1918)	Premier as acting President
—		Gao Lingwei 高凌霨 (1870–1940) acting	120 days		Gao Acting	Zhili clique	2nd (1918)	Premier as acting President
—		Gao Lingwei 高凌霨 (1870–1940) acting	12 October 1923	12 January 1924	Gao Provisional	Zhili clique	1st (1912)	Cao Kun (Zhili clique)
—		Gao Lingwei 高凌霨 (1870–1940) acting	92 days		Gao Provisional	Zhili clique	1st (1912)	Cao Kun (Zhili clique)
16		Sun Baoqi 孫寶琦 (1867–1931)	12 January 1924	2 July 1924	Sun B.	Independent	1st (1912)	Cao Kun (Zhili clique)
16		Sun Baoqi 孫寶琦 (1867–1931)	172 days		Sun B.	Independent	1st (1912)	Cao Kun (Zhili clique)
—		V. S. Wellington Koo 顧維鈞; Gù Wéijūn (1888–1985) acting	2 July 1924	14 September 1924	Koo Provisional	Independent	1st (1912)	Cao Kun (Zhili clique)
—		V. S. Wellington Koo 顧維鈞; Gù Wéijūn (1888–1985) acting	74 days		Koo Provisional	Independent	1st (1912)	Cao Kun (Zhili clique)
(12)		Yan Huiqing (W.W. Yan) 顏惠慶 (1877–1950)	14 September 1924	31 October 1924	Yan H. II	Independent	1st (1912)	Cao Kun (Zhili clique)
(12)		Yan Huiqing (W.W. Yan) 顏惠慶 (1877–1950)	47 days		Yan H. II	Independent	1st (1912)	Cao Kun (Zhili clique)
—		Huang Fu 黃郛 (1880–1936) acting	31 October 1924	24 November 1924	Huang Acting	Political Science Clique	1st (1912)	Premier as acting President
—		Huang Fu 黃郛 (1880–1936) acting	24 days		Huang Acting	Political Science Clique	1st (1912)	Premier as acting President
The premiership was abolished from 25 November 1924 to 26 December 1925.							1st (1912)	Duan Qirui (Anhui clique)
17		Xu Shiying 許世英 (1873–1964)	26 December 1925	4 March 1926	Xu S.-Y.	Anhui clique	Dissolved	Duan Qirui (Anhui clique)
17		Xu Shiying 許世英 (1873–1964)	68 days		Xu S.-Y.	Anhui clique	Dissolved	Duan Qirui (Anhui clique)
18		Jia Deyao 賈德耀 (1880–1941)	4 March 1926	20 April 1926	Jia	Anhui clique	Dissolved	Duan Qirui (Anhui clique)
18		Jia Deyao 賈德耀 (1880–1941)	47 days		Jia	Anhui clique	Dissolved	Duan Qirui (Anhui clique)
—		Hu Weide 胡惟德 (1863–1933) acting	20 April 1926	13 May 1926	Hu Provisional Acting	Zhili clique	Dissolved	Premier as acting President
—		Hu Weide 胡惟德 (1863–1933) acting	23 days		Hu Provisional Acting	Zhili clique	Dissolved	Premier as acting President
—		Yan Huiqing (W.W. Yan) 顏惠慶 (1877–1950) acting	13 May 1926	22 June 1926	Yan H. Acting	Independent	Dissolved	Premier as acting President
—		Yan Huiqing (W.W. Yan) 顏惠慶 (1877–1950) acting	40 days		Yan H. Acting	Independent	Dissolved	Premier as acting President
—		Du Xigui 杜錫珪 (1874–1933) acting	22 June 1926	1 October 1926	Du Provisional Acting	Zhili clique	Dissolved	Premier as acting President
—		Du Xigui 杜錫珪 (1874–1933) acting	101 days		Du Provisional Acting	Zhili clique	Dissolved	Premier as acting President
—		V. S. Wellington Koo 顧維鈞; Gù Wéijūn (1888–1985)	1 October 1926	11 January 1927	Koo Provisional Acting	Independent	Dissolved	Premier as acting President
—		V. S. Wellington Koo 顧維鈞; Gù Wéijūn (1888–1985)	102 days		Koo Provisional Acting	Independent	Dissolved	Premier as acting President
19		V. S. Wellington Koo 顧維鈞; Gù Wéijūn (1888–1985)	11 January 1927	16 June 1927	Koo Acting	Independent	Dissolved	Premier as acting President
19		V. S. Wellington Koo 顧維鈞; Gù Wéijūn (1888–1985)	156 days		Koo Acting	Independent	Dissolved	Premier as acting President
20		Pan Fu 潘復 (1883–1936)	20 June 1927	3 June 1928	Pan	Independent	Dissolved	Zhang Zuolin (Fengtian clique)
20		Pan Fu 潘復 (1883–1936)	349 days		Pan	Independent	Dissolved	Zhang Zuolin (Fengtian clique)

=== Presidents of the Executive Yuan of the National Government (1928–1948) ===
Period: 25 October 1928 – 24 May 1948

When Chiang Kai-shek established the Nanking Nationalist government in 1928, he created a presidency for the Executive Yuan instead of a premiership, in order to show the difference between his government and the previous one in Peking (then renamed Beiping). This government moved to Chongqing during the Sino-Japanese War (1937–1945) and during the Chinese Civil War relocated to Taipei where it exists today.

No.	Portrait	Name (Birth–Death)	Term of office Duration in years and days		Cabinet	Political party	Chairman
21		Tan Yankai 譚延闓; Tán Yánkǎi (1880–1930)	25 October 1928	22 September 1930	Tan	Kuomintang	
21		Tan Yankai 譚延闓; Tán Yánkǎi (1880–1930)	25 October 1928	22 September 1930	Tan	Kuomintang	Chiang Kai-shek (Kuomintang)
21		Tan Yankai 譚延闓; Tán Yánkǎi (1880–1930)	1 year, 332 days		Tan	Kuomintang	Chiang Kai-shek (Kuomintang)
—		Soong Tse-ven (T.V. Soong) 宋子文; Sòng Zǐwén (1894–1971) acting	25 September 1930	18 November 1930	Tan	Kuomintang	Chiang Kai-shek (Kuomintang)
—		Soong Tse-ven (T.V. Soong) 宋子文; Sòng Zǐwén (1894–1971) acting	54 days		Tan	Kuomintang	Chiang Kai-shek (Kuomintang)
22		Chiang Kai-shek 蔣中正; Jiǎng Zhōngzhèng (1887–1975)	18 November 1930	15 December 1931	Chiang K. I	Kuomintang	Chiang Kai-shek (Kuomintang)
22		Chiang Kai-shek 蔣中正; Jiǎng Zhōngzhèng (1887–1975)	1 year, 27 days		Chiang K. I	Kuomintang	Chiang Kai-shek (Kuomintang)
—		Chen Mingshu 陳銘樞; Chén Míngshū (1889–1965) acting	15 December 1931	28 December 1931	—	Kuomintang	Lin Sen (Kuomintang)
—		Chen Mingshu 陳銘樞; Chén Míngshū (1889–1965) acting	13 days		—	Kuomintang	Lin Sen (Kuomintang)
23		Sun Fo 孫科; Sūn Kē (1891–1973)	28 December 1931	28 January 1932	Sun F. I	Kuomintang	Lin Sen (Kuomintang)
23		Sun Fo 孫科; Sūn Kē (1891–1973)	31 days		Sun F. I	Kuomintang	Lin Sen (Kuomintang)
24		Wang Jingwei 汪兆銘; Wāng Zhàomíng (1883–1944)	28 January 1932	1 December 1935	Wang	Kuomintang	Lin Sen (Kuomintang)
24		Wang Jingwei 汪兆銘; Wāng Zhàomíng (1883–1944)	3 years, 307 days		Wang	Kuomintang	Lin Sen (Kuomintang)
(22)		Chiang Kai-shek 蔣中正; Jiǎng Zhōngzhèng (1887–1975)	7 December 1935	1 January 1938	Chiang K. II	Kuomintang	Lin Sen (Kuomintang)
(22)		Chiang Kai-shek 蔣中正; Jiǎng Zhōngzhèng (1887–1975)	2 years, 25 days		Chiang K. II	Kuomintang	Lin Sen (Kuomintang)
25		Kung Hsiang-hsi (H.H. Kung) 孔祥熙; Kǒng Xiángxī (1881–1967)	1 January 1938	25 November 1939	Kung	Kuomintang	Lin Sen (Kuomintang)
25		Kung Hsiang-hsi (H.H. Kung) 孔祥熙; Kǒng Xiángxī (1881–1967)	1 year, 328 days		Kung	Kuomintang	Lin Sen (Kuomintang)
(22)		Chiang Kai-shek 蔣中正; Jiǎng Zhōngzhèng (1887–1975)	11 December 1939	31 May 1945	Chiang K. III	Kuomintang	Lin Sen (Kuomintang)
(22)		Chiang Kai-shek 蔣中正; Jiǎng Zhōngzhèng (1887–1975)	11 December 1939	31 May 1945	Chiang K. III	Kuomintang	Chiang Kai-shek (Kuomintang)
(22)		Chiang Kai-shek 蔣中正; Jiǎng Zhōngzhèng (1887–1975)	5 years, 171 days		Chiang K. III	Kuomintang	Chiang Kai-shek (Kuomintang)
26		Soong Tse-ven (T.V. Soong) 宋子文; Sòng Zǐwén (1894–1971)	31 May 1945	1 March 1947	Soong	Kuomintang	Chiang Kai-shek (Kuomintang)
26		Soong Tse-ven (T.V. Soong) 宋子文; Sòng Zǐwén (1894–1971)	1 year, 274 days		Soong	Kuomintang	Chiang Kai-shek (Kuomintang)
—		Chiang Kai-shek 蔣中正; Jiǎng Zhōngzhèng (1887–1975) acting	1 March 1947	23 April 1947	—	Kuomintang	Chiang Kai-shek (Kuomintang)
—		Chiang Kai-shek 蔣中正; Jiǎng Zhōngzhèng (1887–1975) acting	48 days		—	Kuomintang	Chiang Kai-shek (Kuomintang)
27		Zhang Qun 張群; Zhāng Qún (1889–1990)	23 April 1947	24 May 1948	Zhang Qun	Kuomintang	Chiang Kai-shek (Kuomintang)
27		Zhang Qun 張群; Zhāng Qún (1889–1990)	1 year, 31 days		Zhang Qun	Kuomintang	Chiang Kai-shek (Kuomintang)

=== Presidents of the Executive Yuan (1948–present) ===
- Period: 25 May 1948 – present

No.	Portrait	Name (Birth–Death)	Term of office Duration in years and days		Cabinet	Political party	Legislature (elected)	President
28		Weng Wenhao 翁文灝; Wēng Wénhào (1889–1971)	25 May 1948	26 November 1948	Weng	Kuomintang	1st (1948)	Chiang Kai-shek (Kuomintang)
28		Weng Wenhao 翁文灝; Wēng Wénhào (1889–1971)	185 days		Weng	Kuomintang	1st (1948)	Chiang Kai-shek (Kuomintang)
(23)		Sun Fo 孫科; Sūn Kē (1891–1973)	26 November 1948	12 March 1949	Sun F. II	Kuomintang	1st (1948)	Chiang Kai-shek (Kuomintang)
(23)		Sun Fo 孫科; Sūn Kē (1891–1973)	106 days		Sun F. II	Kuomintang	1st (1948)	Chiang Kai-shek (Kuomintang)
29		He Yingqin 何應欽; Hé Yìngqīn (1890–1987)	12 March 1949	13 June 1949	He	Kuomintang	1st (1948)	Chiang Kai-shek (Kuomintang)
29		He Yingqin 何應欽; Hé Yìngqīn (1890–1987)	12 March 1949	13 June 1949	He	Kuomintang	1st (1948)	Li Zongren (KMT) acting
29		He Yingqin 何應欽; Hé Yìngqīn (1890–1987)	93 days		He	Kuomintang	1st (1948)	Li Zongren (KMT) acting
30		Yan Xishan 閻錫山; Yán Xíshān (1883–1960)	13 June 1949	10 March 1950	Yan X.	Kuomintang	1st (1948)	Li Zongren (KMT) acting
30		Yan Xishan 閻錫山; Yán Xíshān (1883–1960)	13 June 1949	10 March 1950	Yan X.	Kuomintang	1st (1948)	Chiang Kai-shek (Kuomintang)
30		Yan Xishan 閻錫山; Yán Xíshān (1883–1960)	270 days		Yan X.	Kuomintang	1st (1948)	Chiang Kai-shek (Kuomintang)
31		Chen Cheng 陳誠; Chén Chéng (1898–1965)	10 March 1950	1 June 1954	Chen C. I	Kuomintang	1st (1948)	Chiang Kai-shek (Kuomintang)
31		Chen Cheng 陳誠; Chén Chéng (1898–1965)	4 years, 83 days		Chen C. I	Kuomintang	1st (1948)	Chiang Kai-shek (Kuomintang)
32		Yu Hung-Chun 俞鴻鈞; Yú Hóngjūn (1897–1960)	1 June 1954	15 July 1958	Yu H.	Kuomintang	1st (1948)	Chiang Kai-shek (Kuomintang)
32		Yu Hung-Chun 俞鴻鈞; Yú Hóngjūn (1897–1960)	4 years, 44 days		Yu H.	Kuomintang	1st (1948)	Chiang Kai-shek (Kuomintang)
(31)		Chen Cheng 陳誠; Chén Chéng (1898–1965)	15 July 1958	16 December 1963	Chen C. II	Kuomintang	1st (1948)	Chiang Kai-shek (Kuomintang)
(31)		Chen Cheng 陳誠; Chén Chéng (1898–1965)	5 years, 154 days		Chen C. II	Kuomintang	1st (1948)	Chiang Kai-shek (Kuomintang)
33		Yen Chia-kan (C. K. Yen) 嚴家淦; Yán Jiāgàn (1905–1993)	16 December 1963	1 June 1972	Yen	Kuomintang	1st (1948)	Chiang Kai-shek (Kuomintang)
33		Yen Chia-kan (C. K. Yen) 嚴家淦; Yán Jiāgàn (1905–1993)	8 years, 168 days		Yen	Kuomintang	1st (1948)	Chiang Kai-shek (Kuomintang)
34		Chiang Ching-kuo 蔣經國; Jiǎng Jīngguó (1910–1988)	1 June 1972	20 May 1978	Chiang C.	Kuomintang	1st (1948)	Chiang Kai-shek (Kuomintang)
34		Chiang Ching-kuo 蔣經國; Jiǎng Jīngguó (1910–1988)	1 June 1972	20 May 1978	Chiang C.	Kuomintang	1st (1948)	Yen Chia-kan (Kuomintang)
34		Chiang Ching-kuo 蔣經國; Jiǎng Jīngguó (1910–1988)	5 years, 353 days		Chiang C.	Kuomintang	1st (1948)	Yen Chia-kan (Kuomintang)
—		Hsu Ching-chung 徐慶鐘; Xú Qìngzhōng (1907–1996) (acting)	20 May 1978	1 June 1978	Chiang C.	Kuomintang	1st (1948)	Chiang Ching-kuo (Kuomintang)
—		Hsu Ching-chung 徐慶鐘; Xú Qìngzhōng (1907–1996) (acting)	12 days		Chiang C.	Kuomintang	1st (1948)	Chiang Ching-kuo (Kuomintang)
35		Sun Yun-suan 孫運璿; Sūn Yùnxuán (1913–2006)	1 June 1978	24 February 1984	Sun Y.	Kuomintang	1st (1948)	Chiang Ching-kuo (Kuomintang)
35		Sun Yun-suan 孫運璿; Sūn Yùnxuán (1913–2006)	5 years, 268 days		Sun Y.	Kuomintang	1st (1948)	Chiang Ching-kuo (Kuomintang)
—		Chiu Chuang-huan 邱創煥; Qīu Chuànghuàn (1925–2020)	24 February 1984	1 June 1984	Sun Y.	Kuomintang	1st (1948)	Chiang Ching-kuo (Kuomintang)
—		Chiu Chuang-huan 邱創煥; Qīu Chuànghuàn (1925–2020)	98 days		Sun Y.	Kuomintang	1st (1948)	Chiang Ching-kuo (Kuomintang)
36		Yu Kuo-hwa 俞國華; Yú Guóhuá (1914–2000)	1 June 1984	1 June 1989	Yu K.	Kuomintang	1st (1948)	Chiang Ching-kuo (Kuomintang)
36		Yu Kuo-hwa 俞國華; Yú Guóhuá (1914–2000)	1 June 1984	1 June 1989	Yu K.	Kuomintang	1st (1948)	Lee Teng-hui (KMT)
36		Yu Kuo-hwa 俞國華; Yú Guóhuá (1914–2000)	5 years, 97 days		Yu K.	Kuomintang	1st (1948)	Lee Teng-hui (KMT)
37		Lee Huan 李煥; Lǐ Huàn (1917–2010)	1 June 1989	1 June 1990	Lee	Kuomintang	1st (1948)	Lee Teng-hui (KMT)
37		Lee Huan 李煥; Lǐ Huàn (1917–2010)	1 year, 0 days		Lee	Kuomintang	1st (1948)	Lee Teng-hui (KMT)
38		Hau Pei-tsun 郝柏村; Hǎo Bócūn (1919–2020)	1 June 1990	27 February 1993	Hau	Kuomintang	1st (1948)	Lee Teng-hui (KMT)
38		Hau Pei-tsun 郝柏村; Hǎo Bócūn (1919–2020)	2 years, 271 days		Hau	Kuomintang	1st (1948)	Lee Teng-hui (KMT)
39		Lien Chan 連戰; Lián Zhàn (1936–)	27 February 1993	1 September 1997	Lien	Kuomintang	2nd (1992)	Lee Teng-hui (KMT)
39		Lien Chan 連戰; Lián Zhàn (1936–)	4 years, 186 days		Lien	Kuomintang	3rd (1995)	Lee Teng-hui (KMT)
40		Siew Wan-chang (Vincent Siew) 蕭萬長; Xiāo Wàncháng (1939–)	1 September 1997	20 May 2000	Siew	Kuomintang	3rd (1995)	Lee Teng-hui (KMT)
40		Siew Wan-chang (Vincent Siew) 蕭萬長; Xiāo Wàncháng (1939–)	2 years, 262 days		Siew	Kuomintang	4th (1998)	Lee Teng-hui (KMT)
41		Tang Fei 唐飛; Táng Fēi (1932–)	20 May 2000	6 October 2000	Tang F.	Kuomintang	4th (1998)	Chen Shui-bian (DPP)
41		Tang Fei 唐飛; Táng Fēi (1932–)	139 days		Tang F.	Kuomintang	4th (1998)	Chen Shui-bian (DPP)
42		Chang Chun-hsiung 張俊雄; Zhāng Jùnxióng (1938–2025)	6 October 2000	1 February 2002	Chang C.-H. I	Democratic Progressive	4th (1998)	Chen Shui-bian (DPP)
42		Chang Chun-hsiung 張俊雄; Zhāng Jùnxióng (1938–2025)	1 year, 118 days		Chang C.-H. I	Democratic Progressive	4th (1998)	Chen Shui-bian (DPP)
43		Yu Shyi-kun 游錫堃; Yóu Xíkūn (1948–)	1 February 2002	1 February 2005	Yu S.	Democratic Progressive	5th (2001)	Chen Shui-bian (DPP)
43		Yu Shyi-kun 游錫堃; Yóu Xíkūn (1948–)	3 years, 0 days		Yu S.	Democratic Progressive	5th (2001)	Chen Shui-bian (DPP)
44		Hsieh Chang-ting (Frank Hsieh) 謝長廷; Xiè Chángtíng (1946–)	1 February 2005	25 January 2006	Hsieh	Democratic Progressive	6th (2004)	Chen Shui-bian (DPP)
44		Hsieh Chang-ting (Frank Hsieh) 謝長廷; Xiè Chángtíng (1946–)	358 days		Hsieh	Democratic Progressive	6th (2004)	Chen Shui-bian (DPP)
45		Su Tseng-chang 蘇貞昌; Sū Zhēnchāng (1948–)	25 January 2006	21 May 2007	Su I	Democratic Progressive	6th (2004)	Chen Shui-bian (DPP)
45		Su Tseng-chang 蘇貞昌; Sū Zhēnchāng (1948–)	1 year, 116 days		Su I	Democratic Progressive	6th (2004)	Chen Shui-bian (DPP)
(42)		Chang Chun-hsiung 張俊雄; Zhāng Jùnxióng (1938–2025)	21 May 2007	20 May 2008	Chang C.-H. II	Democratic Progressive	6th (2004)	Chen Shui-bian (DPP)
(42)		Chang Chun-hsiung 張俊雄; Zhāng Jùnxióng (1938–2025)	365 days		Chang C.-H. II	Democratic Progressive	7th (2008)	Chen Shui-bian (DPP)
46		Liu Chao-shiuan 劉兆玄; Liú Zhàoxuán (1943–)	20 May 2008	10 September 2009	Liu	Kuomintang	7th (2008)	Ma Ying-jeou (Kuomintang)
46		Liu Chao-shiuan 劉兆玄; Liú Zhàoxuán (1943–)	1 year, 113 days		Liu	Kuomintang	7th (2008)	Ma Ying-jeou (Kuomintang)
47		Wu Den-yih 吳敦義; Wú Dūnyì (1948–)	10 September 2009	6 February 2012	Wu D.	Kuomintang	7th (2008)	Ma Ying-jeou (Kuomintang)
47		Wu Den-yih 吳敦義; Wú Dūnyì (1948–)	2 years, 149 days		Wu D.	Kuomintang	7th (2008)	Ma Ying-jeou (Kuomintang)
48		Chen Chun (Sean Chen) 陳冲; Chén Chōng (1949–)	6 February 2012	18 February 2013	S. Chen	Kuomintang	8th (2012)	Ma Ying-jeou (Kuomintang)
48		Chen Chun (Sean Chen) 陳冲; Chén Chōng (1949–)	1 year, 12 days		S. Chen	Kuomintang	8th (2012)	Ma Ying-jeou (Kuomintang)
49		Jiang Yi-huah 江宜樺; Jiāng Yīhuá (1960–)	18 February 2013	8 December 2014	Jiang	Kuomintang	8th (2012)	Ma Ying-jeou (Kuomintang)
49		Jiang Yi-huah 江宜樺; Jiāng Yīhuá (1960–)	1 year, 293 days		Jiang	Kuomintang	8th (2012)	Ma Ying-jeou (Kuomintang)
50		Mao Chi-kuo 毛治國; Máo Zhìguó (1948–)	8 December 2014	1 February 2016	Mao	Kuomintang	8th (2012)	Ma Ying-jeou (Kuomintang)
50		Mao Chi-kuo 毛治國; Máo Zhìguó (1948–)	1 year, 55 days		Mao	Kuomintang	8th (2012)	Ma Ying-jeou (Kuomintang)
51		Chang San-cheng (Simon Chang) 張善政; Zhāng Shànzhèng (1954–)	1 February 2016	20 May 2016	S. Chang	Independent	9th (2016)	Ma Ying-jeou (Kuomintang)
51		Chang San-cheng (Simon Chang) 張善政; Zhāng Shànzhèng (1954–)	109 days		S. Chang	Independent	9th (2016)	Ma Ying-jeou (Kuomintang)
52		Lin Chuan 林全; Lín Quán (1951–)	20 May 2016	8 September 2017	Lin	Independent	9th (2016)	Tsai Ing-wen (DPP)
52		Lin Chuan 林全; Lín Quán (1951–)	1 year, 111 days		Lin	Independent	9th (2016)	Tsai Ing-wen (DPP)
53		Lai Ching-te (William Lai) 賴清德; Lài Qīngdé (1958–)	8 September 2017	14 January 2019	Lai	Democratic Progressive	9th (2016)	Tsai Ing-wen (DPP)
53		Lai Ching-te (William Lai) 賴清德; Lài Qīngdé (1958–)	1 year, 128 days		Lai	Democratic Progressive	9th (2016)	Tsai Ing-wen (DPP)
(45)		Su Tseng-chang 蘇貞昌; Sū Zhēnchāng (1948–)	14 January 2019	31 January 2023	Su II	Democratic Progressive	9th (2016)	Tsai Ing-wen (DPP)
(45)		Su Tseng-chang 蘇貞昌; Sū Zhēnchāng (1948–)	4 years, 17 days		Su II	Democratic Progressive	10th (2020)	Tsai Ing-wen (DPP)
54		Chen Chien-jen 陳建仁; Chén Jiànrén (1951–)	31 January 2023	20 May 2024	Chen C.J.	Democratic Progressive	10th (2020)	Tsai Ing-wen (DPP)
54		Chen Chien-jen 陳建仁; Chén Jiànrén (1951–)	1 year, 110 days		Chen C.J.	Democratic Progressive	11th (2024)	Tsai Ing-wen (DPP)
55		Cho Jung-tai 卓榮泰; Zhuó Róngtài (1959–)	20 May 2024	Incumbent	Cho	Democratic Progressive	11th (2024)	Lai Ching-te (DPP)
55		Cho Jung-tai 卓榮泰; Zhuó Róngtài (1959–)	2 years, 181 days		Cho	Democratic Progressive	11th (2024)	Lai Ching-te (DPP)

== Rank in length by total tenure ==
Rank	Individual	Days		Assumed office	Left office	Notes
1	Chen Cheng	3524	1544	10 March 1950	1 June 1954	
1	Chen Cheng	3524	1980	15 July 1958	16 December 1963	
2	Chiang Kai-shek	3135	386	24 November 1930	15 December 1931	Pre-1947 Constitution
2	Chiang Kai-shek	3135	747	16 December 1935	1 January 1938	Pre-1947 Constitution
2	Chiang Kai-shek	3135	2002	11 December 1939	4 June 1945	Pre-1947 Constitution
3	Yen Chia-kan	3090		16 December 1963	1 June 1972	
4	Sun Yun-suan	2192		1 June 1978	1 June 1984	
5	Chiang Ching-kuo	2179		1 June 1972	20 May 1978	
6	Su Tseng-chang	1961	483	25 January 2006	21 May 2007	
6	Su Tseng-chang	1961	1478	14 January 2019	31 January 2023	
7	Yu Kuo-hua	1826		1 June 1984	1 June 1989	
8	Lien Chan	1647		27 February 1993	1 September 1997	
9	Yu Hung-chun	1505		1 June 1954	15 July 1958	
10	Wang Jingwei	1417		29 January 1932	16 December 1935	Pre-1947 Constitution
11	Yu Shyi-kun	1096		1 February 2002	1 February 2005	
12	Hau Pei-tsun	1002		1 June 1990	27 February 1993	
13	Vincent Siew	992		1 September 1997	20 May 2000	
14	Cho Jung-tai	911		20 May 2024	Incumbent	
15	Wu Den-yih	879		10 September 2009	6 February 2012	
16	Chang Chun-hsiung	848	483	6 October 2000	1 February 2002	
16	Chang Chun-hsiung	848	365	21 May 2007	20 May 2008	
17	H. H. Kung	709		1 January 1938	11 December 1939	Pre-1947 Constitution
18	Tan Yankai	697		25 October 1928	22 September 1930	Pre-1947 Constitution
19	Jiang Yi-huah	658		18 February 2013	8 December 2014	
20	T. V. Soong	635		4 June 1945	1 March 1947	Pre-1947 Constitution
21	William Lai	493		8 September 2017	14 January 2019	
22	Liu Chao-shiuan	478		20 May 2008	10 September 2009	
23	Lin Chuan	476		20 May 2016	8 September 2017	
24	Chen Chien-jen	475		31 January 2023	20 May 2024	
25	Mao Chi-kuo	420		8 December 2014	1 February 2016	
26	Chang Chun	402		23 April 1947	29 May 1948	Pre-1947 Constitution
27	Sean Chen	378		6 February 2012	18 February 2013	
28	Lee Huan	365		1 June 1989	1 June 1990	
29	Frank Hsieh	358		1 February 2005	25 January 2006	
30	Yan Xishan	275		13 June 1949	15 March 1950	
31	Weng Wenhao	208		29 May 1948	23 December 1948	
32	Tang Fei	139		20 May 2000	6 October 2000	
33	Sun Fo	119	28	1 January 1932	29 January 1932	Pre-1947 Constitution
33	Sun Fo	119	91	23 December 1948	24 March 1949	
34	Chang San-cheng	109		1 February 2016	20 May 2016	
35	He Yingqin	81		24 March 1949	13 June 1949	

== See also ==
- List of presidents of the Republic of China
- List of rulers of Taiwan
- List of vice presidents of the Republic of China
- Vice Premier of the Republic of China
- List of political office-holders of the Republic of China by age
