= Premier Wang =

Premier Wang may refer to:

- Chengting T. Wang (1882–1961), Acting Premier of the Republic of China
- Wang Chonghui (1881–1958), Premier of the Republic of China
- Wang Daxie (1860–1929), Premier of the Republic of China
- Wang Jingwei (1883–1944), 4th Premier of the Republic of China
- Wang Shizhen (Beiyang government) (1861–1930), Premier of the Republic of China
