= Premier Zhang =

Premier Zhang may refer to:

- Zhang Qun (1889–1990), 9th Premier of the Republic of China
- Zhang Shaozeng (1879–1928), Premier of the Republic of China

== Others ==
- Chang Chun-hsiung (張俊雄; pinyin: Zhāng Jùnxióng; born 1938), 17th and 21st Premier of the Republic of China
- Chang San-cheng (張善政; pinyin: Zhāng Shànzhèng; born 1954), 27th Premier of the Republic of China
