= Lei Zhenchun =

Lei Zhenchun (Chinese: 雷震春; pinyin: Léi Zhènchūn; 1864–1919; also Lei Chen-ch'un) was a military leader in the Republic of China. During the second revolution in 1913, General Lei raised a new 7th Division, which was sent to Yangzi and then to Shandong. In mid-1917, he set up a provisional government In Tianjin.

Preceded by Wang Shizhen	Minister of War of the Republic of China; July 1917	Succeeded by Duan Qirui
