= Duan Zhigui =

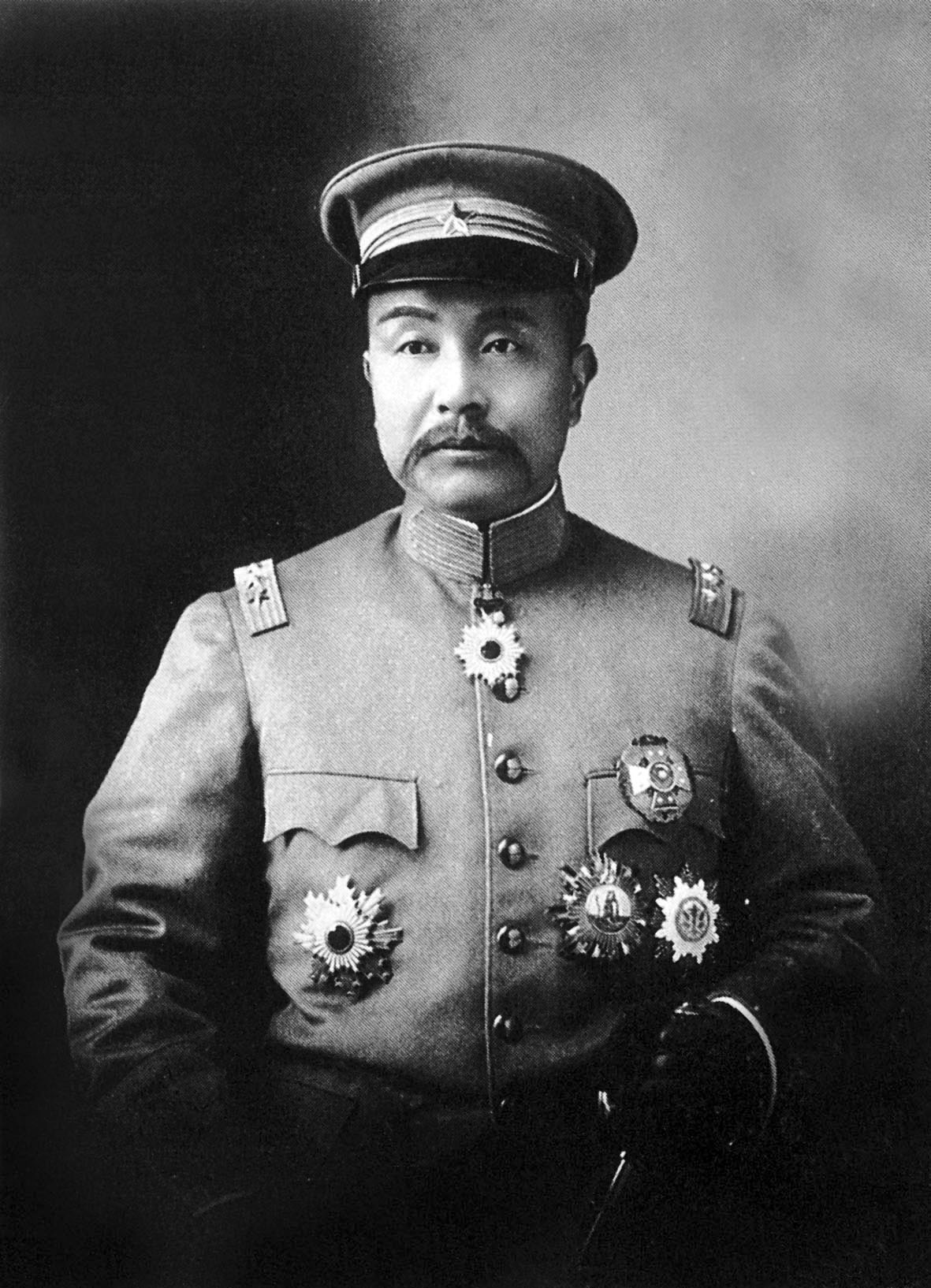
- Duan Zhigui
- Born: 段芝贵 1869; Hefei, Anhui, Qing dynasty
- Died: 1925; Tianjin, Republic of China
- Military career
- Allegiance: Qing dynasty (Republic of China (1912–1949)) Republic of China; Empire of China
- Rank: General
- Awards: Order of the Rising Sun; Order of Wen-Hu; Order of the Precious Brilliant Golden Grain; Order of Rank and Merit
- Other work: Minister of War

Duan Zhigui (simplified Chinese: 段芝贵; traditional Chinese: 段芝貴; pinyin: Duàn Zhīguì; IPA: [tu̯àn ʈ͡ʂīku̯èi̯] 1869 – March 1925) was a Chinese general. Born in Hefei, Anhui, he attained the post of Heilongjiang governor in the late Qing dynasty and between 1912 and 1913 was governor of Chahar and the military governor of Hubei between 1914 and 1915, as well as military and civil governor of Fengtian in 1915–16.

A staunch supporter of Yuan Shikai, he was nicknamed the "Adopted Prince", and when Duan Qirui, a fellow Hefei native, took the Beijing government in 1917, Duan was made a Minister of War; however, with Duan Qirui's defeat by 1920, Duan Zhigui fled to the Japanese embassy. He was remitted in 1922 and lived in Tianjin until his death there in 1925.

Preceded by Wang Shizhen	Minister of War of the Republic of China; 1917–1919	Succeeded by Jin Yunpeng
