= Medical Affairs Bureau =

Government agency of Taiwan

Coordinates: 25°04′47.5″N 121°32′35.4″E

- 軍醫局; Jūnyījú

Agency overview
- Formed: 1925; 100 years ago
- Headquarters: Zhongshan, Taipei, Taiwan
- Parent agency: Ministry of National Defense
- Website: Official website

The Medical Affairs Bureau (MAB; Chinese: 國防部軍醫局; pinyin: Guófángbù Jūnyījú) is the affiliated authority of the Ministry of National Defense of the Republic of China aimed to establish a streamlined and high quality military medical corps that provides armed forces with medical services to fulfill military build-up and combat missions.

== History ==
The bureau was established in 1925.

== Organizational structures ==
- Department of Medical Management
- Department of Medical Planning
- Department of Medical Readiness and Healthcare
- Department of Pharmaceutical Management
- Comptroller Office

== Transportation ==
The MAB headquarter office is accessible within walking distance west from Dazhi Station of Taipei Metro.

== See also ==
- Ministry of National Defense (Taiwan)
