= Red Swastika Society =

Chinese voluntary association

- 世界紅卍字會
- Red Swastika

- Red Swastika Society flag
- Formation: 1922; 104 years ago
- Founder: Du Bingyin (杜秉寅), Li Jiabai (李佳白), Qian Nengxun (錢能訓)
- Founded at: Mainland China
- Headquarters: Hong Kong

The Red Swastika Society (simplified Chinese: 世界红卍字会; traditional Chinese: 世界紅卍字會; pinyin: shìjiè hóngwànzìhuì; lit. 'World Red Swastika Society') is a voluntary association similar to the Red Cross Society founded in China in 1922 by Qian Nengxun (錢能訓), Du Bingyin (杜秉寅), and Li Jiabai (李佳白). Together with the organisation's president Li Jianqiu (李建秋), they set up their establishment of the federation in Beijing as the philanthropic branch of the Chinese salvationist religion Guiyidao (皈依道), the "Way of the Return to the One".

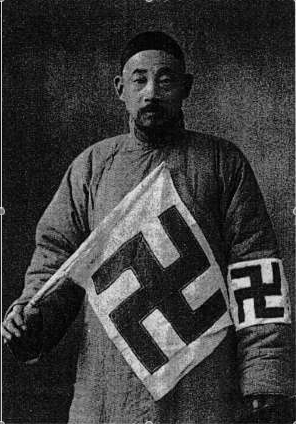
A picture of a Red Swastika Society member circa 1937

== Spiritual symbol ==
The swastika (卍 wàn; "infinity", "all") in Chinese and other cultures is a symbol of the universe, or the manifestation and creativity of God. It was one of a number of new redemptive societies founded in early 20th-century China, that compared to previous redemptive societies that focused on salvation of China, aimed for salvation of the world, drawing upon Western examples such as the Red Cross to build charitable institutions grounded in Asian traditional religions. The use of the symbol in various Asian cultures predates, and is therefore not related to, the symbol's use in Nazi iconography. Reports of its strength during the 1920s and 1930s seem to vary widely, with citations of 30,000 "members" in 1927 to 7–10 million "followers" in 1937.

== Mission ==
Generally, its mission was a broad-based effort of philanthropy and moral education. It ran poorhouses and soup kitchens, as well as modern hospitals and other relief works. It had an explicit internationalist focus, extending relief efforts to Tokyo after earthquakes and also in response to natural disasters in the Soviet Union. In addition, it had offices in Paris, London, and Tokyo and professors of Esperanto within its membership.

== Nanjing Massacre ==
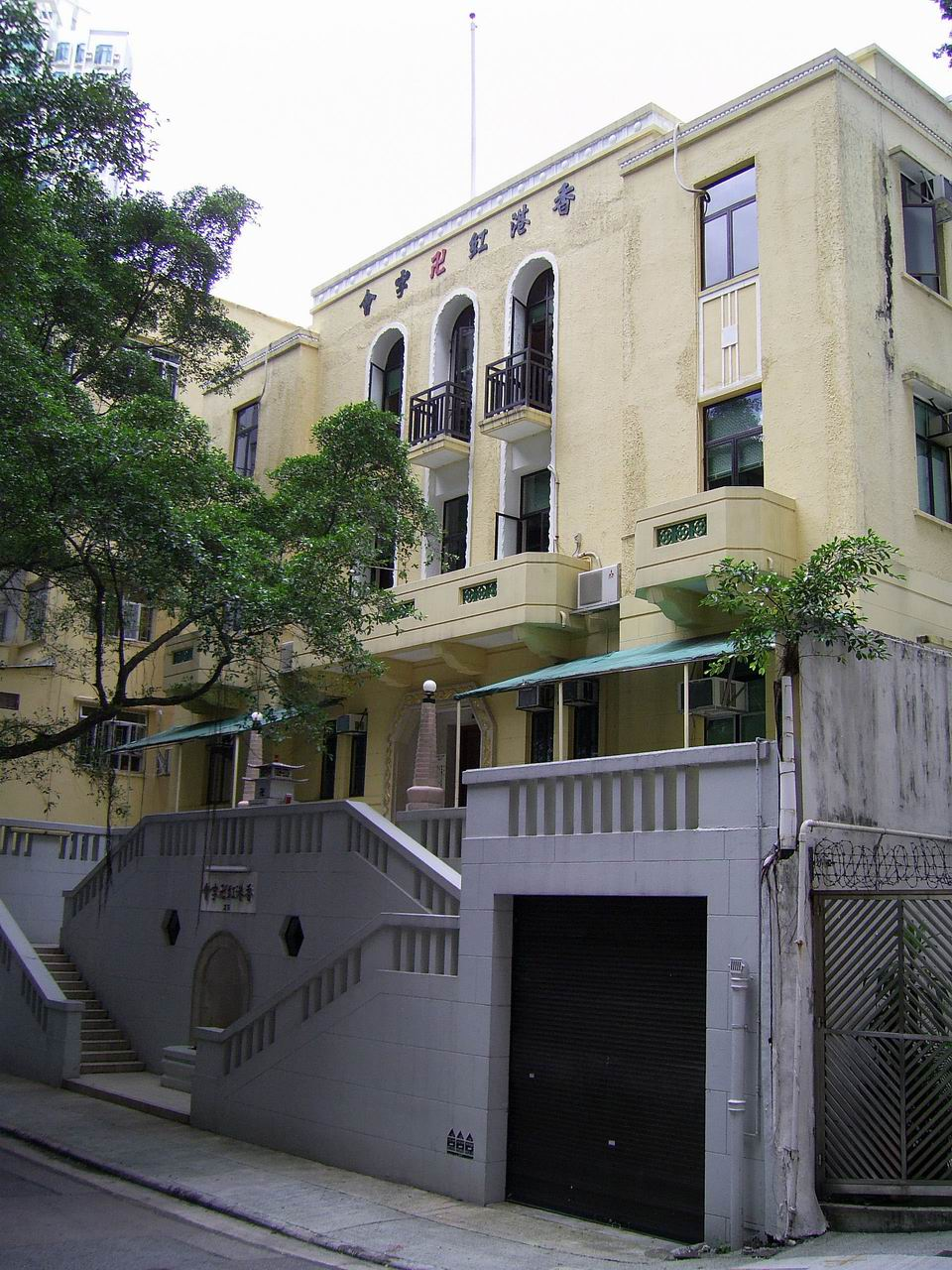
The Red Swastika in Hong Kong, Causeway Bay circa 2008

Perhaps its most documented impact on the history of China was for helping the victims of the Nanjing Massacre. The rampage of the occupying Japanese forces through the city left thousands of bodies in the streets, and the Red Swastika Society stepped in to assist in burials. Records of these activities from the Red Swastika Society have provided important primary resources for research into the scale of the atrocity and the location of mass graves.

== Present day ==
Although it seems to have been suppressed during the Maoist rule in mainland China, the Red Swastika Society continues today as a religious organisation focused on charity. It has branches in areas of the Chinese diaspora, with headquarters in Taiwan. Besides charity work, the Red Swastika runs two schools in Hong Kong (Tuen Mun and Tai Po) and one in Singapore (Red Swastika School).
