= Ministry of National Defense (Taiwan) =

Taiwanese defense ministry

- 中華民國國防部; Zhōnghuá Mínguó Guófángbù (Mandarin)
- Emblem of the Ministry of National Defense

- Seal of the Ministry of National Defense (國防部印)

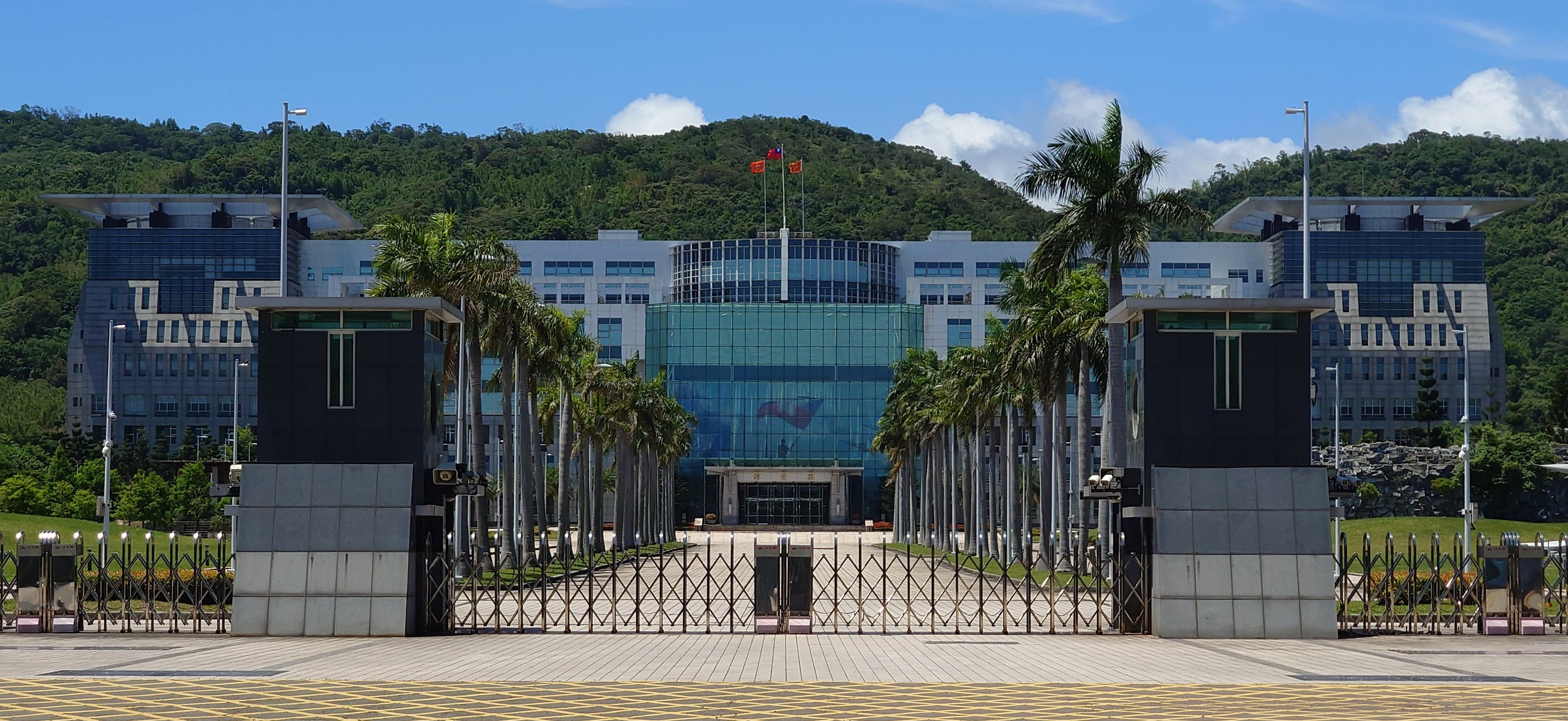
- Headquarters of the Ministry of National Defense

Agency overview
- Formed: 1912; 114 years ago (as Ministry of War); 1946; 80 years ago (as Ministry of National Defence)
- Jurisdiction: Taiwan
- Headquarters: Zhongshan District, Taipei, Taiwan
- Annual budget: US$31.1 billion (2026）
- Minister responsible: Wellington Koo
- Deputy Minister responsible: Hsu Szu-chien
- Website: www.mnd.gov.tw

The Ministry of National Defense (MND; Chinese: 中華民國國防部; pinyin: Zhōnghuá Mínguó Guófángbù) of Taiwan is the government ministry of the Republic of China (ROC), which has been based in Taiwan since its retreat in 1949. It is responsible for all defense and military affairs of Taiwan and surrounding area. The MND has been headed by Minister Wellington Koo since 2024.

== History ==
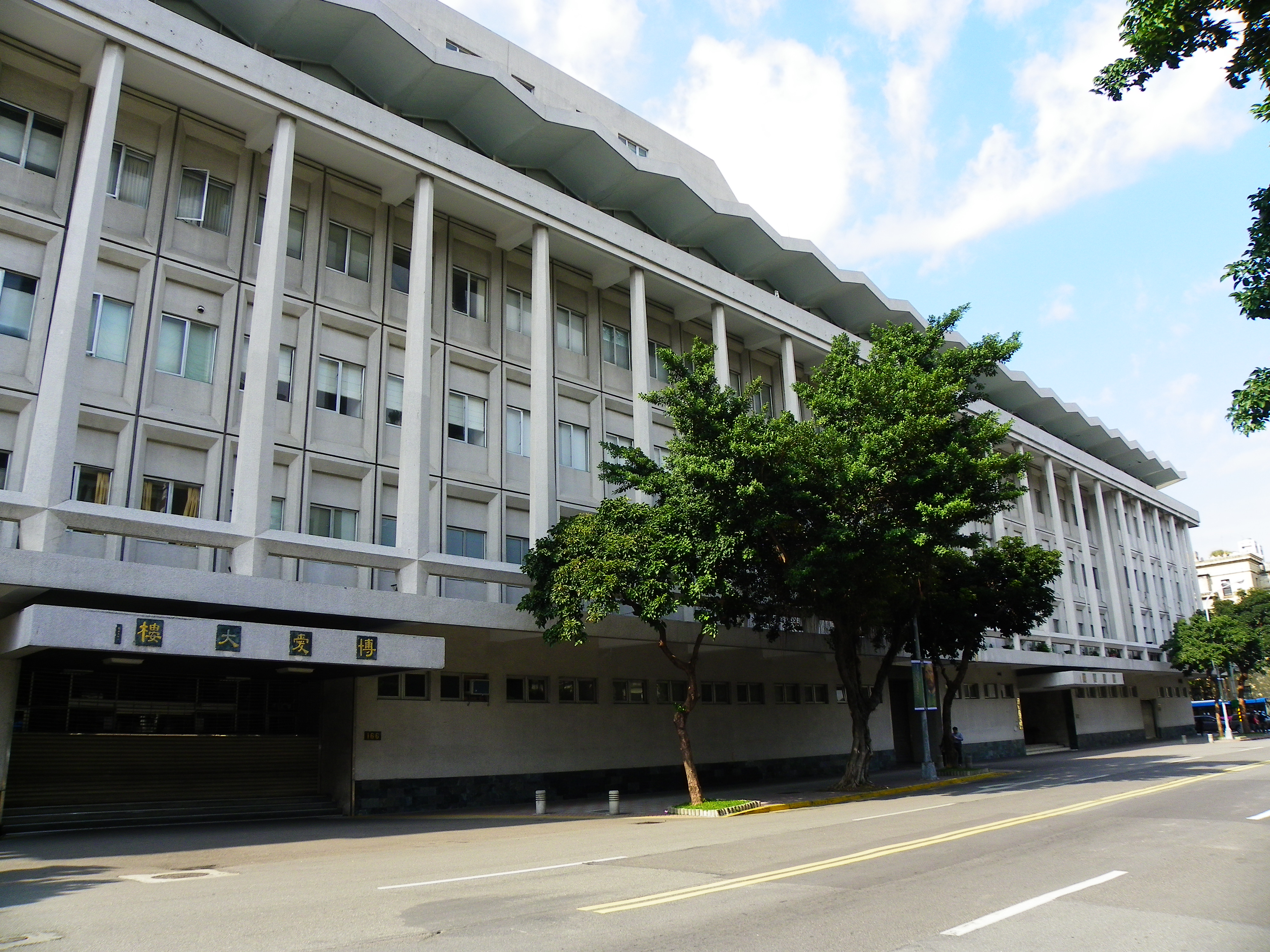
Former headquarters of the Ministry of National Defense

The MND was originally established as Ministry of War in 1912 at the creation of the Republic of China. It established a military occupation operation center in Taipei, Formosa in November 1945, following the Supreme Commander for the Allied Powers Douglas MacArthur's September 2, 1945 General Order No. 1, for the surrender of Japanese troops and auxiliary forces in Formosa and the Pescadores to Generalissimo Chiang Kai-shek. It was changed to the Ministry of National Defense in 1946. Military operation activities in Formosa and the Pescadores were expanded after Japan renounced its title, right, and claim to Formosa and the Pescadores based on the April 28, 1952 Treaty of Peace with Japan. The Law of National Defense and the Organic Law of the ministry were officially promulgated for implementation on 1 March 2002.

On 8 December 2014, the ministry moved out from its building from the previous one at Boai Building in Zhongzheng District to the current one in Dazhi area at Zhongshan District, where it houses the Air Force Command Headquarters, Navy Command Headquarters and Heng Shan Military Command Center. The completion of the building had been delayed for nearly two decades due to the compound original architecture and the bankruptcy of the project's original contractor. The planning for the new building and relocation had been done since 1997. The official ribbon-cutting ceremony was held on 27 December 2014.

== Headquarters ==
The headquarters of the military was originally in eastern Nanjing near Ming Palace. Today it is located in Dazhi area of Zhongshan District in Taipei. The 8-story main building was constructed at a cost of NT$15.8 billion, spreading over 19.5 hectares of area, which houses office buildings, dormitories and other facilities, such as post office, barbershop, sports center, conference hall and sport center to accommodate its 3,000 military personnel stationed there. It also includes several annex buildings around.

The security features of the building include fingerprint and eye scanners that restrict access to certain areas, sensors that can detect vehicles in the unauthorized areas and that may carry explosives and bollards on the compound to block unauthorized vehicles. The compound also has eco-friendly features, such as stone walls, aluminum and low-emission exterior glass panels. The central air conditioning system is provided by ice storage system to reduce peak load electricity demand. The building also has rainwater collecting facilities which can store up to 1,000 tons of water, complete with its waste water treatment and filtering systems.

== Budget ==
In 2016 the annual defense budget for Taiwan was NT$320 billion.

In 2021 the Ministry of National Defense began directly funding defense related research at civilian universities. NT$5 billion (US$147 million) were allocated for the first five years of the program with an initial focus on information security and robotics, artificial intelligence, the internet of things and quantum computing. Previously funding had been allocated through intermediaries with most going to military affiliated research organizations like National Chung-Shan Institute of Science and Technology (NCSIST).

== Organizational structure ==
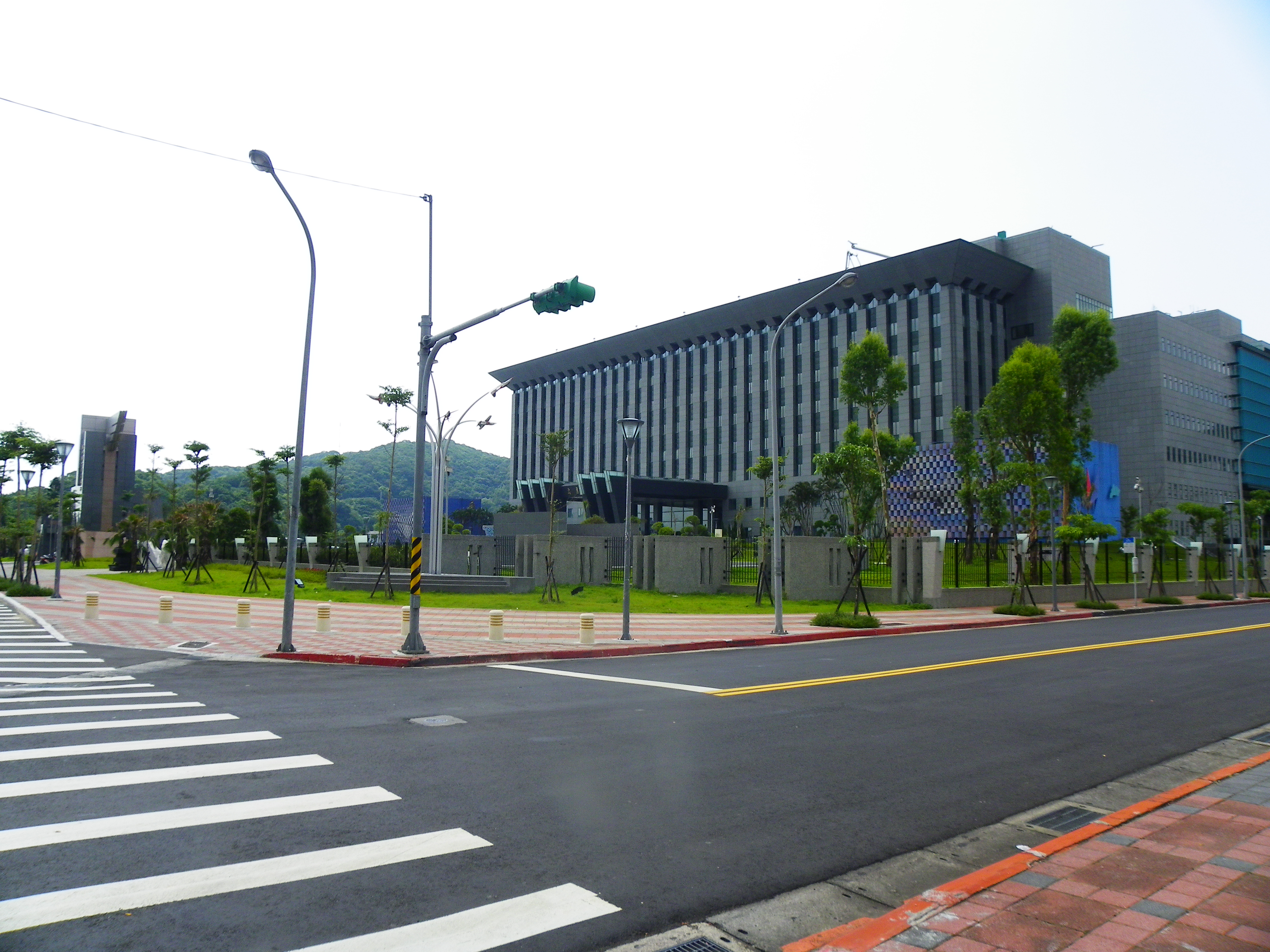
Air Force Command Headquarters

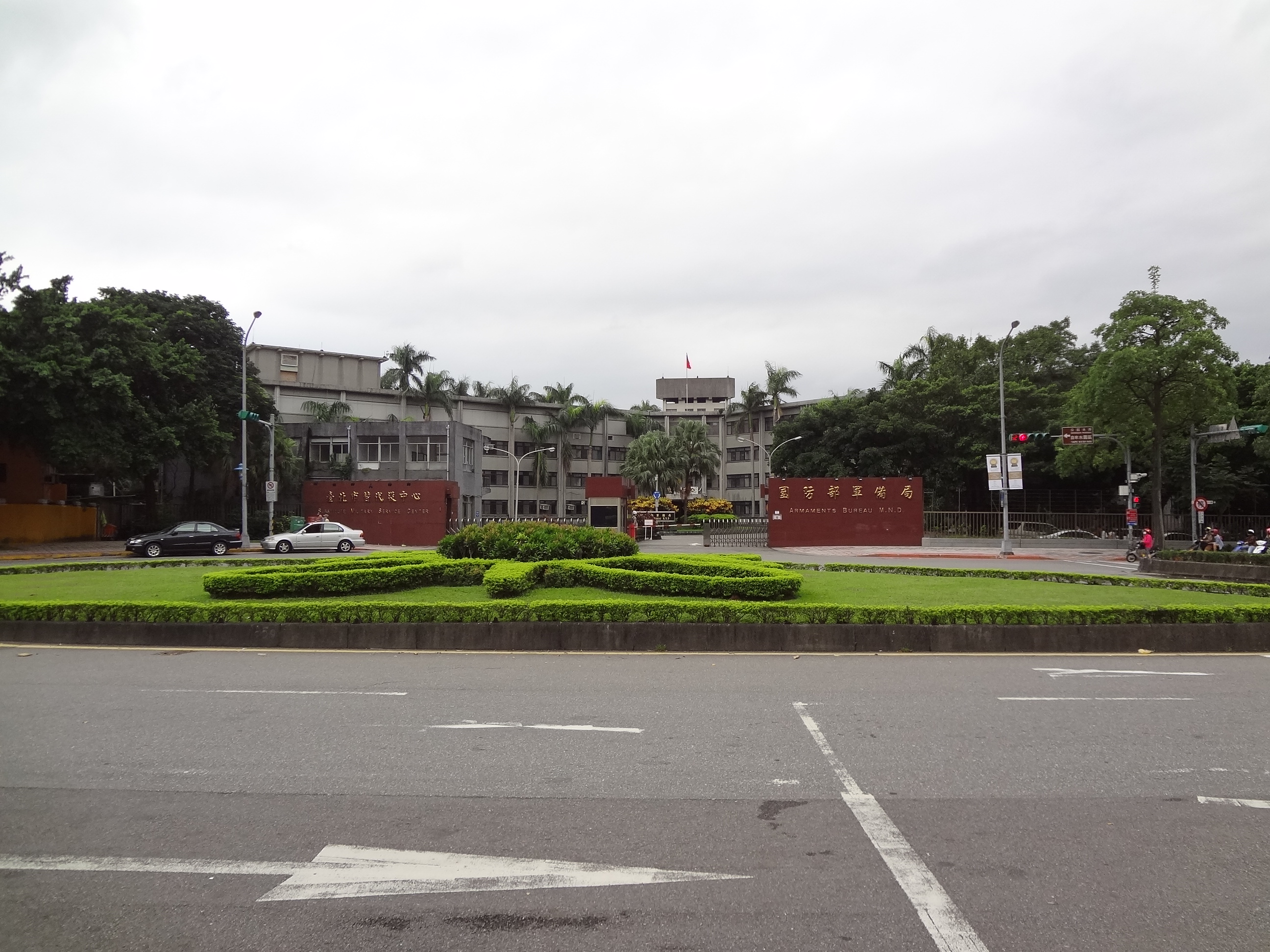
Armaments Bureau

=== Headquarter departments ===
- Department of Strategic Planning (戰略規劃司)
- Department of Resources Planning (資源規劃司)
- Department of Military Justice (法律事務司)
- Department of Integrated Assessment (整合評估司)
- Office of the Inspector General (總督察長室)
- National Defense Procurement Office (國防採購室)
- Administration Office (政務辦公室)
- Personnel Office (人事室)
- Ethics Office (政風室)
- Accounting Office (主計室)

=== Secondary or affiliated authorities ===
- Political Warfare Bureau
- Armaments Bureau
- Comptroller Bureau (主計局)
- Medical Affairs Bureau
- All-Out Defense Mobilization Agency

=== General staff headquarters ===
- Office of the Deputy Chief of the General Staff for Personnel (人事參謀次長室)
- Office of the Deputy Chief of the General Staff for Intelligence (情報參謀次長室)
- Office of the Deputy Chief of the General Staff for Operations and Planning (作戰及計畫參謀次長室)
- Office of the Deputy Chief of the General Staff for Logistics (後勤參謀次長室)
- Office of the Deputy Chief of the General Staff for Communications, Electronics and Information (通信電子資訊參謀次長室)
- Office of the Deputy Chief of the General Staff for Training (訓練參謀次長室)
- Communication Development Office (電訊發展室)
- Military Intelligence Bureau (軍事情報局)

=== Military authorities ===
- Army Command Headquarters (陸軍司令部)
- Navy Command Headquarters (海軍司令部)
- Air Force Command Headquarters (空軍司令部)

=== Military institutions ===
- Armed Forces Reserve Command (後備指揮部)
- Military Police Command (憲兵指揮部)
- Information, Communications and Electronic Force Command (資通電軍指揮部)

=== Affiliated research institutes ===
- National Chung-Shan Institute of Science and Technology (國家中山科學研究院)
- Institute for National Defense and Security Research (國防安全研究院)

=== Military academies ===
- National Defense University
- National Defense Medical Center
- Republic of China Military Academy
- Republic of China Naval Academy
- Republic of China Air Force Academy
- Republic of China Air Force Institute of Technology
- Army Academy R.O.C.
- Chung Cheng Armed Forces Preparatory School

== List of ministers ==
=== War ===
1. Ministers of War during the Republic of China (1912–1928) (歷代陸軍總長)：

| No. | Portrait | Name (born–died) | Term of office | | | Cabinet | Ref. |
| No. | Portrait | Name (born–died) | Took office | Left office | Time in office | Cabinet | Ref. |
|---|---|---|---|---|---|---|---|
| 1 | | Duan Qirui (段祺瑞) (1865–1936) | 13 March 1912 | 5 March 1915 | 2 years, 357 days | | |
| 2 | | Wang Shizhen (王士珍) (1861–1930) | 5 March 1915 | 22 April 1916 | 1 year, 48 days | | |
| 1 | | Duan Qirui (段祺瑞) (1865–1936) | 22 April 1916 | 23 May 1917 | 1 year, 31 days | | |
| – | | Zhang Shiyu (張士鈺) (?–1922) acting | 23 May 1917 | 24 June 1917 | 32 days | | |
| 2 | | Wang Shizhen (王士珍) (1861–1930) | 24 June 1917 | 2 July 1917 | 8 days | | |
| 1 | | Duan Qirui (段祺瑞) (1865–1936) | 15 July 1917 | 19 November 1917 | 127 days | | |
| 2 | | Wang Shizhen (王士珍) (1861–1930) | 19 November 1917 | 23 March 1918 | 124 days | | |
| 3 | | Duan Zhigui (段芝貴) (1869–1925) | 29 March 1918 | 11 January 1919 | 288 days | | |
| 4 | | Jin Yunpeng (靳雲鵬) (1877–1951) | 11 January 1919 | 14 May 1921 | 2 years, 123 days | | |

- Cai Chengxun (蔡成勛): 1921
- Bao Guiqing (鮑貴卿): 1921–1922
- Wu Peifu (吳佩孚): 1922
- Zhang Shaozeng (張紹增): 1922–1923
- Wang Tan (王坦): 1923; 1st time
- Jin Shaozeng (金紹曾)：1923–1924; 2nd time
- Lu Jin (陸錦): 1924
- Li Shucheng (李書城): 1924
- Wu Guangxin (吳光新): 1924–1925
- Jia Deyao (賈德耀): 1925–1926; Anhui clique
- Zhang Jinghui (張景惠): 1926–1927
- He Fenglin (何豐林): 1927–1928

2. Ministers of War during the National Government of the Republic of China (歷代軍政部長)：

| No. | Portrait | Name (born–died) | Term of office | | | Party | Cabinet | Ref. |
| No. | Portrait | Name (born–died) | Took office | Left office | Time in office | Party | Cabinet | Ref. |
|---|---|---|---|---|---|---|---|---|
| 1 | | Feng Yuxiang (馮玉祥) (1882–1948) | 25 October 1928 | 18 November 1930 | 2 years, 24 days | Kuomintang | Tan | |
| 2 | | He Yingqin (何應欽) (1890–1987) | 18 November 1930 | 31 May 1945 | 14 years, 194 days | Kuomintang | Chiang I Sun I Wang; Chiang II; Kung; Chiang III | |
| 3 | | Chen Cheng (陳誠) (1898–1965) | 31 May 1945 | 24 May 1948 | 2 years, 359 days | Kuomintang | Zhang | |

3. Ministers of the Navy during the Republic of China (1912–1928) (歷代海軍總長):

- Liu Guanxiong (劉冠雄): 1912–1916; 1st time
- Cheng Biguang (程璧光): 1916–1917; 1st time
- Sa Zhenbing (薩鎮冰): 1917; 1st time
- Liu Guanxiong (劉冠雄): 1917–1919; 2nd time
- Sa Zhenbing (薩鎮冰): 1919–1921; 2nd time
- Li Dingxin (李鼎新): 1921–1924; 2nd time
- Du Xigui (杜鍚圭): 1924; 1st time
- Lin Jianzhang (林建章): 1924–1925; 1st time
- Du Xigui (杜鍚圭): 1925–1927; 2nd time

4. Ministers of the Navy during the National Government of the Republic of China (歷代海軍部長):

- Yang Shuzhuang (楊樹莊): 1929–1932; Kuomintang
- Chen Shaokuan (陳紹寬): 1932–1938; Kuomintang

5. Chiefs of Staff during the Republic of China (1912–1928) (歷代參謀總長):

- Huang Xing (黄興): 1912; 1st time
- Xu Shaozhen (徐紹楨): 1912; 1st time
- Li Yuanhong (黎元洪): 1912–1915; 1st time
- Feng Guozhang (馮國璋): 1915–1916; 1st time
- Duan Qirui (段祺瑞): 1916; 1st time
- Wang Shizhen (王士珍): 1916–1917; 1st time
- Yin Chang (蔭昌): 1917–1919; 1st time
- Zhang Huaizhi (張懷芝): 1919–1924; 1st time
- Li Liejun (李烈鈞): 1924–1925; 1st time
- Yang Sen (楊森): 1925–1926; 1st time
- Liu Ruxian (劉汝賢): 1926; 1st time
- Liu Xiang (劉湘): 1926–1927; 1st time

6. Chiefs of Staff during the National Government of the Republic of China (歷代參謀總長):

- Li Jishen (李濟深): 1928–1929; Kuomintang
- He Yingqin (何應欽): 1929; Kuomintang
- Zhu Peide (朱培德: 1929–1932; Kuomintang
- Chiang Kai-shek (蔣中正): 1932–1935; Kuomintang
- Cheng Qian (程潛): 1935–1938; Kuomintang
- He Yingqin (何應欽): 1938–1946; Kuomintang

7. Directors of Training (歷代訓練總監部長):

- He Yingqin (何應欽): 1928–1931; Kuomintang
- Li Jishen (李濟深): 1931–1933; Kuomintang
- Zhu Peide (朱培德): 1933–1934; Kuomintang
- Tang Shengzhi (唐生智): 1934–1938; Kuomintang
- Bai Chongxi (白崇禧): 1938–1946; Kuomintang

8. 歷代軍事參議院長：

- Li Zongren (李宗仁): 1928–1929; Kuomintang
- Tang Shengzhi (唐生智): 1929–1931; Kuomintang
- Zhang Jinghui (張景惠): 1931; Kuomintang
- Zhang Yipeng (張翼鵬): 1931–1934; Kuomintang
- Chen Tiaoyuan (陳調元): 1934–1943; Kuomintang
- Li Jishen (李濟深): 1943–1945; Kuomintang
- Long Yun (龍雲): 1945–1946; Kuomintang

== See also ==
- Chief of the General Staff (Republic of China)
- Chinese Republic Ministry of War
- National Revolutionary Army
- Republic of China Armed Forces
  - Republic of China Army
  - Republic of China Navy
    - Republic of China Marine Corps
  - Republic of China Air Force
  - Republic of China Military Police
