= Qian Nengxun =

Chinese politician (1869–1924)

- 钱能训
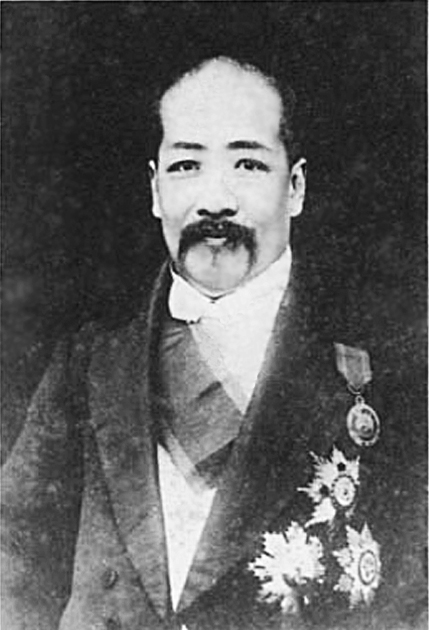

Premier of China
- In office 10 October 1918 – 13 June 1919
- President: Xu Shichang
- Preceded by: Duan Qirui
- Succeeded by: Gong Xinzhan (Acting)
- In office 20 February 1918 – 23 March 1918
- President: Feng Guozhang
- Preceded by: Wang Shizhen
- Succeeded by: Duan Qirui

Personal details
- Born: 1869 Qing China
- Died: 5 June 1924 (aged 54–55) Beijing, China
- Awards: Order of the Precious Brilliant Golden Grain; Order of Wen-Hu

Qian Nengxun (simplified Chinese: 钱能训; traditional Chinese: 錢能訓; pinyin: qián néngxùn, 1869 – June 5, 1924), courtesy name Ganchen (干臣) or Gancheng (干丞) was a Chinese politician from 1918 until his death in 1924. He served as the Premier of China twice during the Warlord Era, in 1918 and 1919 and was the protegee of former president Xu Shichang. In 1922, Qian co-founded the charitable Red Swastika Society.

== Biography ==
Qian Nengxun was born in 1869 in Qing China. In 1898 he passed the imperial examinations as the 18th Jinshi in the second class of the Reform Movement Division, gaining the rank of Shujishi. In 1903, he was changed to a supervisory censor, and successively served as a supervisory censor in Henan and Jiangxi provinces. In the following year, he became Minister of the Patrol Department (later changed to the Ministry of Civil Affairs) under Xu Shichang. In 1907, Xu Shichang became the Governor-General of the Viceroy of the Three Northeast Provinces, Qian followed him to Fengtian to serve as the right counselor of Fengtian Province. In 1909, Xu left the Northeast, and Qian was dismissed from his post.

In 1910, on the recommendation of Xu Shichang, Qian was appointed as the chief envoy and later governor of Shaanxi. During his tenure, Qian hunted down the Tongmenghui revolutionary organisation. During the 1911 Revolution, seeing revolutionary victory inevitable, he attempted suicide and was sent out of the Tong Pass after being treated by the revolutionary army.

After the founding of the Republic of China, Qian was approached by president Yuan Shikai because of his relationship with Xu Shichang. In October 1913 he served as the Deputy Minister of Internal Affairs of Xiong Xiling's cabinet. In 1917, during the Manchu Restoration, he was appointed as the Vice Minister of Agriculture and Industry.

In December 1917 Qian became the Minister of Internal Affairs of Wang Shizhen's cabinet. Resigning in February 1918, he instead acted as the premier. In March 1918 Duan Qirui's cabinet was established for the third time, and Qian was once again appointed as the Minister of internal affairs. In October, during Xu Shichang's tenure as president, he once again acted as the de facto premier. On December 14, the Premiership became official, he organized the cabinet, and concurrently served as the Minister of Internal Affairs in January 1919.

During the tenure of Qian, antagonism between the Anhui and Zhili cliques intensified, making Qian's tenure difficult. In 1919, the May Fourth Movement broke out, further weakening Qian's government, leading to his resignation of premiership in June the same year.

On June 5, 1924, Qian died of illness in his residence in Beijing.

Qian was a member of a spirit writing organization.

Preceded by Wang Shizhen	Premier of China; 1918–1919	Succeeded by Jin Yunpeng
