= Gong Xinzhan =

- 龔心湛
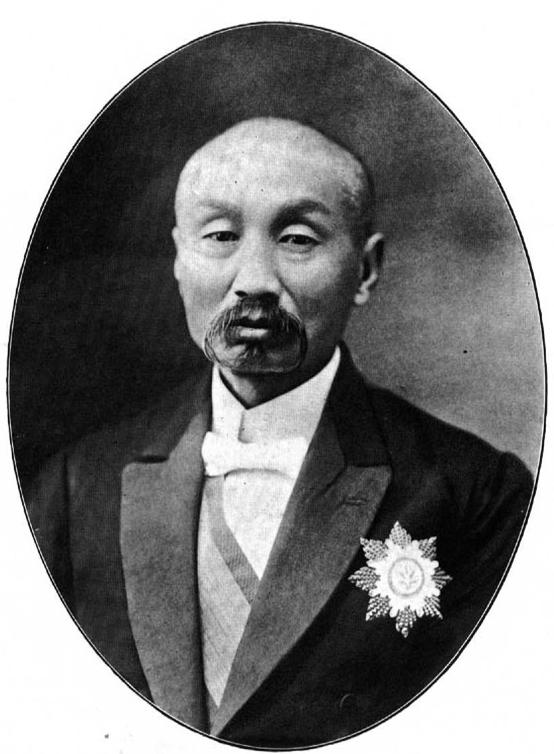

Acting Premier of China
- In office 13 June 1919 – 24 September 1919
- President: Xu Shichang
- Preceded by: Qian Nengxun
- Succeeded by: Jin Yunpeng

Personal details
- Born: 1871 Hefei, Anhui, Qing China
- Died: December 1943 (aged 71–72) Tianjin, Republic of China
- Party: Anhui clique
- Education: Guozijian (Beijing)

Gong Xinzhan (simplified Chinese: 龚心湛; traditional Chinese: 龔心湛; pinyin: Gōng Xīnzhàn; Wade–Giles: Kung Hsin-chan; Hepburn: Gon Shinchin; 1871 – December 1943) was a politician at the end of Qing Dynasty and in the early Republic of China. He was a finance expert in the Beijing Government, and was regarded a member of the Anhui clique. He also temporarily served as acting Prime Minister. His courtesy names were Xianzhou (仙洲) and Xiandan (仙丹).

== Biography ==
Gong Xinzhan was born in Hefei, Anhui. He was a student of the Guozijian Imperial Academy and went to study in Great Britain after graduating. He entered the Imperial Chinese diplomatic service and due to his language ability served as attendant at the Chinese legations in Japan, United States, France, Italy and the Philippines. Later he returned to China, he was appointed to governor of a prefecture (府) and then acting Provincial Judge of Guangdong Province. He also worked for a local official in Yunnan Province.

After the establishment of the Republic of China in 1912, Gong Xinzhan successively held the positions of Chief of the Mint in Wuchang, Manager of the Hankou branch of the Bank of China, and other posts. In 1914, he was appointed to Director of the Financial Agency of Anhui Province. In June 1915, he was promoted to Vice-Minister of Finance in the Beiyang Government, and also held the post of Director of the Salt Affairs Agency. In December, he was appointed Governor of the Border of Rice Lands Affairs Bureau (督辦經界局事務). In April 1916, he was transferred to the Councilor of the National Council (參政院).

In July 1918, Gong Xinzhan was appointed Governor of Anhui Province, but he never actually took office. The next year, he was appointed concurrently Minister of Finance and Governor of the Monetary Bureau and President of the Mint. From June to September 1919, Gong Xinzhan also was interim acting Premier of China. From 1924 to 1925, Gong was head of the Ministry of Internal Affairs. Gong became Minister of the Interior. The next November, he became Minister of Transportation. In April 1926, he resigned his positions. In his later years, Gong Xinzhan moved to Tianjin, and served as director or president of a number of banks and insurance companies, as well as the General Director of the Yaohua Glass Company (耀華玻璃公司). In 1942, he agreed to join the North China Policy Committee (华北政务委员会) of the Reorganized National Government of China led by Wang Jingwei. He died in Tianjin in December 1943.

Gong was a member of the Wushanshe and one of its sub-organizations.

Political offices
Preceded by Qian Nengxun	Premier of China; June 1919–Sept 1919	Succeeded by Jin Yunpeng
