= Chengting T. Wang =

Chinese politician and diplomat

Chengting Thomas Wang
- 王正廷
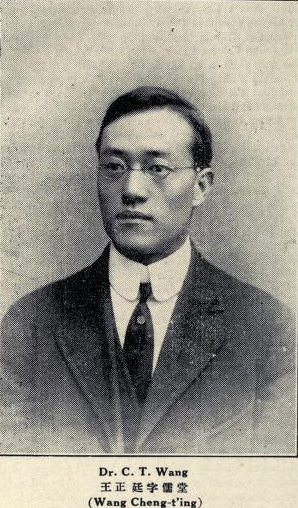

Acting Premier of China
- In office 11 December 1922 – 4 January 1923
- President: Li Yuanhong
- Preceded by: Wang Daxie (acting)
- Succeeded by: Zhang Shaozeng

Personal details
- Born: 7 September 1882 Fenghua, Zhejiang
- Died: May 21, 1961 (aged 78) British Hong Kong
- Education: Peiyang University; University of Michigan; Yale University

Chengting Thomas Wang or C. T. Wang (Chinese: 王正廷; pinyin: Wáng Zhèngtíng; Wade–Giles: Wang^{2} Cheng^{4}-t'ing^{2}, 7 September 1882 – 21 May 1961), also known under the Pinyin spelling Wang Zhengting, was Foreign Minister, Minister of Finance, Minister of Justice and acting Premier in governments of the China in the 1920s.

"Chengting T. Wang" was the preferred form of his name in English.

== Early life ==
Wang was born in Fenghua, Zhejiang, and his father was an Anglican minister just outside Shanghai, where Wang attended mission schools before entering the preparatory school for Peiyang University. After teaching in the Provincial High School in Changsha, Hunan. Wang studied in Tokyo, where he was secretary of the Chinese YMCA, then in 1907, went to the United States to study law at the University of Michigan. He soon transferred to Yale University, graduating in 1910 and being elected to Phi Beta Kappa.

== Life in government ==
Wang returned to Shanghai in June, 1911, and took another position with the YMCA before being recruited to join the new Republican government in Beijing, then in Sun Yat-sen's opposition government in Canton.

He represented the interim Canton government in China's delegation, headed by Lu Zhengxiang, at the Paris Peace Conference, 1919 after World War I. He and Wellington Koo, another US-educated lawyer, played prominent roles in presenting the case for returning Shandong to China and in the decision not to sign the Treaty of Versailles because it stipulated the transfer of German rights in Shandong to Japan. Notwithstanding their competitive positions domestically, Wang and Koo joined forces in staunchly promoting the formation of the League of Nations, jointly authoring a pamphlet on the subject.

Wang was on the constitutional committee for Hunan province, which was the only province to implement a constitution during the 1920s as parts of various province efforts towards self-rule.

Wang served as foreign minister, minister of finance, minister of justice and acting premier for various short periods of time from 1924–1928, before serving as foreign minister until 1931. He also founded a Shanghai brokerage house; was chairman or board member of mining, cotton milling, and railroad companies; and was Chairman of the Far Eastern Olympics. As foreign minister, Wang negotiated a settlement with Japan over the Jinan Incident of 1928; with Soviet Russia over the Chinese Eastern Railway in Manchuria; treaties restoring Chinese territory in British Weihaiwei and French Tonkin; and tariff autonomy or commercial agreements with more than a dozen countries, including Japan.

== Sports ==
Wang was a keen athlete who fervently believed in sports as a vehicle for national development. He represented China at the Far Eastern Championship Games in 1913 and was later to be the first Chinese member of the International Olympic Committee.

== Later life ==
In spite of his successes in nationalist diplomacy, after the Mukden Incident of 1931 in which Japan seized control of China's Northeast provinces, student protestors targeted Wang for China's ineffective response. Wang was attacked and hospitalized, and withdrew from public office for a time. Wang was Ambassador to the United States from 1936 to 1938. He served in various minor government and party capacities during the war, but in 1949 stayed in Hong Kong rather than go to Taiwan with Chiang Kai-shek's government.

Political offices
Preceded by Wang Daxie	Premier of China; 1922–1923	Succeeded by Zhang Shaozeng
