= Wang Shizhen (Beiyang government) =

Chinese politician and general (1861–1930)

- 王士珍
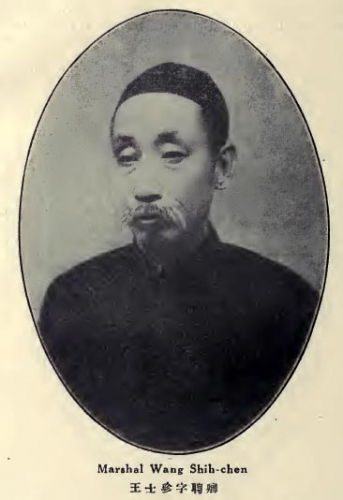

Premier of China
- In office 30 November 1917 – 23 March 1918
- President: Feng Guozhang
- Preceded by: Wang Daxie
- Succeeded by: Qian Nengxun

Minister of War
- In office August 1915 – April 1916
- Preceded by: Duan Qirui
- Succeeded by: Duan Qirui
- In office June – July 1917
- Preceded by: Wang Shizhen
- Succeeded by: Lei Zhenchun
- In office November – December 1917
- Preceded by: Duan Qirui
- Succeeded by: Duan Zhigui

Minister of General Staff
- In office 1 July – 12 July 1917
- Monarch: Xuantong Emperor
- Prime Minister: Zhang Xun
- Deputy: Jiang Zuobin
- Preceded by: Position restored (Manchu Restoration)
- Succeeded by: Position abolished

Minister of the Army
- In office 1911–1912
- Monarch: Xuantong Emperor
- Prime Minister: Yuan Shikai
- Deputy: Tian Wenlie
- Preceded by: Yinchang
- Succeeded by: Position abolished (1911 Revolution)

Personal details
- Born: 1861 Zhengding, North Zhili, Qing China
- Died: 1 June 1930 (aged 68–69) Beiping, Republic of China

Military service
- Allegiance: Qing Dynasty (Beiyang government) Republic of China

Wang Shizhen (Chinese: 王士珍; pinyin: Wáng Shìzhēn; 1861–1930), courtesy name Pinqing (聘卿), was a Chinese general and politician of the Republic of China.

== Biography ==
Born on July 14, in a family of scholars, he was adopted by his eldest uncle, Rusong, when he was young. However, both his uncle Rusong and his father, Rubai, died early. He depended on his mother for life. Due to his poor family, he practiced archery and horse riding in his early years. In 1878 he enrolled in the Zhengding Zhenbiao Cadet Corps. After that, he followed Ye Zhichao to Shanhaiguan. In 1885, he enrolled in Tianjin Military Academy and graduated with excellent grades three years later. After that, he returned to Shanhaiguan to supervise the school of the artillery corps.

In 1894, Wang Shizhen accompanied Zhili Admiral Ye Zhichao to Korea, During the Sino-Japanese War, Wang Shizhen was at the forefront of the Defense of Pyongyang. Wang Shizhen was injured in the battle and one of his fingers was blown off. After the war, he retreated with the defeated army. After returning to China, Wang Shizhen still commanded the Yutai artillery team and stationed at Shanhaiguan. After the signing of the Treaty of Shimonoseki, Wang Shizhen moved to Lutai with the new Zhili Admiral Nie Shicheng,

In December 1895, Yuan Shikai began to train troops in Xiaozhan, Tianjin. Wang Shizhen served as the director of the training camp office and the chief instructor of the military training hall. He also served as the director of the engineering department and the supervisor of the German language hall of the engineers. After Yuan Shikai was appointed as the governor of Shandong, Wang Shizhen was the military advisor of the whole province. He also went to Japan to inspect military training.

In 1900, Wang Shizhen participated in suppressing the Boxer Rebellion, In the same year, the Yellow River burst its banks in Shandong Province, and he led an engineering corps to build embankments, alleviating the disaster.

In the spring of 1902, the Beiyang Military and Political Department was established in Baoding, and Wang Shizhen was appointed as the chief counselor. When the Beiyang regular army was organized, Wang Shizhen was appointed as the commander of the left wing. After that, he served successively as the chief envoy of the Military Science Department, the chief envoy of the Military and Political Department, the commander of the 2nd and 6th Beiyang Army. During this period, he contributed to the training and regular preparation of the Beiyang regular army. In the winter of 1906, Wang Shizhen was appointed as the right assistant minister of the newly established Army Department. The following year, he served as the governor of Jiangbei and concurrently in charge of salt and water transport affairs.

=== Beiyang dignitaries ===
In October 1911, the Wuchang Uprising broke out. Yuan Shikai made a comeback and became the prime minister, while Wang Shizhen became the minister of the Army. Wang Shizhen was very loyal to the Qing Dynasty, and he retired immediately after the demise of the Qing Dynasty,

In 1914, Wang Shizhen was awarded the title of Army General and joined the Beiyang Government, In May, he served as the Office of the Commander-in-Chief of the Army and Navy and the Director of the Model Regiment Preparation Office. In August 1915, he succeeded Duan Qirui as the chief of the Army. On April 23, 1916, he was appointed Chief of the General Staff, and he remained in office after Yuan Shikai's death on June 6.

In the dispute between the government and the parliament, Wang Shizhen supported Li Yuanhong and opposed the declaration of war on Germany, On May 23, 1917, Li dismissed Duan Qirui from the post of prime minister. On the same day, Wang Shizhen was appointed as the temporary commander-in-chief of the Beijing-Tianjin area. After Li Jingxi's cabinet was established, he served as the chief of the Army and chief of the General Staff.

In July, Zhang Xun led the imperial guards into Beijing under the pretense of mediating the dispute between the government and the parliament. He took the opportunity to restore the Xuantong Emperor of the former Qing Dynasty, which was the imperial guards restoration. Wang Shizhen participated in it and served as the minister of state affairs and the Minister of the General Staff. After the restoration failed, Wang Shizhen returned to his hometown and lived in seclusion. Later, he returned to Beijing and served as the chief of staff of Duan Qirui on the grounds of his contribution to maintaining order in Beijing.

Duan Qirui's Anhui clique and Feng Guozhang 's Zhili clique had a dispute over whether the southern government (the Protection of the Constitution Army Government) should implement "military unification" (the Anhui clique advocated) or "peaceful unification" (the Zhili clique advocated). Due to the defeat in the Hunan-Southern War, Duan resigned as Premier on November 22. After many twists and turns, on November 30, Feng Guozhang appointed Wang Shizhen as Acting Prime Minister to help promote the North-South peace talks and appease the pro-war faction. However, things did not go as planned. On February 20, 1918, Wang resigned due to illness. Feng Guozhang did not allow him to leave, but only gave him leave to recuperate. The minister of the interior Qian Nengxun temporarily served as the acting prime minister, On March 23, Wang Shizhen was able to officially resign because Duan Qirui was reinstated as prime minister.

=== Later life ===
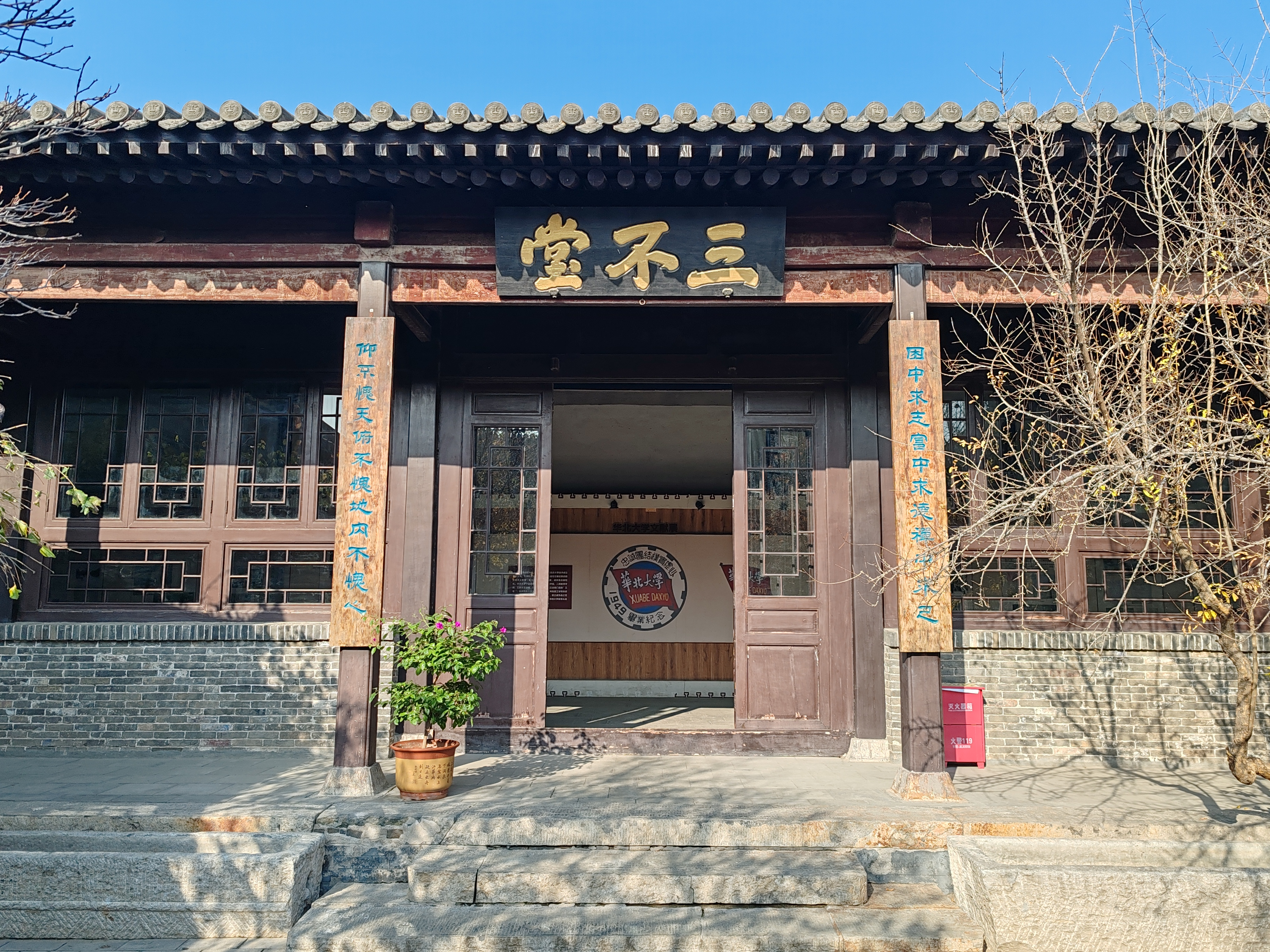
Home of Wang Shizhen in Zhengding County

In December 1920, Wang Shizhen was appointed as the inspector of Jiangsu, Anhui and Gan provinces, and resigned in early January of the following year. In January 1922, he was awarded the title of "Admiral of Virtue and Power" by President Xu Shichang, In February 1925, he served as a member of the Post-war Conference and chairman of the Military Arrangement Committee.

In his later years, Wang Shizhen retired from the military and political front. As the chairman of the Beijing Public Security Association, he mediated between the northern warlords, maintained Beijing's public security, and promoted charity. Wang Shizhen's activities made a great contribution to Beijing's escape from war.

On July 1, 1930, he died in Beijing at the age of 70 (68 years old). His life story is recorded in the "Biography of the Virtuous General Zhengding Prince" written by Jinshi Shang Binghe.

== Family ==
His grandfather, Wang Lu'an, was a scholar who was proficient in medicine and martial arts, and was known as a "scholar who loves war". His father was Wang Rubai, and his eldest uncle was Wang Rusong.

Military offices
Preceded by Yinchang	Minister of the Army of the Great Qing; 1911–1912	Succeeded by Abolished
Preceded by Duan Qirui	Minister of War; 1915–1916	Succeeded by Duan Qirui
Preceded by Wang Shizhen	Minister of War; 1917	Succeeded by Lei Zhenchun
Preceded by Duan Qirui	Minister of War; 1917	Succeeded by Duan Zhigui
Preceded by Wang Daxie	Premier of China; 1917–1918	Succeeded by Qian Nengxun
