= Wang Daxie =

Chinese politician

- 汪大燮
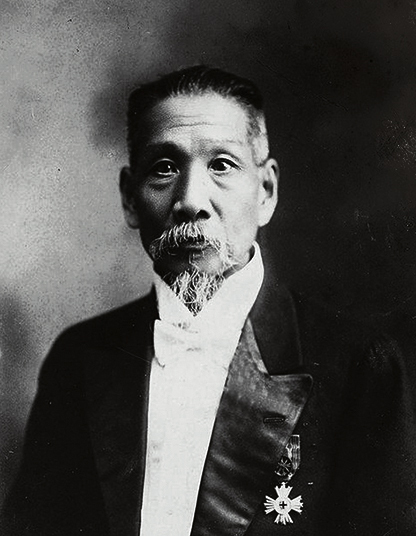

Premier of China
- In office 29 November 1922 – 11 December 1922
- President: Li Yuanhong
- Preceded by: Wang Chonghui
- Succeeded by: Wang Zhengting
- In office 22 November 1917 – 30 November 1917; Acting
- President: Feng Guozhang
- Preceded by: Duan Qirui
- Succeeded by: Wang Shizhen

Personal details
- Born: 1860
- Died: 1929 (aged 68–69)
- Awards: Order of the Rising Sun; Order of Saint Louis

Wang Daxie (Chinese: 汪大燮; 1860–1929) was a Chinese politician who twice served as Premier of China, including in 1922, when he served from November 29 to December 11, at which time Wang Zhengting took over.

Preceded by Duan Qirui	Premier of China; 1917	Succeeded by Wang Shizhen
Preceded by Wang Chonghui	Premier of China; 1922	Succeeded by Wang Zhengting
