= Jin Yunpeng =

Chinese general and politician

- 靳雲鵬
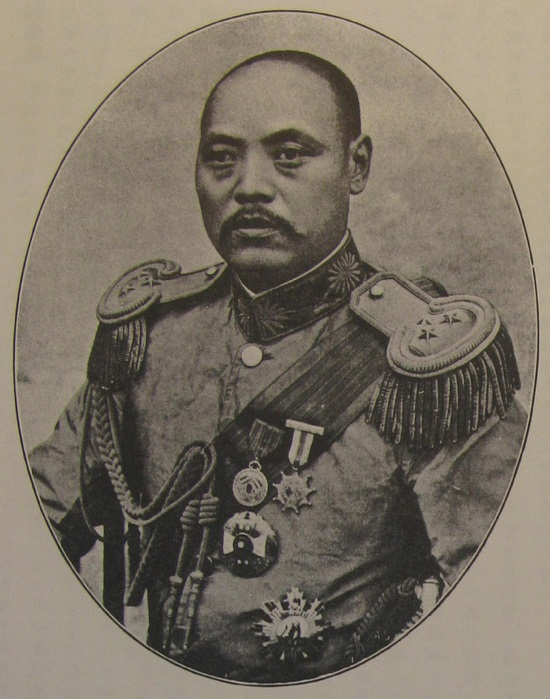

Premier of China
- In office 9 August 1920 – 17 December 1921
- President: Xu Shichang
- Preceded by: Sa Zhenbing
- Succeeded by: Yan Huiqing (acting)
- In office 24 September 1919 – 14 May 1920
- President: Xu Shichang
- Preceded by: Gong Xinzhan
- Succeeded by: Sa Zhenbing

Minister of War
- In office 1919–1920
- Preceded by: Duan Zhigui
- Succeeded by: Luo Kaibang (Acting)
- In office 1920–1921
- Preceded by: Luo Kaibang
- Succeeded by: Cai Chengxun

Personal details
- Born: 1877 Hefei, Anhui, Qing Dynasty
- Died: January 30, 1951 (aged 73–74) Tianjin, China
- Political party: Jiwei Club
- Awards: Order of Wen-Hu; Order of Rank and Merit; Order of the Golden Grain; Order of the Rising Sun; Order of the Sacred Treasure

Military service
- Allegiance: Qing Dynasty (Beiyang government) Republic of China; Empire of China
- Rank: General

Jin Yunpeng (Chinese: 靳云鹏; pinyin: Jìn Yúnpéng; Wade–Giles: Chin Yun-peng); IPA: [t͡ɕìn ýnpʰə́ŋ]; 1877 – 30 January 1951) was a Chinese general and politician of the Warlord Era of the Republic of China. He served as both Minister of War and then Premier of China several times.

His ascent to the Premiership was supported and engineered by Cao Kun and Zhang Zuolin, as he was the leader of an Anfu Club faction rival to Xu Shichang. He promised several cabinet positions to the Anfu Club but went back on his word after he won. A political crisis began in February 1920 when Zhao Ti, the military governor of Henan nominally allied with the Anhui Clique but neutral with the Zhili Clique, was attempted to be replaced with Wu Guangxin, a relative of Duan Qirui. Zhao responded by allying with Wu Peifu and Zhang Zuolin's alliance. Jin attempted to resign over the appointment, but was dissuaded. A rift with the Anfu Club had formed, which led to an effort to remove him. However, Jin's position was relatively secure as he had the support of the Zhili and Fengtian Cliques. When Parliament opened in March, Jin reformed a parliamentary group to oppose the Anfu Club, getting the membership of about 100 MPs. Supporters came from members of the moribund Communications Clique, as well as the Research Clique, and other opposition MPs. His position was enhanced by mass-nonattendance, with only 202 House members attending a sitting on an occasion.

During his first tenure as Premier, his government was plagued with financial woes; as such, he prepared to resign in May 1920. Instead, the President, Xu Shichang, allowed him to go on temporary holiday; this holiday quickly turned permanent with the appointment of Sa Zhenbing as Jin's successor the next day.

In December 1921, having been made Premier once again, he resigned again; this time, he was replaced with Liang Shiyi.

In 1927, he attempted to reorganize the cabinet of China, but was blocked from doing so.

Government offices
| Preceded by Gong Xinzhan | Premier of China; 1919–1920 | Succeeded by Sa Zhenbing |
| Preceded by Duan Zhigui | Minister of War; 1919–1920 | Succeeded by Luo Kaibang (acting) |
| Preceded by Luo Kaibang | Minister of War; 1920-1921 | Succeeded by Cai Chengxun |
| Preceded by Sa Zhenbing | Premier of China; 1920–1921 | Succeeded by Yan Huiqing |
