= Zhang Shaozeng =

Chinese general

- 張紹曾
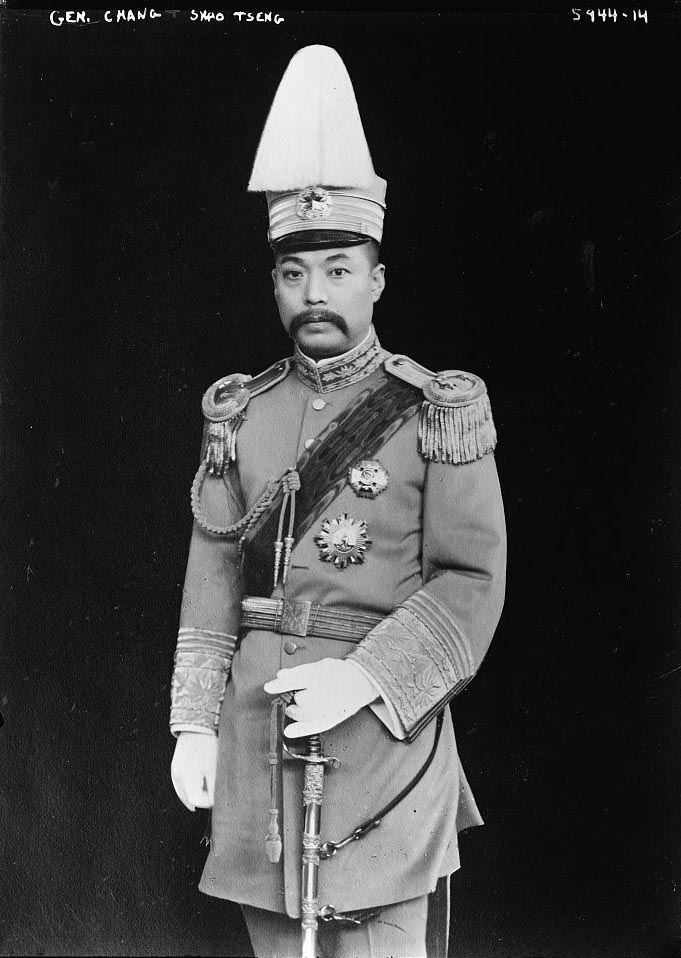

Premier of China
- In office 4 January 1923 – 13 June 1923
- President: Li Yuanhong; Gao Lingwei (acting)
- Preceded by: Wang Zhengting (acting)
- Succeeded by: Gao Lingwei (acting)

Personal details
- Born: 9 October 1879 Zhili, Empire of China
- Died: 21 March 1928 (aged 48) Tianjin, Republic of China
- Manner of death: Assassination
- Awards: Order of Rank and Merit; Order of Wen-Hu

Military service
- Allegiance: Qing Dynasty (Beiyang government) Republic of China

Zhang Shaozeng (Chinese: 張紹曾; Wade-Giles Chang Shao-ts'eng; 9 October 1879 – 21 March 1928) was a Beiyang Army general in charge of the 20th Division.

== Biography ==
He was born in Zhili province and graduated from a Japanese military academy in 1901. He was a known radical who advocated constitutional monarchy and supported Wu Luzhen's mutiny during the Xinhai Revolution. He became the Progressive Party boss of Tianjin.

In 1912, he secured the loyalty of the Inner Mongolian tribes to Yuan Shikai. He broke with Yuan during the National Protection War and was one of the first to fight against Zhang Xun's attempt to restore the Qing dynasty in 1917.

He became affiliated with Cao Kun's Zhili clique and ruled Rehe. He and Wu Peifu advocated the return of the original National Assembly. He served as Li Yuanhong's premier in 1923. He opposed Cao and Wu's plan to invade Guangdong to defeat Sun Yatsen's rival government, preferring to negotiate unification. His tenure as premier in the Beiyang government was marked by greed and self-glorification and he was forced to flee to the British legation in Tianjin after his resignation.

In 1928, he was assassinated by Zhang Zuolin after he was found to have contacts with the Guominjun and Kuomintang.

Political offices
Preceded by Wang Zhengting	Premier of China; 1923	Succeeded by Gao Lingwei
