= Advisory Council (Qing dynasty) =

Pre-parliamentary body in China

Advisory Council 資政院
- Flag of the Qing Empire

Type
- Type: Unicameral

History
- Founded: 6 November 1906
- Disbanded: 12 February 1912
- Succeeded by: Provisional Senate

Leadership
- President: Xu Dinglin since 26 January 1912
- Vice President: Dashou since 30 October 1911
- Secretary General: Jin Bangping since 3 October 1910

Structure
- Seats: 200
- Political groups: Election result: Constitutionalists (116); Revolutionaries (8); Independents (72); Vacant (4)
- Length of term: 3 years

Elections
- Voting system: Indirect elections by provincial assemblies; Appointed by Emperor
- Last election: October 1909

Meeting place
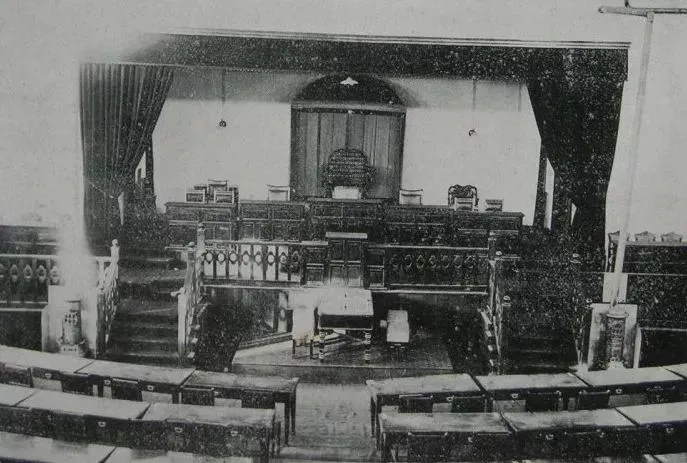
- Advisory Council Building, Beijing

Constitution
- Principles of the Constitution (1908–12); Nineteen Articles (1911–12)

Rules
- Charter of Advisory Council

Advisory Council
- Traditional Chinese: 資政院
- Simplified Chinese: 资政院
Transcriptions
Standard Mandarin
- Hanyu Pinyin: Zī Zhèng Yuàn
- Wade–Giles: Tzu1 Cheng4 Yüan4

The Advisory Council (Chinese: 資政院), also known as the Government Advisory Council, Political Advisory Council, or Political Advisory Board, was a preparatory body for the parliament established in 1910. It was part of the New Policies in the late Qing dynasty, of which the Qing court was moving toward the implementation of a constitution. In September 1907, the Guangxu Emperor promulgated a decree on the setting up of the Advisory Council, following by the provincial Consultative Bureaus in October.

The Advisory Council was established on 6 November 1906, and formally opened on 10 October 1910, after the first parliamentary election in last October. The council was dissolved on 12 February 1912 along with the end of the Qing dynasty, and was replaced by the Provisional Senate of the Republic of China.

== History ==
After the Boxer Protocol was signed in 1901, the Qing court returned to its capital of Beijing eager to reform the realm's governance. In around August 1906, the Guangxu Emperor declared the start of preparative constitutionalism after the study by the Constitutionalism Commission on foreign politics. Two months later, Yikuang, Prince Qing, recommended forming an Advisory Council to prepare for the institution of a parliament. On 6 November 1906, the Emperor issued an edict to revamp the governmental institutions, including the establishment of Advisory Council.

On 20 September 1907, the Emperor appointed Pulun and Sun Jialun as joint Presidents of the council, and delegated to them the writing of its charter. In August 1908, the electoral system of the Council and the Provincial Assemblies were approved and governors of provinces were asked to hold relevant elections within a year. Half of the Council members were elected by members of the Assemblies, while the other half were appointed by the imperial court.

The Council and the Commission further jointly agreed to a nine-year plan for installing constitutionalism. Provincial Assemblies were formed in 1908, with elections of the Assemblies and the Council to be held a year later. The council was to be convened and formally opened in 1910. The constitution of the state, Parliamentary Law, Parliamentary Election Law, and election of the bicameral members were expected in 1916. By then constitutional monarchy would have formally replaced absolute monarchy.

The elections of the Council and Provincial Assemblies held as laid down in the plan. The bicameral parliament, however, did not come into existence as Qing dynasty was overthrown and Emperor Puyi forced to abdicate in 1912.

== Session ==
The Council convened for the first time on 3 October 1910, with the President declaring it as "the unprecedented grand ceremony" in the Chinese history. All 196 members of the council were divided evenly in 6 divisions, followed by election of division head (股長) and director (理事).

The second meeting marked the state opening of the council, attending by the regent and virtually all ministers of the court. Attendants first kowtowed to the throne. The regent then announced the edict and addressed the council. The Council agreed the President and the Vice President to present a humble address to thank His Majesty on behalf of the members. The meeting subsequently ended.

A total of 42 meetings were held, 9 of which was after the extension of the council's session.

On 18 December, the Council presented humble address (palace memorial) to the court over forming cabinet as responsibilities of Grand Council were unclear, which the court denounced as "interference by councillors" and insisted the court shall decide on matters of such. On 30 December, the Council presented another address to urge ending the Manchu hairstyle and clothing.

According to the records of proceedings, the council was closed on 11 January 1911 without the attendance of the regent. The edict was announced and the President kowtowed to the throne, marking the end of the first session of the council.

List of meetings in the first session with excerpted part of issues discussed:
1. 23 September 1910, preparatory meeting and election of division heads and directors.
2. 3 October 1910, state opening of the Council.
3. 4 October 1910
4. 6 October 1910
5. 7 October 1910
6. 14 October 1910
7. 17 October 1910
8. 19 October 1910
9. 22 October 1910, adopted Motion on Petition for Expeditious Establishment of Parliament (陳情速開國會議案) with unanimous support.
10. 26 October 1910
11. 28 October 1910
12. 31 October 1910
13. 3 November 1910
14. 7 November 1910
15. 9 November 1910, meeting ended without agendum proceeded as Grand Councillors did not attend questioning session over not penalising Governor of Hunan for bypassing provincial assembly.
16. 12 November 1910
17. 15 November 1910
18. 17 November 1910
19. 18 November 1910
20. 22 November 1910, agreed to draft a palace memorial on impeaching Grand Councillors for violating separation of powers after resolutions of the Council vetted by executive departments.
21. 25 November 1910, impeachment attempt ended after agreed to draft another palace memorial on establishing cabinet.
22. 30 November 1910
23. 2 December 1910
24. 10 December 1910, adopted Palace Memorial Draft on Demarcation of Responsibilities of Privy Councillors and Expeditious Establishment of Responsible Cabinet (明定樞臣責任並速設責任內閣具奏案折稿) with 129 ayes out of 151 members.
25. 13 December 1910
26. 15 December 1910, adopted Motion on Shaving hair and Changing Costume (剪髮易服議案) with 101 ayes, 27 noes, and 6 invalid ballots; division marred by irregularities after a ballot of an absent member was cast.
27. 19 December 1910, agreed to draft another palace memorial on demarcation of responsibilities of Grand Councillors (synonym of Privy Councillors) with 102 ayes out of around 127 members; discussed requesting the palace to dissolve the Council after earlier Memorial was rejected by regent Tsai Feng.
28. 21 December 1910, agreed to amend the drafted palace memorial over Grand Councillors with 86 ayes out of 127 members after the original draft defeated with only 63 ayes.
29. 24 December 1910, adopted Palace Memorial Draft on Expeditious Establishment of Responsible Cabinet (速設責任內閣具奏案折稿) with 86 ayes out of around 142 members.
30. 26 December 1910, revoked decision on presenting Palace Memorial to the Emperor over establishing cabinet with 85 ayes out of around 129 members after the court directed the Constitutionalism Commission to formulate structure of the cabinet; discussed the repeal of Company Law over alleged embezzlement in Sichuan Railway which would evolve into Railway Protection Movement.
31. 28 December 1910, agreed to draft another palace memorial over impeachment of Grand Councillors without opposition.
32. 29 December 1910, adopted palace memorial draft on extending meeting session for 10 days after 1 January 1911; meeting adjourned after one member short of two-third quorum.
33. 30 December 1910, adopted written statement draft to the Constitutionalism Commission over cabinet set-up, palace memorial draft over impeachment with 88 ayes out of ~132 members, palace memorial draft over Sichuan Railway.
34. 3 January 1911, agreed to draft the final palace memorial to explain the role of the Council after the palace memorial was ignored without reply from the Emperor.
35. 4 January 1911, agreed to recommend the Ministry of Civil Affairs to ban the newspaper which insulted members of the Council as "homeless dog".
36. 5 January 1911, adopted the final part of the budget.
37. 6 January 1911
38. 7 January 1911
39. 8 January 1911
40. 9 January 1911, meeting started late and adjourned as quorum not met.
41. 10 January 1911, final day of meeting, adopted amendments to Assembly and Association Law including repealing restraints on size of assembly, which would encourage the emergency of political parties in the late Qing.
42. 11 January 1911, closing of the Council.

However, the Council continued deliberation. On 25 January 1911, part of the new criminal code was promulgated after adoption by the council. Two days later, the standardised treasury regulation was adopted by the council, along with the 1911 (Xuantong Year 2) budget on the next day. During the Railway Protection protest, the Council passed resolution against government's nationalisation plan, which was in turn rejected.

The second session of the Council started on 22 October 1911, days after outbreak of 1911 revolution. The Council recommended sacking of Sheng Xuanhuai as Minister of Mail for "violating rights, breaking laws, deceiving the Emperor", and calling him as the one "damaging the empire the most", which was agreed by the Emperor. Eight days later, the Council called for replacing the cabinet of Princes and to be completely responsible with non-royals as ministers of state, which was agreed by the court. On 3 November, Nineteen Articles were announced by the court after the Council voiced support for constitutional monarchy. The Charter of the council was amended on 20 November. On 27 October, upon recommendation from the council, the court finally repealed ban on Han hairstyle and costume and replaced lunar calendar with solar calendar.

One of the last acts of the council was the election of Yuan Shikai as the Prime Minister. The council was dissolved upon the end of the Qing dynasty.

== Power ==
According to the Charter of the Council amended on 3 July 1911 –

Article 14: Advisory Council shall decide on matters of –

1. Financial budgets on income and expenditure of the state;
2. Final accounts on income and expenditure of the state;
3. Taxation and public debt;
4. Legislations and amendments thereof, except constitution; and
5. Other issues upon directives by extraordinary edicts.

Article 15: Motions under subsection 1 to 4 of the aforesaid article shall be drafted and presented by cabinet ministers, and submit to the Council at meetings. Advisory Council, however, can draft and present motions at its initiative for matters under subsection 3 and subsection 4.

Article 16: Resolutions on matters particularised in Article 14 by the Advisory Council shall be presented by President or Vice President upon consultation with cabinet ministers for decisions by the Emperor.

== Members ==
Some members resigned during the session and the vacancies were filled according to the precedence list.

List of senior officials of the Advisory Council
Position	Member	Portrait	Term start	Term end
President	Pulun		20 September 1907	22 March 1911
President	Sun Jianai		20 September 1907	30 November 1909
President	Shixu		22 March 1911	30 October 1911
President	Li Jiaju		30 October 1911	26 January 1912
President	Xu Dinglin		26 January 1912	12 February 1912
Vice President	Shen Jiaben		15 September 1910	28 January 1911
Vice President	Li Jiaju		22 March 1911	30 October 1911
Vice President	Dashou		30 October 1911	2 February 1912
Assistant Vice President (協理)	Jing Xing		20 January 1907	December 1909
Assistant Vice President (協理)	Lu Yuanding		20 January 1907	6 July 1908
Assistant Vice President (協理)	Ding Zhenduo		20 January 1907	1911
Assistant Vice President (協理)	Yu Liansan		20 January 1907	1911
Assistant Vice President (協理)	Li Jiaju		23 September 1909	14 April 1910
Assistant Vice President (協理)	Cao Hongxun		?	?
Manager (幫辦)	Baoxi		1908	1911
Manager (幫辦)	Shen Yunpei		1908	1911
Manager (幫辦)	Gu Huang		1908	1911
Secretary General	Jin Bangping		?	2 February 1912

List of members of the Advisory Council
No.	Member Peerage	Portrait	Constituency	Party (Note: Key: Constitutionalist party ; Revolutionaries party ; Nonpartisan . Translation for reference only. Party membership from)	Notes
1	Kuibin; Prince Rui		Princes of Imperial Family	Nonpartisan	
2	Zaigong; Prince Zhuang		Princes of Imperial Family	Continuous	
3	Nelehe; Prince Shuncheng		Princes of Imperial Family	Nonpartisan	
4	Zaiying; Venerable Prince		Princes of Imperial Family	Nonpartisan	
5	Zairun; Venerable Prince		Princes of Imperial Family	Nonpartisan	
6	Puyu; Defender Duke by Grace		Princes of Imperial Family	Continuous	
7	Quanrong; Defender Duke by Grace		Princes of Imperial Family	Continuous	
8	Shouquan; Bulwark Duke by Grace		Princes of Imperial Family	Continuous	
9	Zaikai; Duke		Princes of Imperial Family	Continuous	
10	Zaizhen; Banner Prince, Defender General		Princes of Imperial Family	Nonpartisan	
11	Yuying; Defender General		Princes of Imperial Family	Nonpartisan	
12	Zaiyan; Supporter General		Princes of Imperial Family	Nonpartisan	
13	Sheng Kun; Defender General		Princes of Imperial Family	Nonpartisan	
14	Shengkun; General		Princes of Imperial Family	Continuous	
15	Nayantu; Prince of the Blood		Princes of Feudatories	Nonpartisan	
16	Sodnomjamtsoi; Prince of the Blood		Princes of Feudatories	Nonpartisan	
17	Dorjpalam; Prince of Commandery		Princes of Feudatories	Nonpartisan	
18	Gungsangnorbu; Prince of Commandery		Princes of Feudatories	Science	
19	色凌敦魯布; Prince of Commandery		Princes of Feudatories	Nonpartisan	
20	色隆托濟勒; Prince of Commandery		Princes of Feudatories	Nonpartisan	
21	勒旺諾爾布; Prince of Commandery		Princes of Feudatories	Nonpartisan	
22	特古斯阿勒坦呼雅克圖; Prince of Commandery		Princes of Feudatories	Nonpartisan	
23	巴勒珠爾那布坦; Prince of Commandery		Princes of Feudatories	Nonpartisan	
24	綳楚克車林; Banner Prince		Princes of Feudatories	Nonpartisan	Resigned
24	Mijiddorjiin Khanddorj; Prince of the Blood		Princes of Feudatories	Nonpartisan	Succeeded in 27th meeting
25	博迪蘇; Bulwark Duke		Princes of Feudatories	Nonpartisan	
26	達木黨蘇倫; Defender Duke		Princes of Feudatories	Nonpartisan	
27	司迪克; Bulwark Duke		Princes of Feudatories	Nonpartisan	
28	那木濟勒錯布丹; Bulwark Duke		Princes of Feudatories	Nonpartisan	
29	希璋; Duke		Nobilities of Manchu and Han	Continuous	
30	黃懋澄; Duke		Nobilities of Manchu and Han	Nonpartisan	
31	志鈞; Duke		Nobilities of Manchu and Han	Nonpartisan	
32	榮泉; Duke		Nobilities of Manchu and Han	Nonpartisan	
33	榮墪; Duke		Nobilities of Manchu and Han	Nonpartisan	
34	延秀; Marquess		Nobilities of Manchu and Han	Nonpartisan	
35	曾廣鑾; Marquess		Nobilities of Manchu and Han	Nonpartisan	
36	存興; Marquess		Nobilities of Manchu and Han	Nonpartisan	
37	李長祿; Viscount		Nobilities of Manchu and Han	Continuous	
38	敬昌; Viscount		Nobilities of Manchu and Han	Nonpartisan	
39	劉能紀; Baron		Nobilities of Manchu and Han	Nonpartisan	
40	胡祖蔭; Baron		Nobilities of Manchu and Han	Continuous	
41	定秀; Uksun		Descendants of Emperor	Continuous	
42	世珣; Uksun		Descendants of Emperor	Nonpartisan	
43	榮普; Uksun		Descendants of Emperor	Continuous	
44	成善; Uksun		Descendants of Emperor	Nonpartisan	
45	景安; Gioro		Descendants of Emperor	Continuous	
46	宜純; Gioro		Descendants of Emperor	Nonpartisan	
47	奎濂		Government Officials	Nonpartisan	
48	陳懋鼎		Government Officials	Xinhai	
49	趙椿年		Government Officials	Xinhai	
50	錫嘏		Government Officials	Nonpartisan	
51	榮凱		Government Officials	Nonpartisan	
52	毓善		Government Officials	Continuous	
53	劉道仁		Government Officials	Tongmenghui; Xinhai (1911–)	
54	文哲琿		Government Officials	Continuous	
55	~~張緝光~~		Government Officials	Nonpartisan	Resigned in 7th meeting
55	崇芳		Government Officials	Nonpartisan	Succeeded in 17th meeting
56	李經畬		Government Officials	Continuous	
57	林炳章		Government Officials	Continuous	
58	慶蕃		Government Officials	Nonpartisan	
59	顧棟臣		Government Officials	Continuous	
60	何藻翔		Government Officials	Xinhai	
61	陳善同		Government Officials	Continuous	
62	劉澤熙		Government Officials	Xinhai	"Leading member of appointed members"
63	魏聯奎		Government Officials	Continuous	
64	趙炳麟		Government Officials	Continuous	
65	儼忠		Government Officials	Nonpartisan	
66	胡駿		Government Officials	Continuous; Xinhai (1911–)	
67	王璟芳		Government Officials	Xinhai	
68	文溥		Government Officials	Continuous	
69	吳敬修		Government Officials	Nonpartisan	
70	Ke Shaomin		Government Officials	Continuous	
71	榮厚		Government Officials	Continuous	
72	胡礽泰		Government Officials	Science	
73	汪榮寶		Government Officials	Science	
74	~~劉華~~		Government officials	Nonpartisan	Resigned
74	Lu Zongyu		Government officials	Science	Succeeded in 17th meeting
75	Changfu		Government officials	Xinhai	
76	Cao Yuanzhong		Government officials	Continuous	
77	Wu Weibing		Government officials	Nonpartisan	
78	Guo Jiaji		Government officials	Continuous	
79	Wu Shijian (吳士鑒)		Scholars	Continuous	
80	Lao Naixuan		Scholars	Continuous	
81	Zhang Zongyuan		Scholars	Science	
82	Chen Baochen		Scholars	Continuous	
83	~~Shen Jiaben~~		Scholars	Preparative	Appointed as Vice President of the Council
84	Yen Fu		Scholars	Preparative	
85	~~Jiang Han~~		Scholars	Nonpartisan	Resigned
85	Wu Tingxie		Scholars	Nonpartisan	Succeeded in 17th meeting
86	Yu Changlin		Scholars	Continuous	
87	Shen Linyi		Scholars	Continuous (Conservative)	
88	Tao Baolian		Scholars	Continuous	
89	Sun Yifu		Large Taxpayers	Nonpartisan	
90	Li Shiyu		Large Taxpayers	Continuous	
91	Zhou Shunqing		Large Taxpayers	Continuous	
92	Lin Shaoji		Large Taxpayers	Nonpartisan	
93	Xi Shou		Large Taxpayers	Tongmenghui; Xinhai (1911–)	
94	Wang Zuoliang		Large Taxpayers	Continuous	
95	Song Zhensheng		Large Taxpayers	Continuous	
96	Li Zhanyang		Large Taxpayers	Tongmenghui; Continuous (1911–)	
97	Luo Naixin		Large Taxpayers	Continuous	
98	Wang Hongtu		Large Taxpayers	Continuous	
99	Chen Yingzhou		Fengtian	Continuous	
100	Wang Yuquan		Fengtian	Nonpartisan	
101	Shuming (書銘)		Fengtian	Nonpartisan	
102	Qing Shan (慶山)		Jilin	Continuous	
103	Xu Muru		Jilin	Continuous	
104	Gui Shan (桂山)		Heilongjiang	Nonpartisan	
105	Dahanga		Heilongjiang	Nonpartisan	
106	Qi Shukai		Zhili	Continuous	
107	Li Ju		Zhili	CERA	
108	Liu Chunlin		Zhili	Continuous	
109	Ji Zhongyin		Zhili	CERA	
110	Yu Banghua		Zhili	Continuous	
111	Wu Dezhen		Zhili	Continuous	
112	Chen Shukai		Zhili	Continuous	
113	Li Yirong		Zhili	Continuous	
114	Hu Jiaqi		Zhili	Preparative	
115	~~Xu Dinglin~~		Jiangsu	Continuous (Moderate)	Later appointed as President
116	Meng Zhaochang		Jiangsu	Science; Preparative	"Leading member amongst elected members"
117	Lei Fen		Jiangsu	CERA	"Leading member of the Council"
118	Xia Yinguan		Jiangsu	CERA	
119	Ma Shijie		Jiangsu	Continuous	
120	Pan Hongding		Jiangsu	Continuous	
121	Fang Huan (方还)		Jiangsu	Continuous	
122	Jiang Qian		Anhui	Continuous	
123	Jiang Xin		Anhui	CERA	
124	Liu Rushi		Anhui	Nonpartisan	
125	Li Guoyun		Anhui	Nonpartisan	
126	Tao Rong		Anhui	Petition; Tongmenghui (1911–)	
127	閔荷生		Kiangsi	Petition (Conservative)	
128	鄒國瑋		Kiangsi	Continuous	
129	汪龍光		Kiangsi	Continuous	
130	劉景烈		Kiangsi	Preparative	
131	~~喻兆蕃~~		Kiangsi	Nonpartisan	Resigned
131	黃象熙		Kiangsi	Nonpartisan	Succeeded in 3rd meeting
132	文龢		Kiangsi	Nonpartisan	
133	陳敬第		Chekiang	CERA	
134	余鏡清		Chekiang	Preparative	
135	鄭際平		Chekiang	Xinhai	
136	王廷揚		Chekiang	Tongmenghui	
137	邵羲		Chekiang	CERA; Preparative	
138	王佐		Chekiang	Nonpartisan	
139	陶葆霖		Chekiang	Continuous	
140	康詠		Fukien	Continuous	
141	楊廷綸		Fukien	Continuous	
142	張選青		Fukien	Continuous	
143	李慕韓		Fukien	Continuous	
144	胡柏年		Hupeh	Continuous	
145	陳國瓚		Hupeh	Continuous	
146	鄭潢		Hupeh	Continuous	
147	談鉞		Hupeh	Continuous	
148	~~黃文潤~~		Hupeh	Nonpartisan	Charged and resigned
148	陶峻		Hupeh	Nonpartisan	Succeeded in 3rd meeting
149	羅傑		Hunan	Xinhai	
150	湯魯璠		Hunan	Nonpartisan	
151	~~馮錫仁~~		Hunan	Nonpartisan	Died in office
151	黎尚雯		Hunan	Tongmenghui; Xinhai (1911–)	Succeeded in 3rd meeting
152	唐右楨		Hunan	Nonpartisan	
153	易宗夔		Hunan	Xinhai (Radical)	Spoken the most in first session
154	陳命官		Shantung	Tongmenghui	
155	王昱祥		Shantung	Nonpartisan	
156	彭占元		Shantung	Tongmenghui; Friends (1911–)	
157	尹祚章		Shantung	Continuous	
158	鄭熙嘏		Shantung	Continuous	
159	蔣鴻斌		Shantung	Joint Assemblies	
160	王紹勛		Honan	Continuous	
161	張之銳		Honan	Nonpartisan	
162	彭運斌		Honan	Petition	
163	李時燦		Honan	Nonpartisan	
164	陶毓瑞		Honan	Continuous	
165	~~渠本翹~~		Shansi	Petition	Resigned in 12th meeting
165	劉懋賞		Shansi	Tongmenghui	Succeeded in 14th meeting
166	李華炳		Shansi	CERA	
167	~~解榮輅~~		Shansi	Nonpartisan	Charged and resigned
167	王用霖		Shansi	CERA	Succeeded in 3rd meeting
168	~~劉緜訓~~		Shansi	Tongmenghui	Charged and resigned
168	李素		Shansi	Tongmenghui; Friends (1911–)	Succeeded in 3rd meeting
169	劉志詹		Shansi	CERA	
170	周鏞		Shensi	Nonpartisan	
171	吳懷清		Shensi	Nonpartisan	
172	盧潤瀛		Shensi	Continuous	
173	梁守典		Shensi	Continuous	
174	王曜南		Kansu	Continuous	
175	楊錫田		Kansu	Continuous	
176	羅其光		Kansu	Continuous	
177	李文熙		Sichuan	Joint Assemblies; Friends (1911–)	
178	高凌霄		Sichuan	Continuous	
179	張政		Sichuan	Continuous	
180	劉緯		Sichuan	Nonpartisan	
181	郭策勳		Sichuan	Joint Assemblies	
182	萬慎		Sichuan	Continuous	
183	劉曜垣		Kwangtung	Nonpartisan	
184	周廷勵		Kwangtung	Nonpartisan	
185	王廷獻		Kwangtung	Kwangtung Autonomy	
186	黃毓棠		Kwangtung	Nonpartisan	
187	劉述堯		Kwangtung	Nonpartisan	
188	~~黃廼昌~~		Kwangsi	Nonpartisan	Died in office
188	黃晉蒲		Kwangsi	Nonpartisan	Succeeded in 3rd meeting
189	馮汝梅		Kwangsi	Nonpartisan	
190	吳賜齡		Kwangsi	CERA (Radical)	
191	~~陳榮昌~~		Yunnan	Tongmenghui	Resigned before 3rd meeting
192	張之霖		Yunnan	Continuous	
193	顧視高		Yunnan	Xinhai	
194	范彭齡		Yunnan	Nonpartisan	
195	~~鍾振玉~~		Kweichow	Kweichow Autonomy	Died
195	劉榮勛		Kweichow	Kweichow Autonomy	Succeeded
196	牟琳		Kweichow	Kweichow Preparative; Xinhai (1911–)	

Supplementary members include:

- 不入八分鎮國公載岐 (27 May 1911 appointed)
- 三等承恩公瑞興 (27 May 1911 appointed)
- 札薩克郡王鞥克濟爾噶勒 (27 May 1911 appointed)
- 札薩克輔國公巴彥濟爾噶勒 (27 May 1911 appointed)
- 黎湛枝 (22 July 1911 appointed)
- 恩華 (22 July 1911 appointed)
- 錢承鋕 (22 July 1911 appointed)
- 范源濂 (22 July 1911 appointed)
- 陳錦濤 (22 July 1911 appointed)
- 奉國將軍溥善 (3 October 1911 appointed)
- 一等侯德啟 (3 October 1911 appointed)
- 彥惠 (3 October 1911 appointed)
- 王季烈 (3 October 1911 appointed)
- 程明超 (3 October 1911 appointed)

== Gallery ==
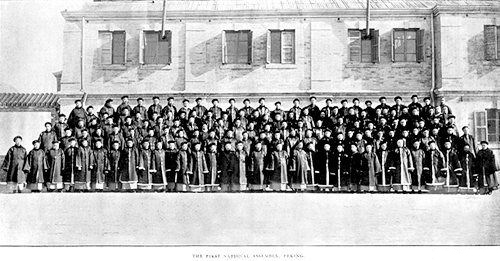
The inaugural meeting of the Advisory Council on 3 October 1910.

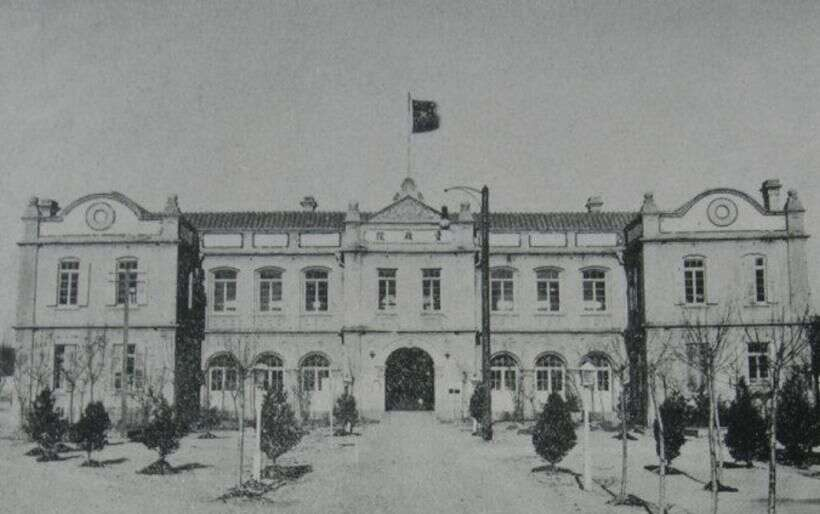
The Advisory Council building

== See also ==
- National Assembly (Republic of China)
- National People's Congress

== Sources ==
- 李, 啟成 (2011). 資政院議場會議速記錄 [Records of Proceedings on Floor of Advisory Council] (in Chinese) (1st ed.). Shanghai: 上海三聯書店. ISBN 978-7-5426-3462-7.
