= New Policies =

Reforms of the late Qing dynasty

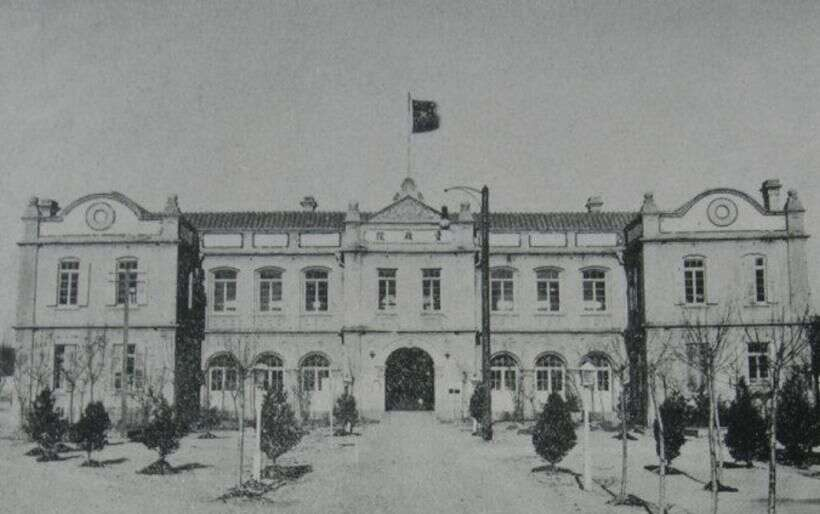
- Building of the Advisory Council, a preparatory body for the parliament established during the New Policies
- Chinese: 晚清改革
- Literal meaning: Late Qing Reforms
Transcriptions
Standard Mandarin
- Hanyu Pinyin: Wǎnqīng gǎigé
Yue: Cantonese
- Jyutping: maan5 cing1 goi2 gaak3

Alternative name
- Chinese: 清末新政
- Literal meaning: New Policies of the late Qing
Transcriptions
Standard Mandarin
- Hanyu Pinyin: Qīngmò xīnzhèng
Yue: Cantonese
- Jyutping: cing1 mut6 san1 zing3

The New Policies of the late Qing dynasty (Chinese: 清末新政; pinyin: Qīngmò xīnzhèng), also known as the New Deal of the late Qing dynasty or the Late Qing reforms (Chinese: 晚清改革; pinyin: Wǎnqīng gǎigé), and simply referred to as New Policies, were a series of cultural, economic, educational, military, diplomatic, and political reforms implemented in the last decade of the Qing dynasty to keep the dynasty in power after the invasions of the great powers of the Eight Nation Alliance in league with the ten provinces of the Southeast Mutual Protection during the Boxer Rebellion.

Late Qing reforms started in 1901, and since they were implemented with the backing of the Empress Dowager Cixi, they are also called Cixi's New Policies. The reforms were often considered more radical than the earlier Self-Strengthening Movement which came to an abrupt end with China's defeat in the First Sino-Japanese War in 1895. Despite the reforms and other political struggles, the revolutionaries led the 1911 Revolution which resulted in the fall of the Qing dynasty.

== Names ==
In China, the reform is most commonly known as New Policies of the late Qing dynasty (清末新政), and is also called Gengzi New Policies (庚子新政), Post-Gengzi New Policies (庚子后新政). After the fall of the Qing dynasty, in the Republic of China, it was called "shame-covering reforms" (遮羞變法). In Hong Kong, it was called Late Qing reforms (晚清改革), and in Japan, it was called the Guangxu's New Policies (光緒新政, kōsho shinsei), in reference to Emperor Guangxu.

== Politics ==
In April 1901, the Qing dynasty established the Administration Office to supervise the overall plan for reform, appointing Ronglu, Yikuang and Li Hongzhang as managers, nominating Zhang Zhidong and Liu Kunyi as coordinators. Zhang Zhidong and Liu Kunyi jointly submitted "Three folds for reform" to the imperial government, which includes setting reform direction, learning from Japan and transitioning to a constitutional monarchy.

=== Five ministers went abroad to investigate ===
On January 19, 1904, viceroy of Yun-Gui Ding Zhenduo and Yunnan provincial Patrol Lin Shaonian submitted the application for political reform to the imperial government. At the beginning of the July, Viceroy of Liangjiang Zhou Wei asked for the implementation of the "separation of the three powers" political system.

On July 2, 1905, Yuan Shikai joined with Zhou Wei and viceroy of Huguang Zhang Zhidong to request the imperial government to implement a constitutional government over a twelve-year period. They also asked the government to assign ministers to go abroad to investigate various political formats.

On September 24, 1905, Empress Dowager Cixi decided to assign five ministers: Zhen Prince Zaize, Financial Minister Dai Hongci, Military Minister Xu Shichang, Governor of Hunan Duanfang and Prime Minister of Business Department Shaoying to go abroad. On November 25, the imperial government set up a special institution "Inspection of the political pavilion" to study the constitutional government of each country, and provide guidance on constitutional reform.

In the same year, on December 7, the first group led by Dai Hongci and Duanfang set off at the first stop, the United States, and was met by the US President Theodore Roosevelt. On January 14, 1906, the second group led by Zaize set out. At the end of summer, 1906, the delegation returned to China and submitted a report arguing that “The only way for the state to be powerful is constitutionalism”.

On September 1, 1906, the Empress Dowager Cixi promulgated an imperial decree, announcing preparatory imitation of constitution.

In 1907, the preparatory office of the Zizhengyuan Institute (Parliament) was established, and Ming Lun and Sun Jiaxuan were appointed as the presidents of the Zizhengyuan Institute. Later, Zhang Jiang and Tang Shouqian established a preparatory constitutional guild in Shanghai. After that, various constitutional guilds were established in major cities all around China.

In August 1908, the imperial government published the "Constitutional Outline", "The list of Preparations in next few years", and three appendices including "Civil Rights and Obligations", "The essentials of Parliament", "Election Law Essentials". These proposed laws regulated that the provincial advisory council and Central Advisory Council would be elected in the next year and the constitution was plan to prepared in nine years. On November 14, 1908, the Emperor Guangxu died, with Empress Dowager Cixi dying the following day.

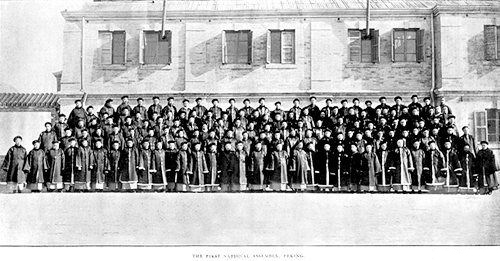
The inaugural meeting of the Qing parliament in 1909

In 1909, the Qing government held parliamentary elections to the Advisory Council and provincial elections.

In 1909, after Pu Yi, the last emperor of the Qing dynasty, succeeded to the throne, the provincial advisory councils were elected. In 1910, the Zizheng Institute held its first opening ceremony.

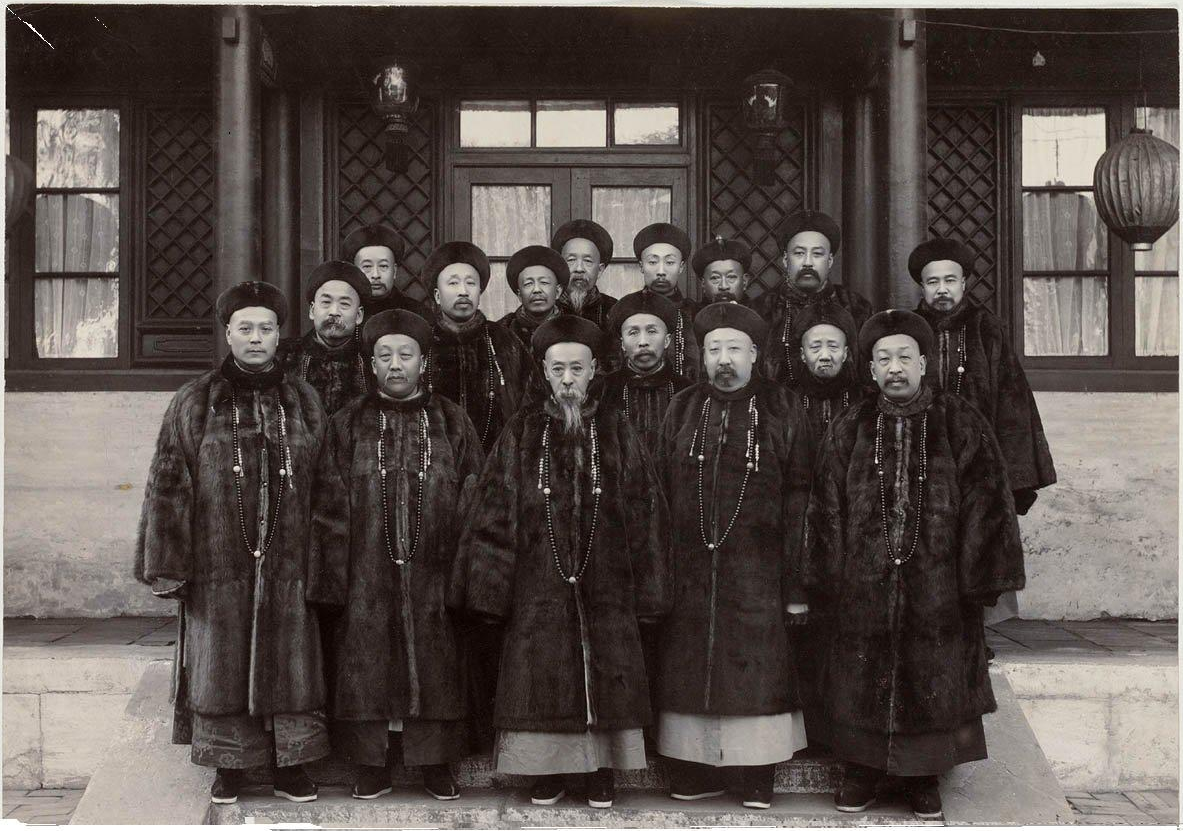
Prince Qing's Cabinet

In May 1911, the prince regent Zaifeng appointed Yikuang, Prince Qing as the Prime Minister of the Imperial Cabinet to organize the new cabinet. The head of the new cabinet had 13 members, including eight Manchurians, four Han Chinese, and one Mongolian. As seven of the Manchurians belonged to the royal family, the cabinet was known as a "royal cabinet".

=== Local administrative reform ===
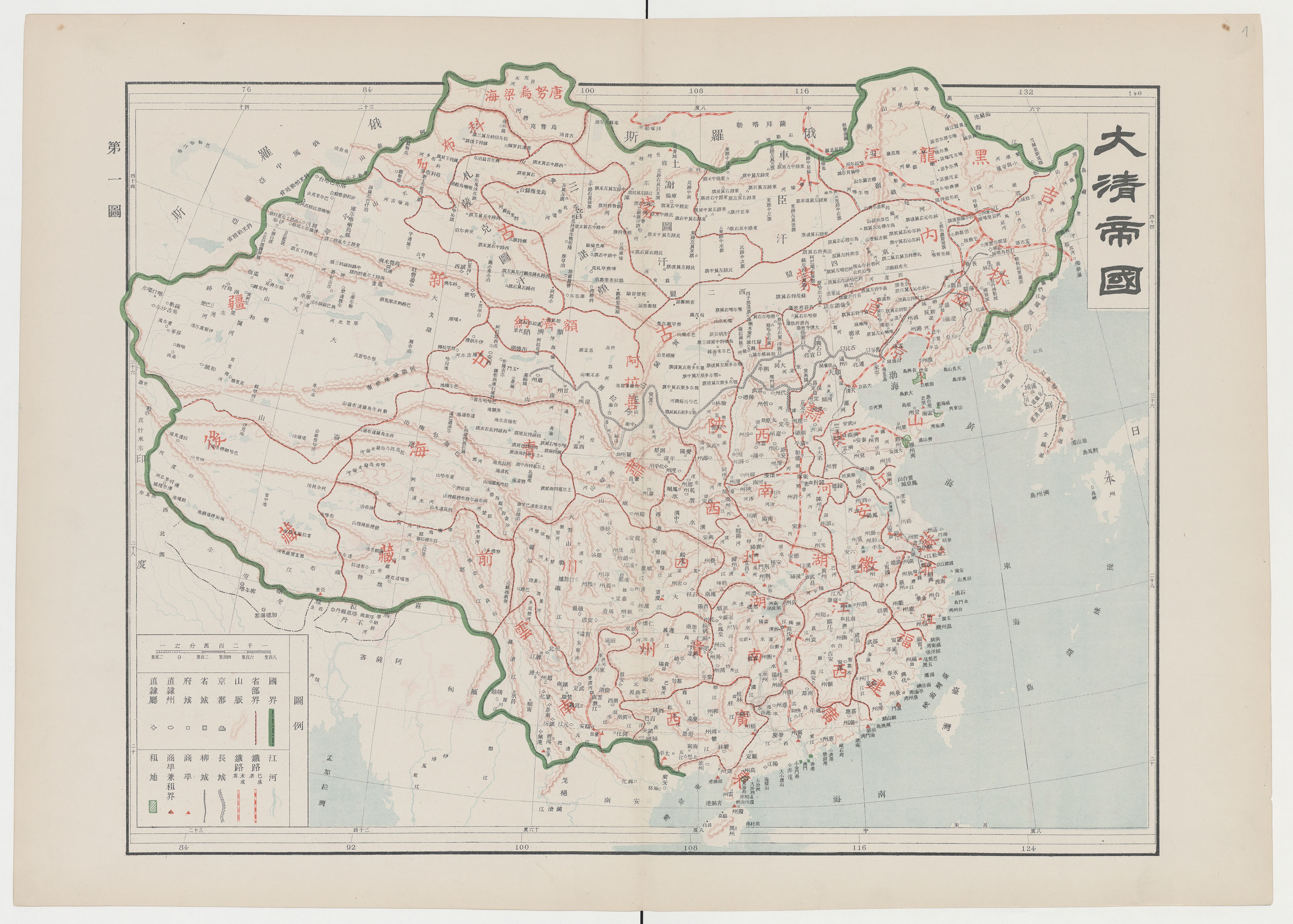
Official map of the Qing Empire published in 1905.

In 1902, Shanxi governor Zhao Erxun proposed to reform the local administrative reforms such as the Baojia system, including the establishment of the modern police system and the expansion of local organizational functions.

In 1907, the local official system was promulgated, and the financial power and military power of the governor were reduced. The Ministry of Civil Affairs owned the function of the national patrol.

=== Local autonomy reform measures ===
In 1906, Yuan Shikai had already established the local “Autonomous Research Institute” and the Tianjin County Council in Tianjin. In 1908, the imperial government also began to set up autonomous research institutes in the urban area, and draft the "Regulations of the Provincial Consultative Councils", which was scheduled to be completed in 1914.

== Military ==
=== Officer training ===
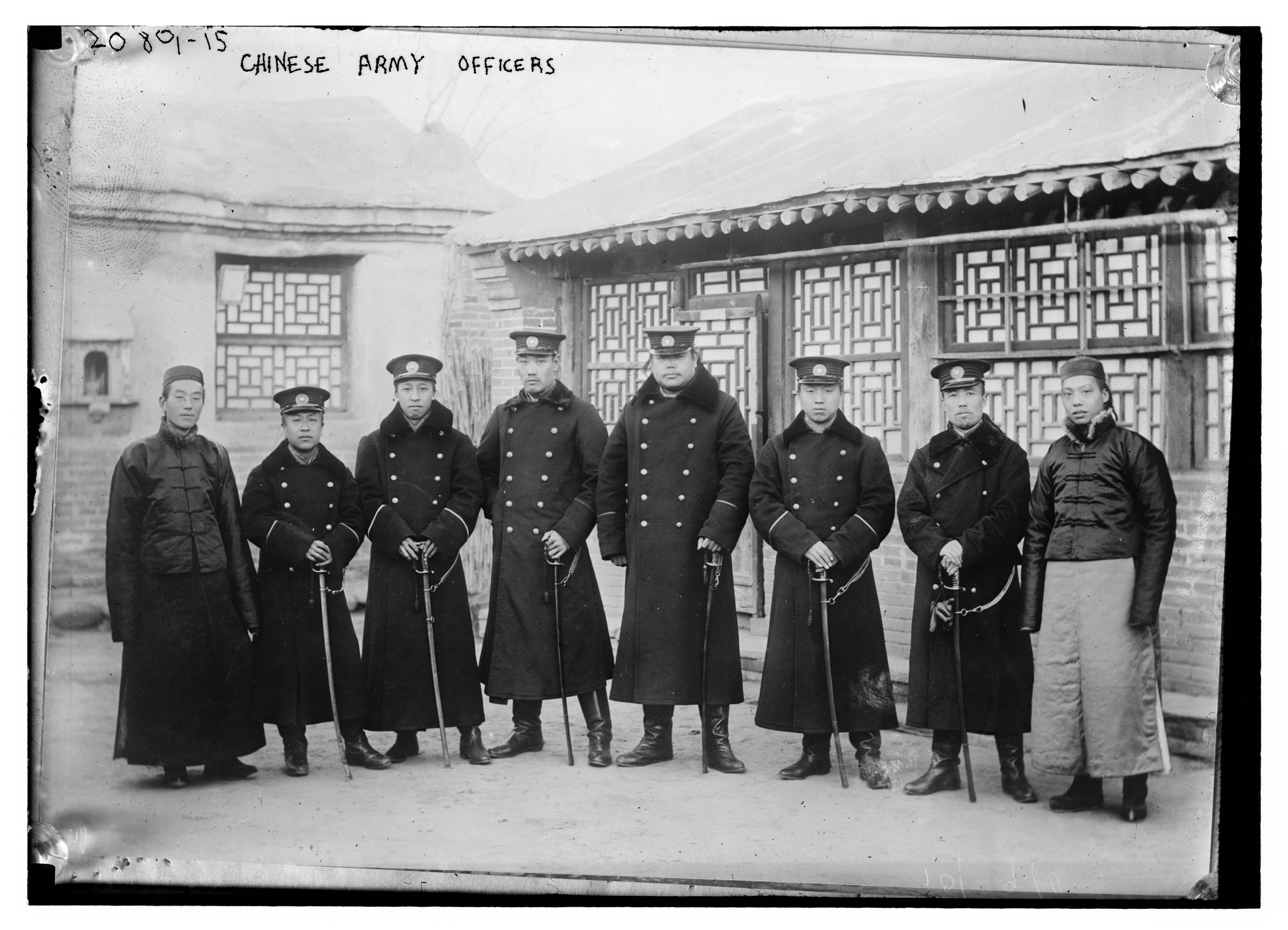
Chinese military officers in the early 1900s

In 1901, the imperial government abolished the test of traditional Chinese Martial and founded the training system for officers. Then, in 1903, the Central Training Command was established to coordinate the training of the national army.

=== Ordnance ===
In 1901, the imperial government established three arsenals in Hanyang, Shanghai, and Guangzhou.

=== Army ===
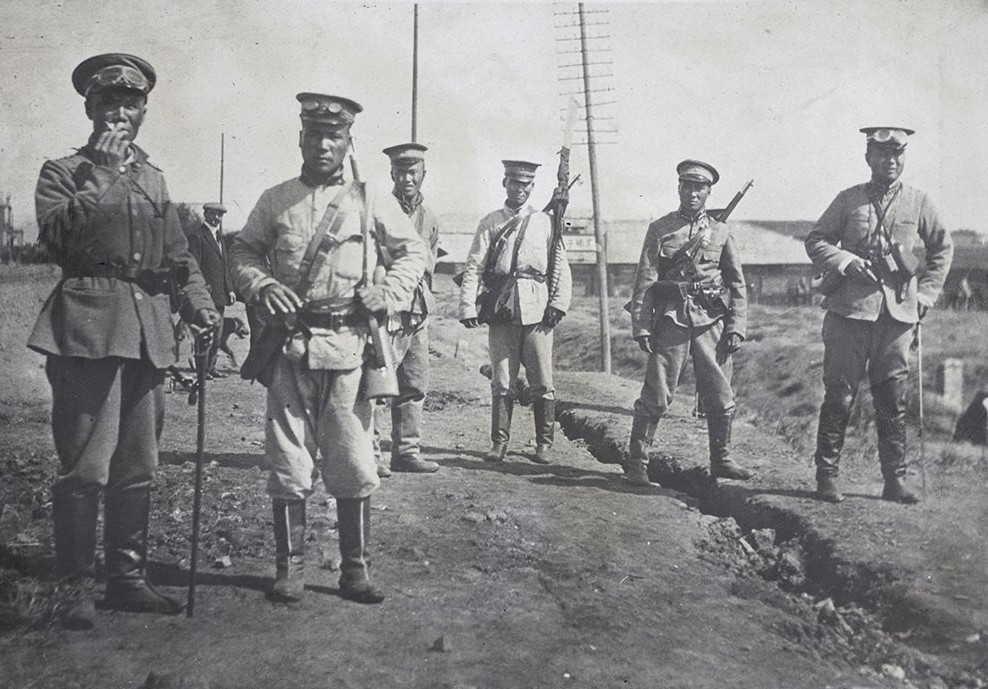
The Qing army in 1911

In 1905, the Beiyang Army was reorganized into a New Army. The imperial government originally planned to establish 500,000 regular troops in the next ten years, but until the end of 1911 (the collapse of the Qing dynasty), only about 190,000 troops had been well-trained.

An edict on 15 July 1909 was passed that established the Ministry of War to control the army.

==== The Report of 1904 ====
In the summer of 1904, the Commission for Army Reorganisation published a lengthy plan for the reorganisation of the army. The plan called for the regular dispatch of central government officials to the provinces to check that imperial decrees were being followed, something which had not been the case previously. In a concession to the provinces, the new armies were to be controlled by the provinces and raised by them, but ultimately responsible to the throne and used by the throne when necessary. The 8 banners were notably not included in the program of reform. The report highlighted the need for specialised officers who were educated, as well as officers in staff and frontline roles, with a preference for academy-trained personnel. The pay of officers was to be increased to cover their cost of living and reduce the need for officers to engage in corruption to cover their own expenses, with harsher punishments for those who did. Officers were given detailed regulations and were expected to lead their men, as opposed to drill instructors, who, due to the lack of qualified officers, were often employed to instruct the men. These interim officers were useless in battle, and the men had little faith in them. Officers were therefore expected to instruct their own men. The recruits themselves were to have a literacy rate of 20%, along with promotion and demotion being introduced. These literate men were to form the NCOs of the army. A system of pensions and rewards, left unenforced since 1737, was to be reintroduced, with rewards for bravery and service, including pensions for the retired, dead, and disabled.

A western-style system of medical and logistical services was also recommended from the frontline to base hospitals in the interior. The report also called for the standardisation of weapons on a simple, durable, but modern model of weaponry. The army itself was divided into 3 categories as per the Western standard: firstly, the standing army, then the first-class reserves, then the second-class reserves. The regulars would serve for 3 years, then return home and be enrolled in the first reserve for a further 3 years, followed by 4 years in the second reserve, with decreasing pay and training per level of service.

The report also called for a new table of organisation. The basic organisation was a corps of 2 divisions, with each division containing a staff of 2 brigades of infantry, 1 regiment each of cavalry and artillery, and 1 battalion each of engineers and transportation men, as well as a band. The authorised strength of a division was 748 officers and 10,436 NCOs and privates with 1,328 support staff for 12,512. Each corps was to possess 1,595 officers, 23,760 enlisted men, 4,469 horses and mules, and 108 guns. It was estimated that each corps would cost 2,778,222 taels per corps or 1,300,000 per division. With 36 divisions, this would amount to a minimum expense of 50,000,000 taels annually on the new army.

A new pay scale was also introduced, with monthly payments of 1600 taels for a corps commander, 1000 taels for a division commander, 500 taels for a brigade commander, 400 taels for a regimental commander, 180-260 taels for a battalion commander, 58–64 taels for a company commander, 25 taels for Lieutenants, 5.1 taels for sergeants, 4.8 taels for corporals, 4.5 taels for first-class privates, 4.2 taels for privates, and 3.3 taels for supernumeraries.

=== Navy ===
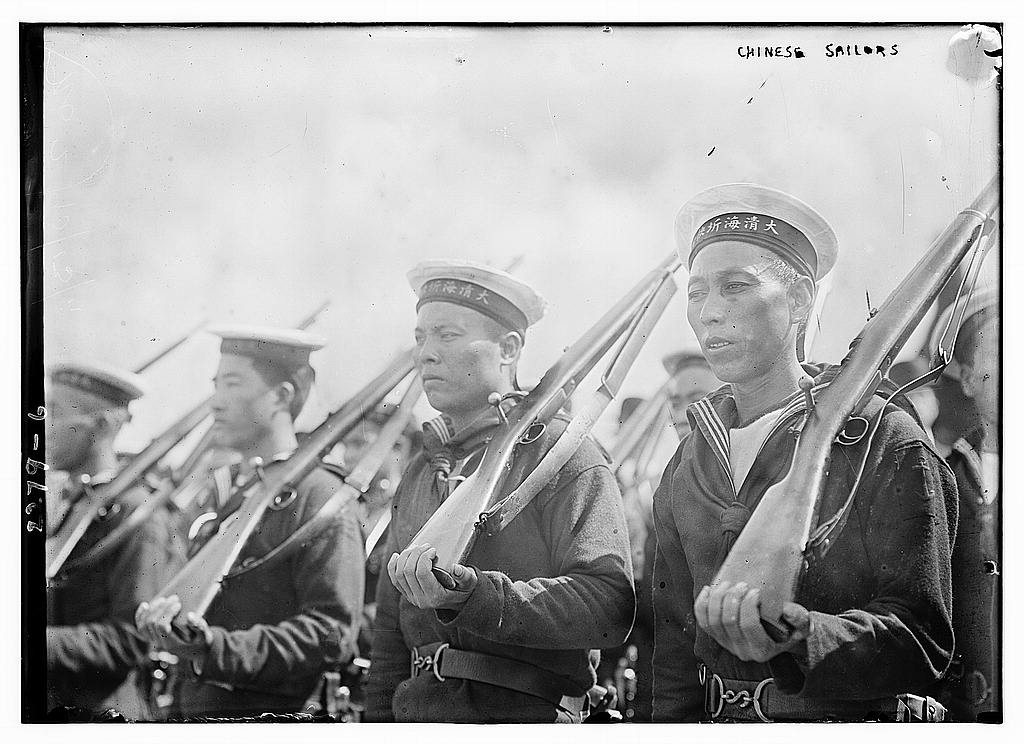
The Imperial Chinese Navy in 1911

In 1902, Beiyang Fleet officer Sa Zhenbing proposed four methods for reviving the Imperial Chinese Navy. First, sending naval officers to study in Japan. Second, setting up a naval school in Jiangyin. Third, building Mawei Shipyard as a ship repair base. Fourth, setting up a naval guard town in Yantai and Fuzhou.

== Other aspects ==
The policies reformed almost every aspect of governmental affairs:

- In education, traditional academies became western-style schools, abolishing the imperial examinations, and various textbooks were published throughout the country. Each province established a military academy.
- A new code and judicial system came in law. The system of fiscal control and tax collection expanded and regularized, an especially important task since the Boxer Indemnity required payments to foreign powers which exceeded the annual income of the national government.
- Local and regional police forces were organized, with model prisons opened.
- Foreign affairs. The foreign affair office was established in 1901, to replace the former Zongli Yamen.

== Evaluation ==
The impact of these reforms varied from place to place. Many regions were virtually unchanged, while the provinces in the lower Yangzi valley had already taken the lead. The province of Zhili (roughly present day Hebei) was a model. With the strong support of the Empress Dowager, Yuan Shikai set up a strong bureaucracy to administer tax collection, local schools and police.

However, there is still debate among the academic community regarding the actual effect that these reforms had on the Chinese people, historian Immanuel Hsü claiming that, apart from the successes in "...the abolition of the civil service examinations… the establishment of modern schools… and the sending of students abroad…”, the reforms were "…essentially a noisy demonstration without much substance or promise of accomplishment…". However, other historians, such as Diana Preston, place much greater weight on the influence of these reforms on the later development of China in its progression towards a more 'developed' society, contending that "…the events of 1900 and their aftermath precipitated reforms that, albeit late [and] grudging, were far-reaching and laid the foundations for a modern state…".

On 22 July 1908 the Qing government issued the Principles of the Constitution, modeled on the Japanese Meiji Constitution, which provided for gradual introduction of an electoral system beginning with local elections in 1908, followed in two years by elections for provincial legislatures, then two years later, elections for a national assembly. Special bureaus were set up in each province to prepare for setting up assemblies, directly subordinated to the provincial governor and consisting of scholars and gentry. They set up regulations for carrying out the elections, a timetable for carrying them out, and notices. The first to hold elections for the provincial assembly was the Jiangsu province, in 1909, and elections occurred on time in all provinces except for Xinjiang.

The New Policies also resulted in drastic change of the Manchu policy toward Mongolia from a relatively conservative-protective one to an aggressive-colonial one. Also, after the British expedition to Tibet in 1904 and the Sino-British treaty in 1906, Qing China sent the 1910 expedition to Tibet for establishing direct rule over Tibet.

== See also ==
- Self-Strengthening Movement
- Hundred Days' Reform
- New Army
- Preparative Constitutionalism
- Mongolia under Qing rule
- Tibet under Qing rule
- 1911 Revolution
