= Tang Shouqian =

Chinese industrialist and politician (1856–1917)

- 汤寿潜
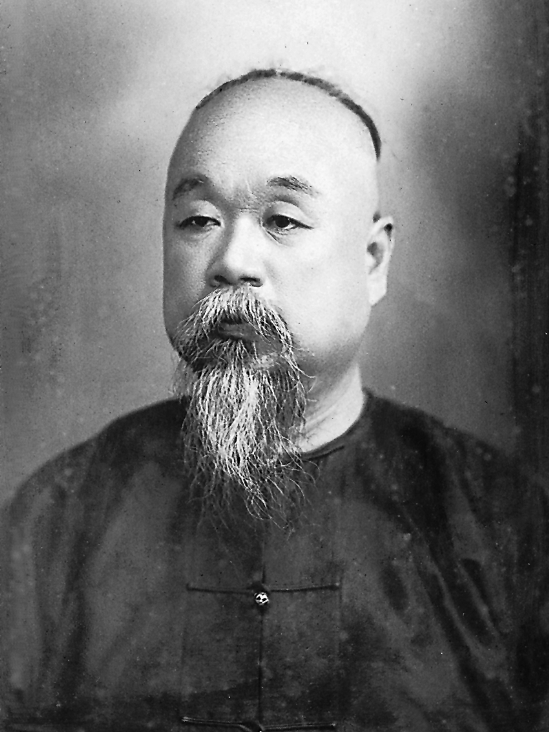
- Born: Tang Dengying; Courtesy name: Zhexian 蛰先 (also written Zhexian 蛰仙); July 3, 1856; Datangwu Village, Tianle Township, Shanyin County, Shaoxing Prefecture, Zhejiang Province, Qing dynasty (present-day Tang Shouqian Former Residence Exhibition Hall, Jinhua Town, Xiaoshan District, Hangzhou, Zhejiang Province)
- Died: June 6, 1917 (aged 60); Tang Residence, Niuchangtou, Linpu Town, Shaoxing, Zhejiang Province, Republic of China (present-day Linpu Town, Xiaoshan District, , Hangzhou, Zhejiang Province)
- Resting place: Yangshan Ban, Zhisu Township, Tonglu County, Zhejiang Province (present-day Yangshan Fan Village, Hengcun Town, Tonglu County, Hangzhou, Zhejiang Province)
- Citizenship: Qing dynasty (1856–1911); Republic of China (1911–1917)
- Political party: Preparatory Constitutionalist Public Society (1906–1911); Unity Party (1912)
- Family: From Shanyin, Zhejiang

Tang Shouqian (July 3, 1856 — June 6, 1917), courtesy name Zhexian (also written Zhexian), commonly known as Tang Zhe Lao, was a native of Tianle Township, Shanyin County, Zhejiang Province (present-day Xiaoshan District, Hangzhou), with ancestral origins in Min County (present-day Fuzhou). Tang Shouqian was an industrialist and political activist of the late Qing dynasty and early Republic of China. In his early years he engaged in the Reform Movement and the Constitutionalist Movement. In his later years, he led the Zhejiang Railway Company in successfully opposing the Qing government's sale of railway rights during the Railway Protection Movement, and briefly led the Zhejiang revolutionary government during the Xinhai Revolution, serving as the first Military Governor of Zhejiang. Zhang Jian praised him as one "long celebrated for his knowledge of current affairs, and later renowned for his work on railways".

== Life ==
=== Early life ===
Tang Shouqian was born on 3 July 1856 in the Tang family ancestral home in Datangwu Village, Tianle Township, Shanyin County, Shaoxing Prefecture, Zhejiang Province (present-day Jinhua Town, Xiaoshan District, Hangzhou). His original given name was Dengying 登瀛, his childhood name was Bingseng 丙僧, and his courtesy name was Xiaoqi 孝起 or alternatively Yixian 翼仙; he later changed his courtesy name to Zhexian 蛰先 or Zhexian 蛰仙, his academic name was Tang Zhen 汤震, and after passing the provincial examinations he changed his given name to Shouqian 寿潜. His father, Tang Peien, had served as a private secretary (shiye) in Zhouzhi County and Wugong County, Shaanxi, before returning home to work as a private tutor. Tang Shouqian entered the local school at age six, studying under Mr. Tang Yangshan and learning the Four Books and Five Classics. At eighteen he went to study in the provincial capital Hangzhou, and the following year married a woman surnamed Ye; a year after the marriage their eldest son was born. He failed the provincial examination in the fifth year of the Guangxu reign, placing fourth on the supplementary list. In 1886, the twelfth year of the Guangxu reign, he became a private secretary to Zhang Yao, Governor of Shandong. At the time the Yellow River floods were occurring, and Tang Shouqian devoted himself to investigating the Yellow River's water systems, consulting with waterworks labourers and elderly locals wherever he went, and advising Zhang Yao on river management. In the fourteenth year of Guangxu, he passed the provincial examinations, placing sixth on the main list; the following year he obtained the position of Grand Secretariat Secretary and met his lifelong friend Zhang Jian.

In April 1890, the sixteenth year of the Guangxu reign, Tang Shouqian published Dangerous Words (Wei Yan). In this work, he advocated relocating the capital to Chang'an, establishing a parliament, abolishing the Eight Banners, and building railways. The work was warmly received by society, went through multiple printings, and was said by contemporaries to compare favourably with Tang Zhen and Feng Guifen; Weng Tonghe also recommended the book to the Guangxu Emperor. That same year, he left Zhang Yao's service in Shandong and travelled north to sit the metropolitan examinations; after failing, he went to Shanghai and led a group of examination candidates in studying statecraft. In 1892, the eighteenth year of the Guangxu reign, he passed the imperial examinations and was selected as a Hanlin Academy Shujishi. After three years, his term expired; he was initially appointed as magistrate of Xiangning County, Shanxi, but requested a transfer closer to home to care for his parents and was reassigned to Qingyang County, Anhui in the neighbouring province. Before taking up his post, on 18 March, Weng Tonghe summoned Tang Shouqian for a heart-to-heart conversation; Weng wrote in his diary that Tang Shouqian "would surely be a good official". In April, Kang Youwei launched the Memorial of the Examination Candidates, and the reformist faction began to organise nationally. Tang Shouqian served as magistrate for only three months before resigning to return home to care for his ailing parents; he then went to the Lizheng Academy in Jinhua (present-day Jinhua No. 1 High School) to serve as headmaster, promoting education in "practical learning"; many of his students later participated in the Xinhai Revolution. That same year, Tang Shouqian joined the Self-Strengthening Society (张曜幕友) organised by Kang Youwei, together with Zhang Jian. (Note: According to the source note, Chen Zhifang's Chronology of Tang Shouqian records that Tang Shouqian joined the Self-Strengthening Society, but the Shanghai branch's membership list does not include his name; however, the Singapore newspaper Tiannan Xinbao does list him.) During the Hundred Days' Reform of 1898, Tang Shouqian was serving as a private secretary at the yamen of Zhejiang Governor Liao Shouheng; the Guangxu Emperor twice issued edicts (in May and July) instructing Liao Shouheng to summon Tang Shouqian, but Tang Shouqian each time pleaded his mother's serious illness as a reason to delay. In September, Cixi launched a coup and overturned the reforms, and the matter came to nothing.

After the failure of the reform movement, Tang Shouqian devoted most of his time to lecturing and writing, serving successively as headmaster of the Xunxi Academy in Huzhou and the Longmen Academy (present-day Shanghai High School) in Shanghai, and compiling works including Wuxue Zhishi Wenbian and Santong Kao Jiyao. In 1900, the twenty-sixth year of Guangxu, during the Eight-Power Allied Forces' invasion of China and the occupation of Beijing and Tianjin, Tang Shouqian and his friend Zhang Jian jointly proposed the concept of the "Southeast Mutual Protection" among the governors-general of the southeastern provinces. In May, before the Qing government had declared war on the foreign powers, Tang Shouqian had already travelled to Nanjing to lobby for mutual protection; on 18 June he again went with Zhang Jian to Nanjing to lobby Liu Kunyi, Governor-General of Liangjiang. Later, the Qing court, recognising his contributions to the Southeast Mutual Protection and his fame from Dangerous Words, appointed him as Salt Transport Commissioner of the Two Huai region; Tang Shouqian again declined citing his mother's illness. In 1903, the twenty-ninth year of Guangxu, the Su Bao case broke out; since Cai Yuanpei was closely associated with the newspaper Su Bao, and Tang Shouqian was Cai's fellow provincial and close friend, Tang Shouqian strongly urged Cai Yuanpei to go to Europe to avoid trouble before the case erupted, thereby saving Cai from involvement.

=== The Zhejiang Railway Dispute ===
After the defeat in the First Sino-Japanese War, the imperialist powers launched a scramble to carve up China, plundering Chinese railway and mineral rights. Local populations across the country demanded the recovery of rights. In 1898, the Qing government pledged the Hu-Hang-Yong Railway to Britain, and a preliminary agreement was signed, though a formal contract was never concluded. In 1905, an American merchant named Beitz, intimidated by the wave of railway protection agitation surrounding the Guanghan Railway, sought instead to acquire the Zhe-Gan Railway. At the time, Tang Shouqian was in Shanghai collaborating with Zhang Jian and Xu Dinglin to establish the Dada Steamship Company. On 29 March, the American merchant Beitz hosted a tea reception in Shanghai inviting Zhejiang merchants and gentry; at the gathering, Tang Shouqian was furious upon hearing of the Americans' designs on the Zhe-Gan Railway, immediately refused to cooperate with the Americans, and subsequently joined Xia Zengyou and Zhang Yuanji in calling on Zhejiang residents in Shanghai to establish a railway company. In July, the Zhejiang Railway Company was established, with Tang Shouqian as company director-general; after receiving approval from the Qing government's Ministry of Commerce and Agriculture, the imperial court issued an edict ordering Sheng Xuanhuai to recover the Su-Hang-Yong Railway rights that had already been sold—but Sheng Xuanhuai outwardly complied while inwardly resisting. In August, Tang Shouqian joined Zhang Jian, Xia Zengyou, Zhang Yuanji, and others in mobilising the Shanghai Chamber of Commerce to call for a boycott of American goods. In 1906, the Zhejiang Railway Company began constructing the Su-Hang-Yong Railway, but even as construction was underway, the Qing government, under British pressure, again sold the railway rights—using the pretext of borrowing from Britain to loan funds to the Zhejiang Railway Company, while in fact attempting to pledge the self-financed Zhejiang railway to Britain. Tang Shouqian and all staff of the Zhejiang Railway Company were unable to accept this, and organised the "Zhejiang Citizens' Loan Rejection Association" to oppose Qing government interference in the Zhejiang Railway. In 1907, Foreign Ministry official Wang Daxie proposed separating the borrowing and construction matters, suggesting maintaining the Zhejiang Railway construction programme while changing the funding source from self-raised capital to a British loan. The Zhejiang Railway Company voted to organise a loan rejection association in resistance; revolutionary party members also participated and organised suicide squads, and the situation in Jiangsu and Zhejiang took on the character of a rebellion. As the completion of the Shanghai-Hangzhou Railway drew near, Tang Shouqian and Chen Sanli prepared a Chinese merchant-operated railway company and appealed for the southeastern provinces to jointly build railways, travelling to Shantou and Guangzhou to promote the idea. In 1908, the Qing government appointed the rights-selling Sheng Xuanhuai as head of the Ministry of Posts and Communications; Sheng issued orders to ban the loan rejection association, secretly moved troops to attempt to suppress the Zhejiang railway agitation, forced the Zhejiang and Jiangsu railways to accept the loans, and simultaneously established the Shanghai-Hangzhou-Ningbo Railway Bureau to try to marginalise the Zhejiang and Jiangsu railway companies. In response to the court's repeated attempts to impose loans, Tang Shouqian sent a public telegram in the name of the Zhejiang Railway Company expressing opposition, and directly attacked Wang Daxie, Sheng Xuanhuai, and Yuan Shikai behind them, opposing the Qing court's employment of these men. The Qing government viewed him as a thorn in its side, appointing Tang Shouqian as Provincial Judge of Yunnan and Superintendent of Education of Jiangxi in attempts to remove him from the Zhejiang Railway, but Tang Shouqian consistently refused.

On 23 August 1910, because Tang Shouqian had publicly opposed Sheng Xuanhuai's appointment as Minister of Posts and Communications, the Qing government condemned him as "utterly unruly and perverse", issued orders stripping him of his position as director-general of the Zhejiang Railway Company, forbidding him from interfering in railway affairs, and requiring Jiangsu, Zhejiang, and Shanghai localities to prohibit gatherings on his behalf. Tang Shouqian was en route from Nanjing to Jiujiang when he received the order and returned to Hangzhou. The Qing government's intervention in private enterprise management caused a great uproar; social circles united to petition for Tang to remain in charge of the railway, the Zhejiang Railway Company also opposed the Qing government's order on the grounds that the position of director-general was a decision for shareholders, and Tang Shouqian recommended his son Xiaoji to succeed him as company director-general. In February 1911, the Zhejiang and Jiangsu railways jointly disbanded the Shanghai-Hangzhou-Ningbo Railway Bureau and dismissed the British chief engineer; after Sheng Xuanhuai and British Minister Jordan deliberated and decided to terminate the loan contract, the Zhejiang railway dispute was finally resolved. Although the dismissal episode had already ruptured Tang Shouqian's relationship with the Qing government, both officials and public opinion held him in extremely high regard, and his reputation continued to grow. As the Railway Protection Movement spread across the country, more and more officials, like Tang Shouqian, resisted the Qing government's sale of rights; Shanghai's Min Hu Ribao declared "China has ever more Tang Zhexians", and Tang Shouqian had become an iconic figure of the national Railway Protection Movement.

=== The Constitutionalist Movement and the Xinhai Revolution ===
Tang Shouqian had already expressed support for constitutionalism in his book Dangerous Words. During the Southeast Mutual Protection of 1900, Tang Shouqian again joined Zhang Jian in advocating constitutionalism to Liu Kunyi, Governor-General of Liangjiang, and the following year compiled Xianfa Guyi (Ancient Meaning of the Constitution), claiming that constitutions had existed in China since antiquity and propagating constitutionalist ideas. In 1906, the Qing government issued an edict for preparative constitutionalism. With the support of Cen Chunxuan, Governor-General of Guangdong and Guangxi, Zhang Jian launched the Preparatory Constitutionalist Public Society in Shanghai, with Cen's confidant Zheng Xiaoxu as president and Zhang Jian and his friend Tang Shouqian as vice-presidents; the three men twice launched the National Assembly Petition Movement, urging the Qing government to convene a parliament promptly. In 1908, under pressure from various localities, the Qing government promised to complete preparatory constitutionalism within nine years; the constitutionalists were not satisfied, however, and Tang Shouqian repeatedly petitioned for early convening of parliament as a matter of national survival. In 1909, provincial advisory councils (ziyiju) were convened across the country; Tang Shouqian, as the speaker publicly nominated by the Zhejiang Advisory Council, declined the seat citing the demands of his work at the Zhejiang Railway Company, and instead went to Guangdong to lecture on forming a parliament, hoping to launch a new national petition movement for parliament. In 1911, when the Clan Cabinet was established, Tang Shouqian and Zhang Jian sent a telegram to regent Zaifeng demanding reorganisation of the cabinet to include Han Chinese officials; Zaifeng refused, and Tang Shouqian became thoroughly disillusioned with the Qing government. On 27 June, Tang Shouqian encountered Zheng Xiaoxu in Hankou; a rift arose between them over Tang's advocacy of republicanism.

On 10 October 1911, the Wuchang uprising broke out. The following day Tang Shouqian arrived in Wuchang; witnessing the rising response from across the country, he set out on 13 October to return to Shanghai, and on 22 October made contact with revolutionary party members to prepare a provisional government. On 29 October, in an attempt to stabilise the situation in Zhejiang, the Qing government invited Tang Shouqian to take general charge of the Zhejiang militia forces; Tang Shouqian immediately consulted with the revolutionary party members in Hangzhou, including Ma Xulun, to establish a militia bureau in coordination with the Wuchang uprising, but this was aborted when Zengyu, the Zhejiang Governor, intercepted the communications. On 2 November, the revolutionary party in Hangzhou invited Tang Shouqian to Shanghai to ask him to serve as Military Governor of Zhejiang, hoping to inspire a larger national response. On 5 November, Hangzhou was liberated; early that morning, Shen Junru, Chen Fuxu, and Ma Xulun sent a telegram urging Tang Shouqian to return to Hangzhou quickly. Tang arrived at the Zhejiang Advisory Council venue in Hangzhou in the afternoon, shortly after 3 o'clock, and was immediately elected Military Governor of Zhejiang. At the time, the revolutionary army was negotiating with the Qing garrison troops of the Hangzhou Bannermen; the Hangzhou Bannermen commander Guilin, who was serving as negotiating representative, had been an ally of Tang Shouqian during the Zhejiang railway dispute, and thus as soon as Tang appeared both sides reached an agreement to cease hostilities. However, the following day the revolutionary party used the Military Governor's Office as cover to execute Guilin. (Note: According to "Race and Politics at the Turn from the Xinhai to the Renzi Year as Seen through the Death of Guilin": After Guilin's surrender, radical anti-Manchu factions within the revolutionary party, falsely claiming that Guilin's superior, Hangzhou Banner Commander Deji, had reported that Guilin was secretly stockpiling weapons and ammunition and poisoning the city's water supply in an attempt to resist the revolution, later found weapons and ammunition during a search and executed him on the spot. The case was overturned during the Northern Warlords period. When Tang Shouqian heard of Guilin's death, he complained bitterly to his friend Zhang Yuanji, accusing the revolutionary party of destroying his credibility and saying that as Military Governor he was everywhere squeezed out by the revolutionary party, like a puppet.) Tang Shouqian expressed dissatisfaction with these self-aggrandising and reckless revolutionary party members, submitted his resignation, but was persuaded to remain in office.

Tang Shouqian worried that "the great nation being newly founded, the coming days would be full of difficulties, while powerful neighbours to the east and west were eyeing it like tigers", fearing that imperialism would take advantage of the situation to carve up China; he therefore vigorously promoted the establishment of a national republican government, sending multiple telegrams to revolutionary leaders in the various provinces. On 11 November, Tang Shouqian invited Jiangsu Military Governor Cheng Dequan and Shanghai Military Governor Chen Qimei to jointly send a telegram to the whole nation proposing a conference of representatives from all provinces. On 9 November, Li Yuanhong telegraphed all provinces calling for national representatives to come to Hubei to organise a government; Tang Shouqian thus called a meeting on 16 November proposing that he himself go to Wuchang to determine national policy, but the meeting later resolved to send Zhang Yuanji instead. On 20 November, the joint conference of provincial representatives in Shanghai resolved to recognise the Wuchang government as the central government; Li Yuanhong also telegraphed the whole nation that day announcing cabinet appointments, and Tang Shouqian recommended Cheng Dequan as Minister of Internal Affairs, Zhang Taiyan as Minister of Education, Zhang Jian as Minister of Finance, Zhan Tianyou as Minister of Communications, Huang Xing as Minister of Military Affairs, and Wang Jingwei as Minister of Justice. On 2 December, the Jiangsu-Zhejiang allied forces captured Nanjing. The following day, Tang Shouqian arrived in Shanghai and met with representatives from Jiangsu, Shanghai, and Fujian—who had arrived earlier—to discuss establishing a provisional government, proposing to establish it in Nanjing; on the same day, the Wuchang side, under pressure from the fall of Hankou to Yuan Shikai, also resolved to make Nanjing the capital. On 4 December, the provincial representatives in Shanghai resolved to elect a Grand Marshal; the Shanghai and Jiangsu representatives strongly advocated Huang Xing as Grand Marshal and Li Yuanhong as Vice-Marshal. Tang Shouqian, dissatisfied that the Shanghai side was proceeding with elections behind Li Yuanhong's back after it had already been decided to recognise Wuchang as the central government, made an excuse to leave the meeting. On 17 December, Shanghai and Wuchang representatives gathered in Nanjing and elected Li Yuanhong as Grand Marshal and Huang Xing as Vice-Marshal.

Tang Shouqian insisted on a northern campaign during the Xinhai Revolution and strongly opposed the North–South negotiations. Only seven days after the liberation of Hangzhou, Zhejiang organised troops to march northward to attack Nanjing, which was defended by Zhang Xun. Tang Shouqian simultaneously wrote to Yuan Shikai urging him, for the sake of the nation, to support the republican government and not rely on military force; and also jointly agreed with Chen Qimei to use the assets of the Zhejiang Railway Company to support the northern campaign. On 11 December, just as peace talks were beginning, Tang Shouqian advised Li Yuanhong that if Yuan Shikai applied pressure there should be no weakness shown, and it would be better to abandon the talks and go directly to war; he subsequently also advised Wu Tingfang, Chen Qimei, and others not to trust Yuan Shikai, demanding that revolutionaries immediately launch a northern campaign. On 21 December, Sun Yat-sen arrived in Shanghai; the following day Tang Shouqian sent a telegram to South-North negotiating representative Wu Tingfang strongly opposing any compromise with Yuan Shikai and advocating a northern campaign to completely eliminate Yuan Shikai's forces. He still firmly believed at this time that Sun Yat-sen would also support a northern campaign, and thus undertook large-scale conscription and dispatched spies to investigate northern campaign routes. On 31 December, Yuan Shikai recalled negotiating representative Tang Shaoyi; Tang Shouqian telegraphed demanding an immediate northern campaign. On 1 January 1912, the Republic of China was founded. On 3 January, Tang Shouqian was appointed Minister of Communications but replied declining the appointment. On 14 January, the North-South representatives reached an agreement, extending the ceasefire by another fourteen days. On 15 January, Tang Shouqian stepped down as Military Governor of Zhejiang; before stepping down he also telegraphed Sun Yat-sen, cataloguing Yuan Shikai's acts of bad faith during the peace talks, and urgently calling for an immediate northern campaign. After stepping down, Tang Shouqian went to Shanghai and joined the Unity Party organised by Zhang Taiyan, Zhang Jian, and others as an adviser. On 9 February, Sun Yat-sen commissioned him to travel to the Nanyang region to raise public bonds; Tang Shouqian raised funds there for the Nanjing Provisional Government and the Zhe-Gan Railway. In May, Tang Shouqian returned to China to find that Sun Yat-sen had already transferred power to Yuan Shikai. After this, Tang Shouqian withdrew from political life.

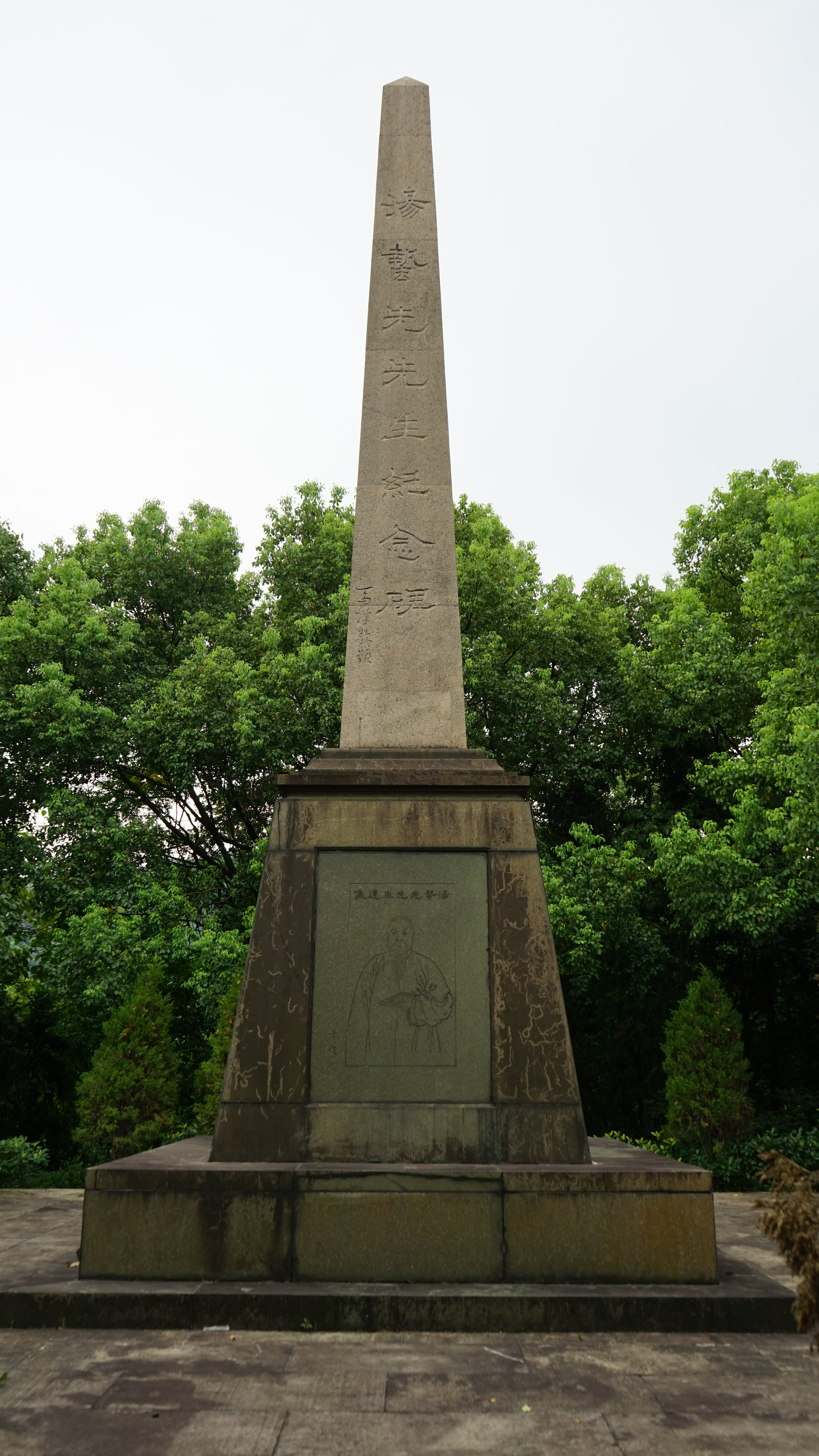
The Tang Zhexian Memorial Stele, located at the summit of Maoshan, Xiaoshan District

=== Later years ===
In June 1912, Tang Shouqian resumed his position as director-general of the Zhejiang Railway Company. The Beiyang government soon restored the late Qing policy of railway nationalisation; Tang Shouqian's Zhejiang Railway and Zhang Jian's Jiangsu Railway Company jointly resisted, and the two sides remained in deadlock—until the nationalisation of the Jiangsu Railway in 1914, when Tang Shouqian ultimately compromised under the persuasion of Xiong Xiling and Zhang Jian. Yuan Shikai awarded Tang Shouqian 200,000 yuan as a reward, which Tang donated in full to the construction of the Zhejiang Library. In 1913, on Tang Shouqian's recommendation, the Maxi Dam in his home township of Tianle was converted from a dam to a bridge, resolving a water management dispute that had persisted in Tianle Township since the Xuande era of the Ming dynasty—a period of nearly four centuries. To commemorate his contribution, the local people erected the Tang Zhexian Memorial Stele in May 1936. In 1915, Tang Shouqian went into seclusion in Linpu Town, Shaoxing County. (Note: Linpu Town at that time straddled the boundary between Xiaoshan and Shaoxing counties; Tang Shouqian's residence was within the jurisdiction of Tianle Middle Township, Shaoxing County. See the map of Linpu Town in Fig. 3 of "The Redirection of the Puyang River in the Ming Dynasty and the Water Management Transformation of the Xiao-Shao Plain".) That same year, Yuan Shikai declared himself emperor, and Tang Shouqian sent a public telegram in opposition. In 1916, when Tang Shouqian was sixty years old, he was already bedridden; in late June of the lunar calendar, he summoned his son-in-law Ma Yifu and dictated his Letter of Admonition to My Children, directing that his funeral be conducted simply, admonishing his children not to enter politics after his death, to farm and trade to repay the Zhejiang Railway loans, and expressing his wish that his son fulfil in his stead his aspiration to develop education. In January 1917, public assemblies were held across Zhejiang society protesting against the Beiyang government's dispatch of the warlord Yang Shande to govern Zhejiang; the organisers of the gathering used Tang Shouqian's name without authorisation as one of the conveners. Tang Shouqian issued a statement praising his fellow townspeople's love for their homeland but firmly demanded that his name be removed from the assembly to demonstrate his resolve to stay out of politics. On 6 June, he died of illness in Linpu, Shaoxing, leaving as his last words: "Competing for profit is the mark of a petty man; coveting fame is no mark of a worthy man either." After his death, the Beiyang government allocated 2,000 yuan for funeral arrangements; he was buried at Yangshan Ban, Zhisu Township, Tonglu County, Zhejiang (present-day Yangshan Fan Village, Hengcun Town, Tonglu County, Hangzhou).

== The Qiu Jin Case Controversy ==
For a long time, historians held that Tang Shouqian bore inescapable responsibility for the death of Qiu Jin. After the liberation of Hangzhou in 1911, revolutionary party member Wang Jinfa had opposed the nomination of Tang Shouqian as Military Governor of Zhejiang precisely on the grounds of Tang's alleged involvement in the Qiu Jin case. As early as 1908, Tao Chengzhang had mentioned Tang Shouqian in his Zhejiang Case Summary, claiming that after Shaoxing Prefect Guifu learned that Qiu Jin was about to launch an uprising he went to Hangzhou to seek reinforcements; upon arriving in Hangzhou he first met a prominent local gentry member surnamed Tang, who had long harboured animosity towards Qiu Jin and thus advised him to kill Qiu Jin as soon as possible; the Zhejiang Governor Zhang Zengyang also came to inquire, and the Tang gentleman said this kind of person should be killed right now or never. However, the archive Zhejiang's Full Handling of the Qiu Jin Revolutionary Case, published later, as well as correspondence among revolutionary party members, make no mention of Tang Shouqian; Tang Shouqian's involvement in the Qiu Jin case derives more from press rumours. Society at the time expressed displeasure that Tang Shouqian, as a prominent gentry member and fellow native of Qiu Jin, had not spoken out on her behalf; for example, Shanghai's Yue Hen (Shaoxing Hatred) published a satirical piece mock-imitating Tang Shouqian's self-confession of support for killing Qiu Jin, to criticise Tang Shouqian's inaction. After learning of the media accusations, Tang Shouqian responded publicly in the press, stating that at the time he had just lost his mother, was simultaneously occupied with Zhejiang Railway Company business, had never resided in his Shaoxing hometown, and had no contact with Shaoxing officials—and that the rumour of his involvement in the killing of Qiu Jin was pure fabrication.

== Achievements ==
Tang Shouqian was an early thinker of the Reform Movement, and was among the earliest thinkers in the late Qing reform movement to propose relocating the capital. In Dangerous Words, he elaborated on the threats posed by Russia and Japan on China's frontiers and maritime borders, pinning his hopes on using the relocation of the capital to reshape the political landscape dominated by conservative officials and create an environment for further reforms. In Dangerous Words, he also attacked the low efficiency of Self-Strengthening Movement enterprises such as the China Merchants' Steam Navigation Company, proposing replacing government-supervised merchant enterprises with privately owned enterprises in the economic sphere, and advocating the adoption of Western systems of government bonds, free trade, and intellectual property protection. Tang Shouqian believed that railways were the lifeblood of commerce, that railways were beneficial for consolidating national defence, that they should not be built by foreigners, and that China should build a national railway network as quickly as possible—ideas he put into practice during the Zhejiang railway dispute. Tang Shouqian also believed that education was the foundation of reform; criticising the imperial examination system for producing talents that lacked practical applicability and specific skills, he argued for reforming the education system to cultivate specialist talents and establish a modern educational system.

Beyond the late Qing reform movement and constitutionalist movement, Tang Shouqian also conducted profound research in the field of historical scholarship. From his youth, Tang Shouqian spent twenty years studying the Wenxian Tongkao, the Xu Wenxian Tongkao, and the Qing Chao Wenxian Tongkao—the three Tongkao works totalling 898 juan and approximately 12.94 million characters. Since these books were not available in his hometown, Tang Shouqian had to travel to Hangzhou to borrow and transcribe them, studying changes in Chinese institutions from the Han dynasty onwards as a reference for contemporary reform; he compiled and published the Santong Kao Jiyao. Yu Yue, Liu Jinzao, and others greatly praised this work, and contemporaries ranked Tang Shouqian alongside the historian Xia Zengyou as the "Two Pillars of Zhejiang". In 1901, Tang Shouqian published Xianfa Xinyi (New Meaning of the Constitution), drawing on his historical scholarship to unearth historical sources and propagating the ideas that "the constitution has always existed in China" and "it cannot be said that in ancient China there was not a single person who knew of constitutions, nor a single word spoken about them", thereby supporting the rising constitutionalist movement. In his later years, Tang Shouqian entrusted his son-in-law Ma Yifu with compiling the works of Zhu Zhiyu (Zhu Shunshui), jointly editing and publishing the Shunshui Yishu (Posthumous Works of Shunshui) (now renamed Zhu Shunshui Quanji, the Complete Works of Zhu Shunshui).

== Family ==
Tang Peien	Madam Ge
Tang Shouqian	Madam Ye	Tang Rensheng died in infancy	Tang Shouchong	Tang Shouming
Tang Xiaoji	Madam Kong	He Jingsheng	Tang Xiaohui	Jin Juying	Tang Xiaoyong died in infancy	Tang Renfang died in infancy	Tang Runsheng	Ma Yifu	Tang Runzhi	Jiang Shiying	Tang Linzhi	Tang Xiangzhi	Yu Jinhuang
