= 1909 Chinese provincial elections =

First Chinese provincial elections

Elections were held in 21 of Qing China's 22 provinces, excepting Xinjiang. Non-provinces are marked in white.

The Qing dynasty held its first set of provincial assembly elections from February to June 1909. Following a lengthy period of political turmoil which included the failure of the 1898 Hundred Days' Reform and the 1899–1901 Boxer Rebellion, the constitutionalist movement gained approval from the imperial court and Empress Dowager Cixi. Seeing local self-governance as a first step towards constitutionalism, in 1907 the Qing Government approved the creation of provincial assemblies. The following year, an indirect election system was outlined to fill these assemblies. They were held in 21 of the country's 22 provinces; Xinjiang elections were postponed due to low rates of literacy in Chinese. Suffrage and candidacy was limited to a small population of wealthy men, most of whom were members of the scholar-gentry. Public attitudes towards the elections were generally apathetic, and corruption, fraud, and vote buying were common across the country. Turnout greatly varied between provinces and regions, but was generally low.

The elected provincial assemblies were composed largely of constitutionalists, who were often divided between progressive and conservative wings. Some assemblymen were clandestine members of the revolutionary organization Tongmenghui. The assemblies agitated for a variety of economic and political reforms, which brought them into conflict with the provincial governors, who held veto power over the bodies. The assemblies participated in parliamentary elections, electing half of the members of the National Assembly. Before another set of elections could be held, the Qing dynasty collapsed in the 1911 Revolution and the Republic of China was founded. The first provincial elections under the new government were held in 1912.

== Background ==
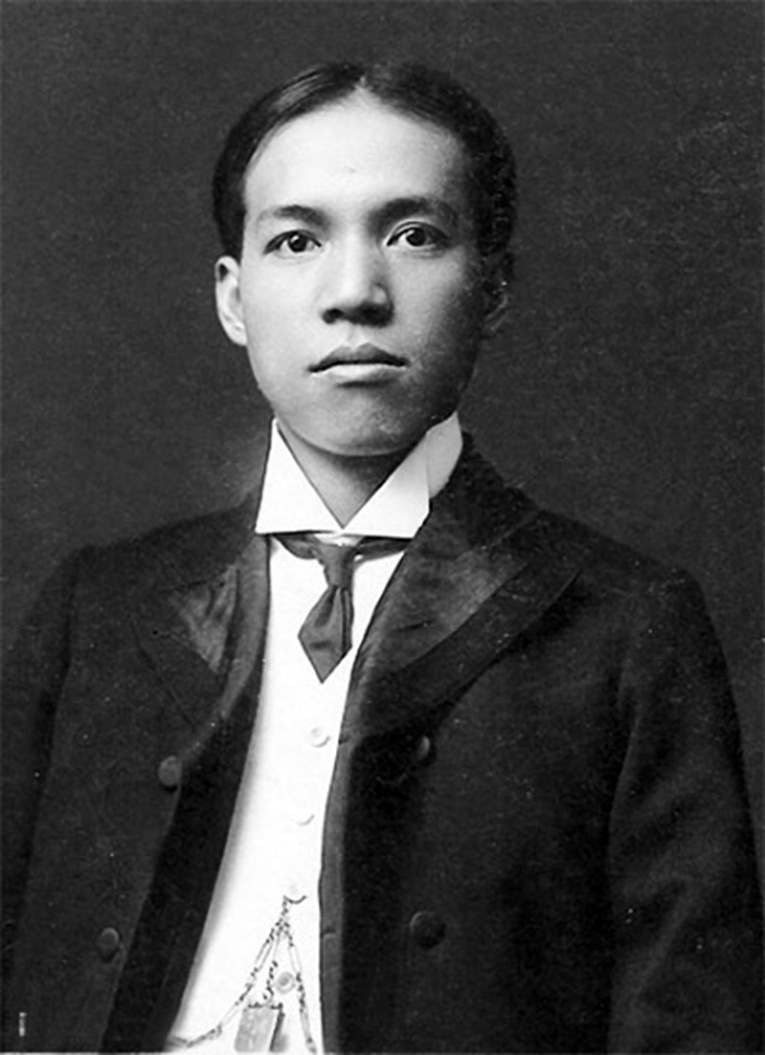
Constitutionalist leader Liang Qichao, c. 1905

Since the Song dynasty (960–1279), scholars were appointed to positions in the imperial Chinese bureaucracy through the imperial examination system. This system was carried through to the late Qing dynasty, although it had come under increasing intellectual opposition during the late 19th century as corrupt and ineffective. As it entered the 20th century, the Qing empire was in social and political turmoil, facing a series of defeats by the Western powers. Despite the repression of the Hundred Days' Reform in 1898, the constitutionalist movement continued to advocate for the creation of a constitutional government in lieu of Qing absolutism. The writer Liang Qichao emerged as the movement's most influential leader.

The de facto head of state Empress Dowager Cixi, previously opposed to the reform movement, had begun to grow sympathetic in the wake of China's humiliation in the Boxer Rebellion and the upset victory of the constitutionalist Empire of Japan in the Russo-Japanese War. The administrative, bureaucratic, and judicial systems were the first major targets for reform; redundant and archaic offices were abolished, the functions of the Six Boards (powerful imperial government agencies) were transferred to a new set of civil ministries, and the three northeastern provinces were integrated into the administrative framework of the other provinces. In June 1905, prominent imperial officials Yuan Shikai, Zhang Zhidong, and Zhou Fu jointly submitted a call for the creation of a constitutional monarchy.

The Qing government reduced the frequency of the imperial exams and began to promote a Western-style education system; when this met resistance by local gentry, the examination system was abolished in 1905. The government initially intended to replace the imperial examinations with a new form of civil service exam; however, little progress was made in its creation. Instead, the central government began to pursue elections as an alternative to examinations. Although new entries into the gentry ended with the examination system, the class still held immense influence. Including their family members, slightly under two percent of the population were members of the gentry by the late 19th century. Although the majority had reached this status through the examination system, an increasing number had purchased gentry status from the central government, at a cost which had been dramatically lowered in the decades following the Taiping Rebellion.

=== Creation of provincial assemblies ===
Proposals for local and provincial assemblies were raised following the end of the Hundred Days' Reform. In the first few years of the 1900s, reformist and revolutionary thinkers such as Sun Yat-sen, Ho Kai, and Kang Youwei began to advocate for such assemblies, citing both Western systems of local government and the traditional governance system of fengjian. (Note: Fengjian describes a variety of Chinese governing principles and systems that were analogized to European feudalism by late Qing and Republican intellectuals.) As the central government began to embrace the constitutional movement, reformist officials began to advocate for the establishment of local self-governance as a preliminary step towards a constitutional government.

Upon the recommendation of a 1906 state committee headed by Prince Zaifeng, Cixi issued an edict in support of a constitution and national legislature. The next year, the Grand Council established the Constitutional Commission to begin a twelve-year constitutional reform process, inspired by the Japanese Meiji Restoration and constitution. Under the supervision of Yuan Shikai, the Tianjin County Council held the first Western-style elections in Chinese history in August 1907. Following a proposal by Yuan in July, on 19 October, the Constitutional Commission received imperial assent to organize provincial assemblies (谘议局; Zīyìjú), (Note: While generally translated "provincial assembly" the name ziyiju carries the connotation of a temporary consultative council rather than provincial legislatures (Chinese: 省議會; pinyin: Shěng yìhuì). Historian Roger Thompson instead labels them "provincial consultative bureaus".) in preparation for the establishment of the National Assembly (資政院; Zīzhèngyuàn) and proper provincial legislatures. Following this, various provinces (including Jiangsu, Guangdong, Guangxi, and Fengtian) created unelected provincial assemblies with appointees from the local gentry.

== Procedures and preparations ==
In July 1908, the central court produced regulations for the implementation of provincial assemblies and their elections. The "Regulations for Provincial Assembly Elections" was a 115-clause document which established the electoral processes. The provincial assembly elections were indirect elections via an electoral college; voters would vote on a slate of electors, who would in turn elect the provincial assemblymen. In addition to their provincial duties, these assemblymen would elect the members of the National Assembly in a separate election later in the year.

Only men were allowed to participate in the election. Both voters and elector candidates were subject to the same set of requirements, beyond a minimum age of 25 for voters and 30 for electors. Eligible men were required to have either taught at above the primary level for at least three years, graduated from a secondary school, held the imperial examination rank of gongsheng (貢生) or higher, held a post at or above the seventh rank of the civil service or the fifth rank of the military, or had wealth (either through a business or land holdings) exceeding 5,000 yuan. (Note: In 1912, China's per capita gross domestic product (GDP) was 52.26 yuan. A metric ton of rice in this period cost around 102 yuan, while a ton of wheat cost 71.4.) Criminals, opium users, police officers, students, priests, and those with family members in disreputable careers were barred from voting or standing as candidates. If a voter was not native to their province, they were required to have resided there for over ten years, and have wealth exceeding 10,000 yuan. These regulations resulted in the overwhelming majority of the population being ineligible to vote.

Following the promulgation of these regulations, preparatory offices were formed in each province; They were staffed by a mix of existing officials and the scholar-gentry. Officials were often forced to give concessions to local gentry — in the form of leadership positions within the preparatory offices — in order to guarantee cooperation. Some of the preparatory offices were tightly controlled by provincial officials, while others (such as Guangdong's) were independent and hostile to the provincial government.

Electoral divisions followed provincial administrative subdivisions of prefectures, counties, and districts. Seats were allotted to these according to the quota of students enrolled at prefecture, department, and county schools. Manchu bannermen (hereditary military positions for Manchu officials) were also allocated seats. The central government initially planned twenty-three provincial assemblies, one for each province, with Jiangsu divided into a southern assembly in Suzhou and a northern assembly in Nanjing. The two Jiangsu assemblies were merged due to local pressure, while the assembly for Xinjiang was postponed due to extremely low rates of literacy in Chinese. (Note: The dominant language among Xinjiang's Turkic elite was Turki, while Mongol was often used in communication with the Qing government.) Elections were not held in Tibet, the Kokonur (modern Qinghai), and Mongolia, as they were not provinces, instead administered under the Lifan Bu (理藩部, a state agency which succeeded the Lifan Yuan).

== Campaign ==
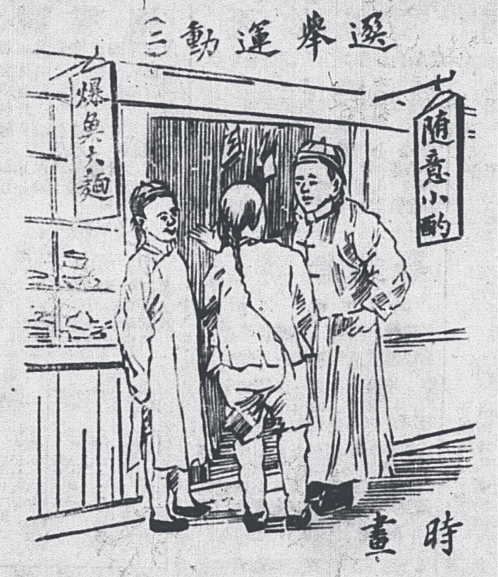
Cartoon of a candidate offering a meal to voters in Jiangsu, from the Shanghai Shibao

The public was generally apathetic towards the elections. Only one voting station existed in each electoral district, often many miles apart. Citizens who were eligible through their wealth were often hesitant to give their property value to register, fearing that they would come under scrutiny from tax collectors. Preparatory office officials emphasized that the voter census would not be a precursor to new taxation. In Shandong, Shanxi, and Yunnan, lecturers were sent to inform potential voters of the election and solicit their participation. Information about the reforms was also transmitted through periodicals, distributed to remote regions.

Registration for the elections took about six months. As the infant Xuantong Emperor had ascended to the throne after voter registration had begun, many registered voters were listed with names violating the new name taboo by having names which shared characters with the emperor's name. In southern Jiangsu, those who could not be contacted to change their names in time had their names changed by the election preparatory office.

Corruption, election fraud, and vote buying were frequent across the country. Some voters in Yangzhou, Jiangsu, were found to have voted by proxy, while some ineligible voters were allowed to cast ballots in Anhui. Votes cast in Ansu, Zhili, were decided by village brawls. In Houguan County, Fujian, the results of two districts were voided due to suspicious polling booth supervision. In contrast, the North China Herald reported a relatively well-organized election in Shanxi.

== Results ==
In most provinces, turnout was low even among the eligible population. Out of 21,073 registered voters in Shuntian Prefecture (containing Beijing), only a little over 1,500 votes were cast. Somewhere between 40–70% of eligible voters in Jiangsu participated; in Fujian, turnout was as high as 40% in the cities, while ranging from 10–20% in the rural countryside. Foreign eyewitnesses reported very low enthusiasm and participation within much of the country.

=== Assembly composition ===
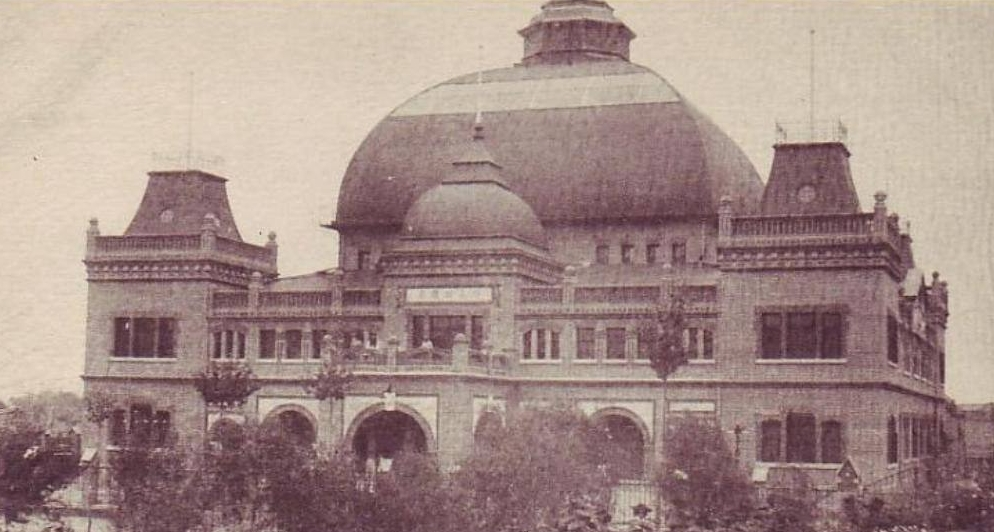
The Zhili Provincial Assembly hall in Tianjin

Those elected to the assemblies were mostly scholar-gentry, especially those with advanced degrees. Within five assemblies with known member compositions, a slight majority of members were higher-ranking gentry, with only about 10% from non-gentry backgrounds. A small but prominent percentage of members had studied outside of China‚ mainly in Japan; the Sichuan assembly had the most Japanese-educated assembly members. The average age of the elected candidates was 41.

The vast majority of members elected were constitutionalists. Although they formed a broad opposition bloc to revolutionary groups such as the Tongmenghui, they were not a unified faction; the Shandong and Guizhou assemblies quickly fell into factional conflict between conservative and progressive wings. Many of the progressive constitutionalists were younger and had studied abroad. A small fraction of the assemblymen were secretly affiliated with the Tongmenghui; although precise figures and membership is unknown, at least four members of the Sichuan assembly were Tongmenghui members, as well as Shaanxi assembly vice-chairman Guo Xiren.

1909 provincial assembly elections
Province	Voters	% of pop.	Seats	Assembly chairman
Fengtian	52,679	0.43%	50	Wu Jinglian
Zhili	162,585	0.62%	140	Yan Fengge
Jiangxi (Note: Jiangxi, Henan, and Yunnan figures are estimates by Min Tu-ki)	120,000	? (Note: Based off the 1910 Chinese census, statistician Walter F. Willcox estimated that Jiangxi had 15,479,000 people. Combined with Min's estimates, this would mean that 0.82% of the population voted.)	93	Xie Yuanhan
Hubei	113,233	0.38%	80	Tang Hualong
Henan	90,527	? (Note: Based off the 1910 Chinese census, statistician Walter F. Willcox estimated that Henan had 20,977,000 people. Combined with Min's estimates, this would mean that 0.43% of the population voted.)	96	Du Yan
Gansu	9,249	0.19%	43	Zhang Linyan
Guangxi	40,284	0.50%	57	Chen Shuxun
Jilin	15,362	0.27%	30	Qingkang
Jiangsu	162,472	0.50%	121	Chang Jian
Zhejiang	90,275	0.42%	114	Chen Fuchen
Hunan	100,487	0.36%	82	Tan Yankai
Shanxi	53,669	0.43%	86	Liang Shanji
Sichuan	191,500	0.39%	105	Pu Dianjun
Yunnan	47,000	? (Note: Based off the 1910 Chinese census, statistician Walter F. Willcox estimated that Yunnan had 7,076,000 people. Combined with Min's estimates, this would mean that 0.66% of the population voted.)	68	Zhang Weicong
Heilongjiang	4,652	0.23%	30	Wang Heming
Anhui	77,902	0.48%	83	Fang Lizhong
Fujian	50,034	0.39%	72	Gao Dengli
Shandong	119,549	0.38%	100	Yang Yusi
Shaanxi	29,055	0.29%	63	Wang Hengjin
Guangdong	141,558	0.44%	91	Yi Xueqing
Guizhou	42,526	0.42%	39	Yo Jiazao
Total	aprox. 1.7 million	0.42%	1,643	—N/a

== Aftermath ==
The provincial assemblies convened on 14 October 1909. Contemporary political and press responses were favorable to the new assemblies. The conservative Viceroy of Liangguang, Zhang Renjun, was initially opposed to the creation of the local assemblies, but described their membership as well-spoken and knowledgeable about the problems facing the country. A North China Herald account described the members of the Shanxi provincial assembly as peaceful and intelligent.

The assemblies' powers were primarily consultative. The provincial governors (Note: Governors (巡撫; xúnfǔ) were appointed by the emperor. They were under the jurisdiction of the imperially-appointed viceroy or governor-general (總督; zǒngdū), who oversaw one to three governors.) held veto power over the assemblies, almost immediately leading to political conflict between the two. Despite this, the assemblies persistently agitated for political reform and the creation of a national parliament. Within the first year of their operation, they passed a large volume of bills, proposals, and petitions, generally relating to economic development. In 1910, the provincial assemblies elected half of the members of the National Assembly, similarly an advisory council, with the other half of the assembly appointed by the imperial court.

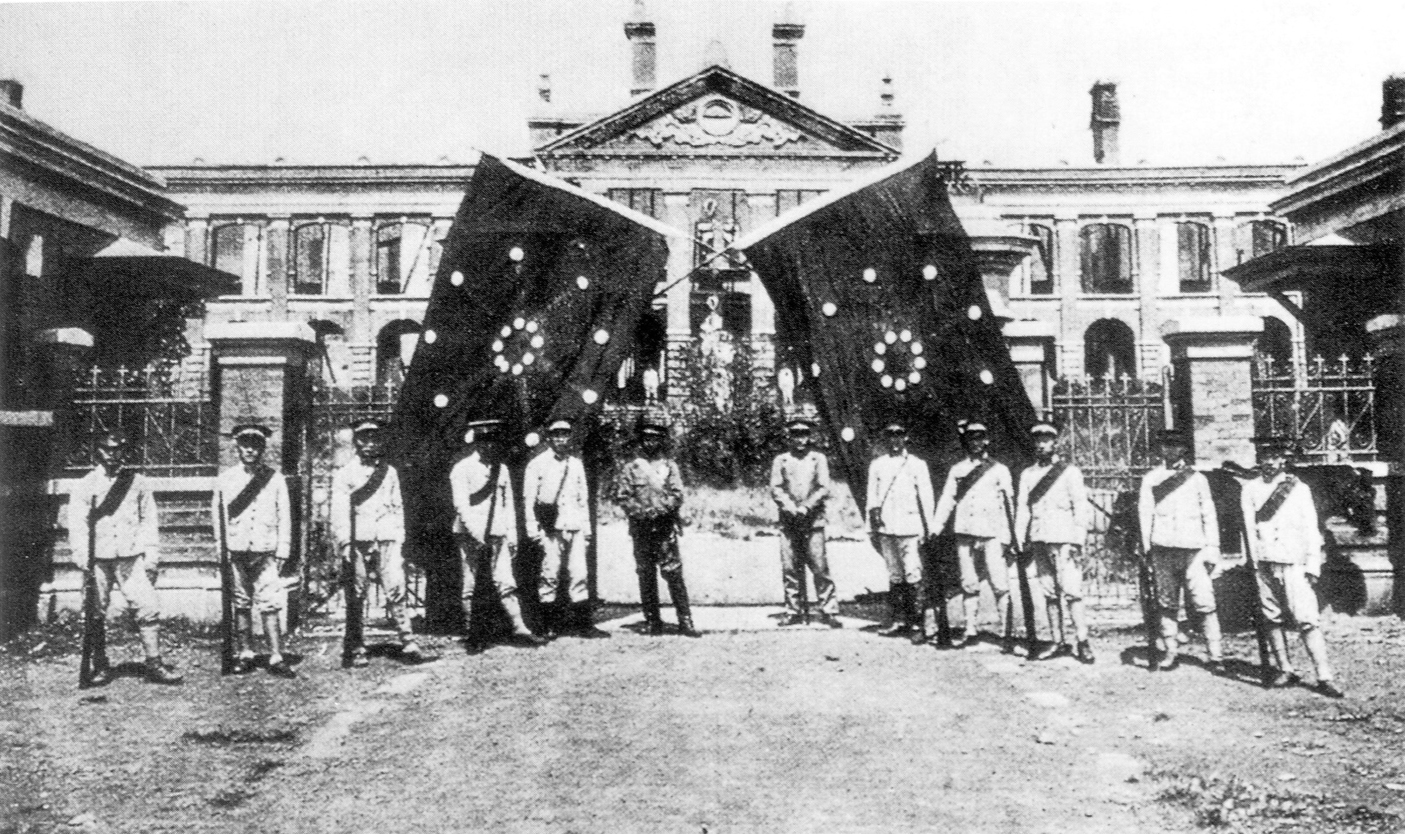
The Wuchang Uprising and 1911 Revolution saw the collapse of the Qing Dynasty and the creation of the Republic of China.

Before another set of provincial elections could be held, the 1911 Wuchang Uprising led to an anti-Qing revolutionary movement spreading across much of China. The imperial government soon responded with the Shijiu Xintiao (十九信條), a further series of political reforms with some inspiration from the British constitutional system; this did little to curb unrest, and even many constitutionalists joined the revolutionaries. The assemblies helped organize and legitimize provincial military governments to weaken Qing control. Yuan Shikai, the leader of the Qing armies, began to collaborate with the revolutionaries. The Republic of China was declared on 1 January 1912, and the emperor was soon forced to abdicate. The new republic created its own national and provincial assemblies. New provincial assembly elections were held in 1912, similarly plagued by corruption. Chung Po-yee, a member of both the 1909 and 1912 assemblies, described both elections as producing "gentlemanly, modest, and agreeable" assemblymen. The new provincial assemblies were dismantled under Yuan Shikai's regime in the mid-1910s. Further provincial elections, fraudulently controlled by the Anfu Club political clique, were held in 1918.

== See also ==
- 1912–13 Chinese National Assembly election
