= 1909 Chinese parliamentary election =

First Qing dynasty election

- September – October 1909

196 seats (of 200 seats) to the Advisory Council 101 seats needed for a majority
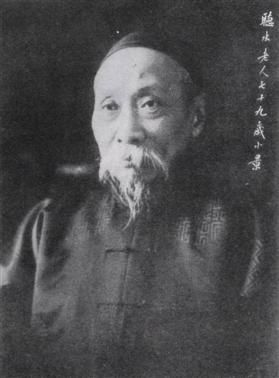

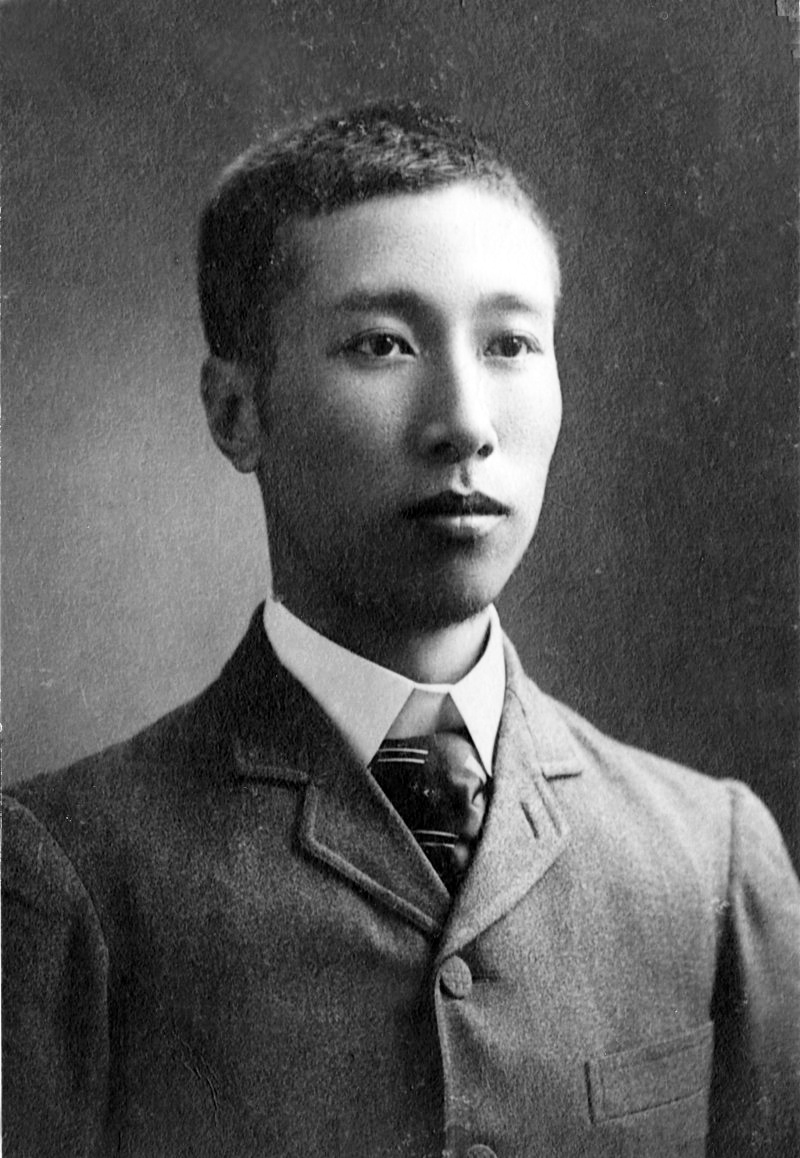

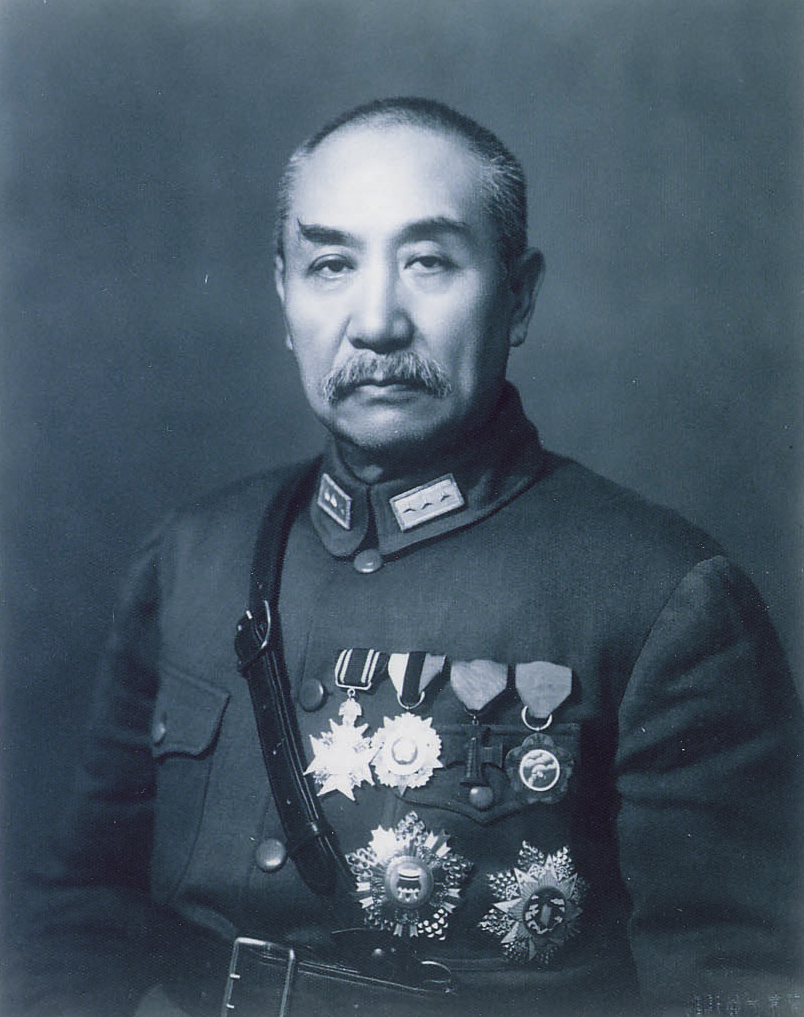

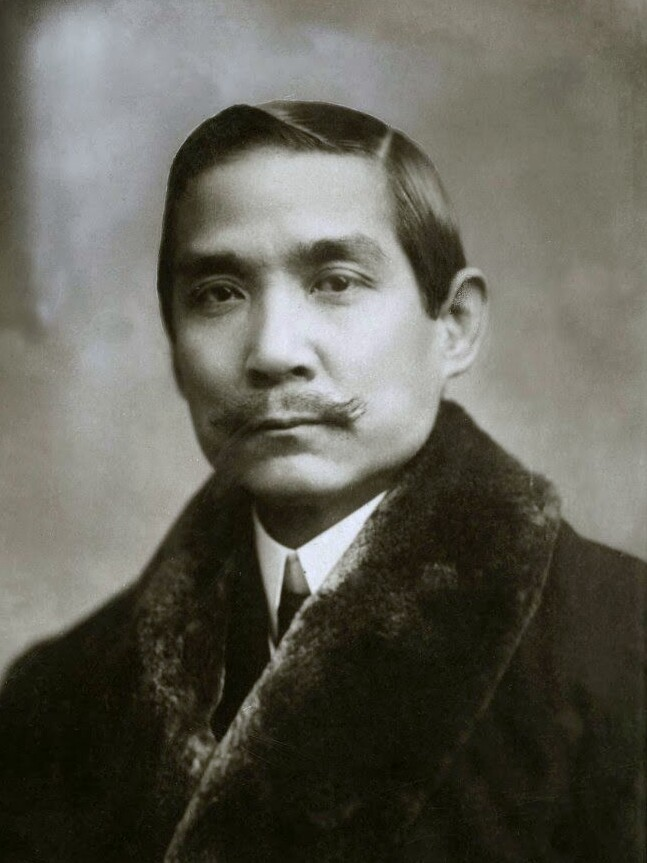

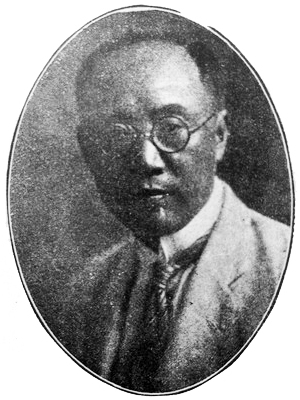

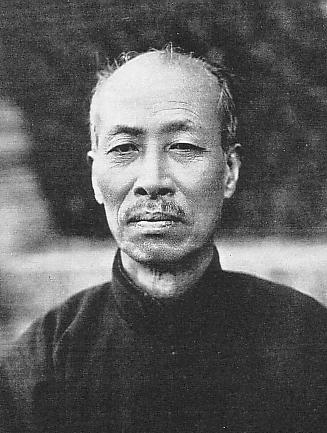
	First party	Second party	Third party
Leader	Chen Baochen	Yang Du	Yan Xishan
Party	Continuous Constitutionalism	CERA	Xinhai Club
Alliance	Constitutionalists	Constitutionalists	Constitutionalists
Leader's seat	Scholars (Appointed)	Did not stand	Did not stand
Elected seats	38	10	4
Appointed seats	37	0	7
	Fourth party	Fifth party	Sixth party
Leader	Sun Yat-sen	Wang Rongbao	Zheng Xiaoxu
Party	Tongmenghui	Political Science Club	Preparative Constitutionalism
Alliance	Revolutionaries	Constitutionalists	Constitutionalists
Leader's seat	Did not stand	Government Officials (Appointed)	Did not stand
Elected seats	4	1	3
Appointed seats	3	4	2
- Constitutionalist majority Independent majority Divided between constitutionalists and independents Divided between constitutionalists and revolutionaries No election

The 1909 Chinese parliamentary election was an indirect election to the first imperial Advisory Council, a preparatory body of the parliament created under the constitutional reform bought by the late Qing dynasty. It was seen as the first popular election in Chinese history.

Originally 100 members, half of the seats in the council were to be elected by the members of the Provincial Consultative Assemblies, while the other half were appointed by the Emperor. Due to the fact the Provincial Consultative Assembly had not been set up in Sinkiang, the seats were reduced to 98.

Translations with bracketed Chinese text are for reference only.

== Electoral system ==
The candidates were indirectly elected by members of Consultative Assembly in provinces. The number of candidate each electorate shall vote for was double the delegated seats. Amongst all the supported candidates, half of them would be chosen by the governor as elected members. Appointed members included a certain degree of election features as there were considerable size of eligible members.

== Constituencies ==
The new Advisory Council only consisted of 196 members, instead of 200 as planned, as Consultative Assembly was not established in Sinkiang, and the number of appointed members shrank to 98 to achieve the balance.

Elected members are as follows:

Province	Seats	Province	Seats
Zhili	9	Shanxi	5
Zhejiang	7	Fujian	4
Jiangsu	7	Shaanxi	4
Jiangxi	6	Yunnan	4
Shandong	6	Fengtian	3
Sichuan	6	Gansu	3
Anhui	5	Guangxi	3
Henan	5	Heilongjiang	2
Hubei	5	Jilin	2
Hunan	5	Guizhou	2
Guangdong	5	Xinjiang	—N/a

Appointed members are as follows:

Constituency	Seats	Constituency	Seats
Government Officials (各部院衙門官)	32	Scholars (碩學通儒)	10
Princes of Imperial Family (宗室王公世爵)	14	Large Taxpayers (納稅多額)	10
Princes of Feudatories (外藩王公世爵)	14	Descendants of Emperor (宗室覺羅)	6
Nobility of Manchu and Han (滿漢世爵)	12		

== Result ==
The constitutionalists, who advocated constitutional monarchy in Qing, secured a majority in the Advisory Council. The revolutionaries on the other hand, despite being banned by the authorities, won a few seats. The party membership is only estimation as the political party system was immature at the time. Some members resigned during the session and the vacancies were filled according to the precedence list, which is not reflected here.

Political party	Elected	Appointed	Total
Continuous Constitutionalism Association (憲政維持進行會)	38	37	75
Xinhai Club (辛亥俱樂部)	4	7	11
Chinese Empire Reform Association	10	0	10
Political Science Club (政學會)	1	4	5
Preparative Constitutionalism Association (預備立憲公會)	3	2	5
Brotherhood of Petition for Parliament (國會請願同志會)	5	0	5
Joint Association of Provincial Consultative Assemblies (各省諮議局聯合會)	3	0	3
Guangdong Autonomous Chamber of Commerce (粵商自治會)	1	0	1
Preparative Constitutionalism Association of Guizhou (貴州憲政預備會)	1	0	1
Constitutionalists total	66	50	116
Tongmenghui	4	3	7
Association for Guizhou Autonomy (貴州自治學社)	1	0	1
Revolutionaries total	5	3	8
Independents	27	45	72
Vacant	2	2	4
Total	100	100	200

=== Detailed results ===
	Zhili	Zhejiang	Jiangsu	Jiangxi	Shandong	Sichuan	Anhui	Henan	Hunan	Shanxi	Yunnan
Continuous Constitutionalism Association	6	1	4	2	2	3	1	2			1
Chinese Empire Reform Association	2	2	2				1			2	
Xinhai Club		1							2		1
Political Science Club			1								
Preparative Constitutionalism Association	1	1		1							
Brotherhood of Petition for Parliament				1			1	1		1	1
Joint Association of Provincial Consultative Assemblies					1	2					
Tongmenghui		1			2				0	1	
Independents		1		2	1	1	2	2	3	1	1
Total	9	7	7	6	6	6	5	5	5	5	4

	Hubei	Guangdong	Fujian	Shaanxi	Fengtian	Gansu	Guangxi	Guizhou	Heilongjiang	Jilin
Continuous Constitutionalism Association	4		4	2	1	3				2
Chinese Empire Reform Association							1			
Guangdong Autonomous Chamber of Commerce		1								
Preparative Constitutionalism Association of Guizhou								1		
Association for Guizhou Autonomy								1		
Independents	1	4		2	2		2		2	
Total	5	5	4	4	3	3	3	2	2	2

	Officials	Imperial Prince	Feudatory Prince	Nobility	Scholars	Taxpayers	Emperor's Descendants
Continuous Constitutionalism Association	14	6		3	6	6	3
Xinhai Club	6						
Political Science Club	2		1		1		
Preparative Constitutionalism Association					2		
Tongmenghui	1					2	
Independents	9	8	13	9	1	2	3
Total	32	14	14	12	10	10	6

== See also ==
- Democracy in China
- Preparative Constitutionalism
- 1909 Chinese provincial elections
