= Parliament of China (disambiguation) =

The parliament of China, officially the People's Republic of China is the unicameral National People's Congress.

The parliament of China may also refer to:

- The Advisory Council (Qing dynasty) (1910–1912) of the Qing dynasty
- The National Assembly (Beiyang government) (1913–1925) of the Beiyang government during the Republic of China (1912–1949).
- The National Assembly (Republic of China), Legislative Yuan and Control Yuan of the government of the Republic of China
