= Mutual Defense Pact of the Southeastern Provinces =

1900 agreement in China

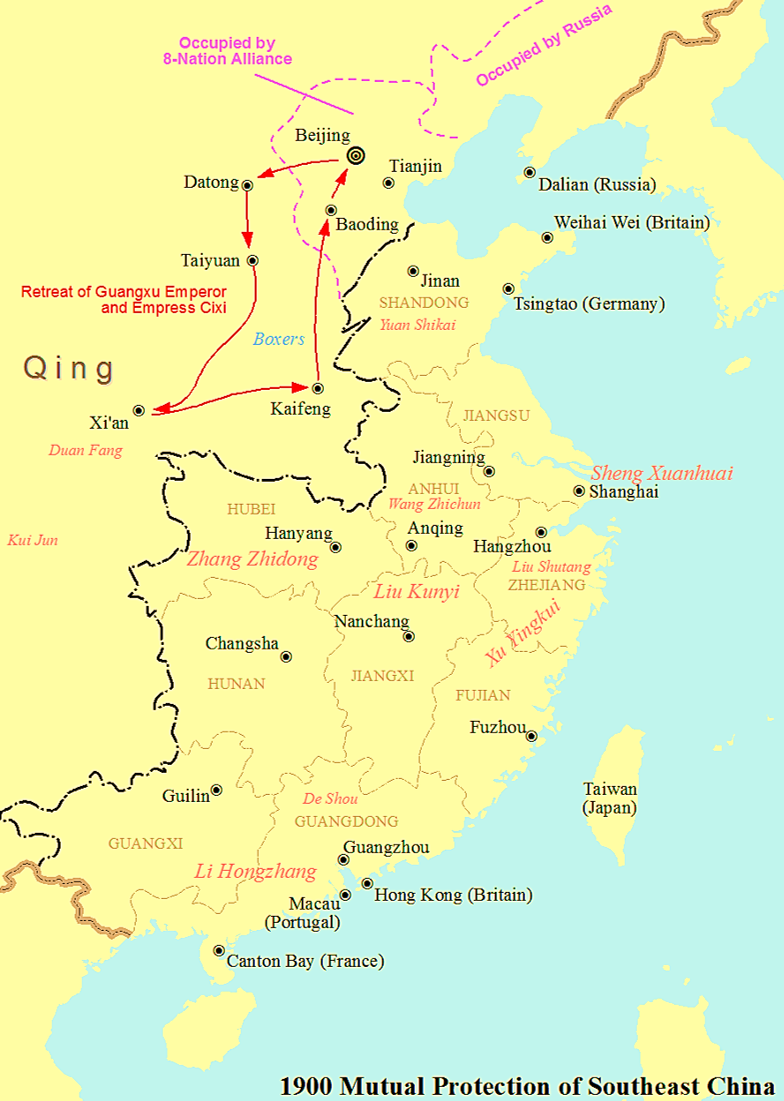
Map of Mutual Defense Pact of the Southeastern Provinces in 1900

The Mutual Defense Pact of the Southeastern Provinces (traditional Chinese: 東南互保; simplified Chinese: 东南互保; pinyin: Dōngnán Hùbǎo) was an agreement reached in the summer of 1900 during the Boxer Rebellion by Qing dynasty governors of the provinces in southern, eastern and central China when the Eight-Nation Alliance invaded northern China. The governors, including Li Hongzhang (governor-general of Guangdong, Guangxi), Xu Yingkui (governor-general of Fujian, Zhejiang), Liu Kunyi (governor-general of Jiangsu, Anhui, Jiangxi), Zhang Zhidong (governor-general of Hubei, Hunan) and Yuan Shikai (provincial governor of Shandong), refused to carry out the imperial decree promulgated by the Qing imperial court to declare war on 11 foreign states, with the aim of preserving peace in their own provinces.

Some other Han-majority provincial authorities, such as the governor-general of Sichuan and the provincial governor of Shaanxi, did not formally join the mutual protection agreement but similarly disobeyed the imperial edict. Thus, for the first time, the vast majority of Han regional authorities refused to aid the Qing court. For much of the conflict, the main forces fighting for the Qing court (alongside the Boxers) were the Manchu Hushenying, the Manchu Peking Field Force and three of five divisions of the Qing court's most modernized Wuwei Corps (including its Manchu division and Muslim Gansu division), but Yuan Shikai commanded the other two divisions into Shandong and actively used them to suppress the Boxers, in open defiance of the Qing court. In Manchuria, large groups of Han bandits named Honghuzi ("Red Beards") also actively fought alongside Manchu banners, mostly as a response to the separate Russian invasion that had widespread atrocities against Manchus and Daurs such as the 1900 Amur anti-Chinese pogroms.

== Background ==
In 1895, China had lost the war against Japan in the First Sino-Japanese War. However, the Western Triple Intervention by France, the German Empire and the Russian Empire, led by the latter in the interests of preserving her sphere of interests in northeastern China, forced Japan to withdraw from profiting from many of her advantages gained by military victory, which were then seized upon by the Powers themselves. In the succeeding “Scramble for China”, Western powers claimed a succession of treaty ports and economic concessions from China in 1897-98, leading in turn to a rise in both urban nationalist sentiment but also grassroots xenophobic reactionary conservatism, which consolidated itself around a mystic secret society called the Boxers, supported by the Imperial Court of Dowager Empress Cixi.

In 1899 and 1900 there was a surge in xenophobic incidents directed against foreigners in northern China, as well as against Chinese perceived to be working for or with foreigners, such as Chinese Christian converts and employees of foreign-owned enterprises like railways. Symbols of foreign technology like railways and telegraph poles were also attacked, but it was not until June 1900 that a showdown with the foreign legations was provoked by the Imperial Court after the assassination of a German diplomat by the Boxers. After the order to leave was ignored by many in the legations, they were subjected to a siege of the Boxers supported by certain units of the Chinese Imperial Army, like the Muslim Kansu Braves, in a siege that lasted 55 days until the relief expedition of the Eight-Nation Alliance arrived.

== Course ==
Even before the declaration of war by the Qing court in 1900, governors of the provinces in Eastern and Southern China had discussed ways to preserve peace in their territories, primarily against an invasion by foreign powers. Among them were Liu Kunyi (Viceroy of Liangjiang), Zhang Zhidong (Viceroy of Huguang) and Li Hongzhang (Viceroy of Liangguang). The governors had also concluded that if Peking were to fall and the status of the Emperor and the Empress Dowager were unknown, a presidential republic would be declared, and Li Hongzhang would be the first president of China.

Zhang Zhidong told Everard Fraser, the Hankou-based British consul general that he despised Manchus so that the Eight Nation Alliance would not occupy other parts of China like his provinces under the Mutual Defense Pact of the Southeastern Provinces.

On 21 June 1900, the Empress Dowager issued the Imperial Decree of declaration of war against foreign powers on behalf of the Emperor, against 11 countries simultaneously: Russian Empire, United States, United Kingdom, Japan, France, German Empire, Italy, Spain, Austria-Hungary, Belgium, and the Netherlands. The minister for telegraphy, Sheng Xuanhuai, managed to stop the Imperial Decree and another decree to gather the Boxers from going public. Instead, the decrees were shown only to the governors, together with a telegram instructing them not to follow the imperial order. Li Hongzhang, Yuan Shikai and other viceroys openly rejected the Dowager's call to stage military actions against the foreign powers. Li Hongzhang, in particular, issued a telegram: 'This is a false decree. The Provinces of Guangdong and Guangxi will not obey'. Zhang Zhidong tabled again the proposal to establish a Chinese Republic with Li Hongzhang as the president in the event that the Imperial Court fell, along with Peking.

The governors asked the foreign powers not to invade their provinces no matter what happened to the North (i.e. Peking, Hebei and Shanxi); and conveyed this order to their subordinates: "Belligerent mobs should not be used; heresy and mysticism should not be trusted; armed conflicts should not be initiated."

Li Hongzhang used the Siege of the International Legations as a political weapon against his rivals in Beijing since he controlled the Chinese telegraph service. He exaggerated and lied, claiming that Imperial forces committed atrocities and murder upon the foreigners and exterminated all of them. The information was sent to the Western world. He aimed to infuriate the Europeans against the Imperial forces in Beijing and succeeded in spreading massive amounts of false information to the West. The false information spread by Li played a part in the massive atrocities that the foreigners later committed upon Manchu and Mongol bannermen in Beijing. For refusing to obey the Qing government's orders and not sending his own troops to help the Imperial army at all during the Boxer Rebellion, Li Hongzhang was praised by Westerners.

Yuan Shikai and Zhang Zhidong ignored Empress Dowager Cixi's declaration of war against the foreign powers and continued to suppress the Boxers. In addition to not fighting the Eight-Nation Alliance and to suppressing the Boxers in Shandong, Yuan and his army (the Right Division) also helped the Eight-Nation Alliance suppress the Boxers after the Alliance captured Beijing in August 1900. Yuan Shikai's forces massacred tens of thousands of people in their anti-Boxer campaign in Zhili Province. Yuan operated out of Baoding during the campaign, which ended in 1902.

== Significance ==
This event marked the first time that Han officials openly refused to obey orders from the Manchu court (Li Hongzhang, Liu Kunyi, Zhang Zhidong were all Han Chinese). From the perspective of the provinces, the event successfully prevented war and turmoil from affecting their territories. After the Eight Power Expedition, the local authorities saw the need to enhance local military strength to defend themselves against foreign invasions. When the Qing court collapsed and imperial officials were expelled upon the Xinhai revolution, the militarily-powerful regional authorities led to the Warlord Era.

From the perspective of the Qing court, the Eight Power Expedition, together with the series of military confrontations made with foreign powers, hurt national pride. In particular, the event showed how prominent regionalism had become since local authorities refused to abide by the imperial order. These led to the fear of dismemberment of the state. Hence, the government made attempts to recentralise power and win back support. For example, it proposed to prepare for a constitution, a royal cabinet, together with a series of reforms. However, those actions were mainly seen as insincere as their chief intent was to prolong the Manchu rule, instead of strengthening China and sharing power with other ethnicities. The reforms did little to save the Qing court, and imperial rule collapsed after the 1911 Revolution.

In the ending days of the dynasty, the Qing court made a final attempt to re-appoint Yuan Shikai, who was politically exiled in 1908-1911 for participating role in the mutual protection agreement. Yuan Shikai eventually agreed to take control of the new modernized imperial Beiyang Army and made a few successful expeditions against the southern revolutionaries; however, he almost immediately entered negotiations with the revolutionaries and eventually forced the abdication of the Qing court.

== See also ==
- Eight-Nation Alliance
