= Nineteen Articles =

- Promulgated on: 3 November 1911
- Type: Constitutional document
- Country: China

Nineteen Articles
- Traditional Chinese: 十九信條
- Simplified Chinese: 十九信条
Transcriptions
Standard Mandarin
- Hanyu Pinyin: shí jiǔ xìn tiáo

Alternative Chinese name
- Traditional Chinese: 憲法重大信條十九條
- Simplified Chinese: 宪法重大信条十九条
Transcriptions

The Nineteen Articles (Chinese: 十九信條), officially the Nineteen Major Articles of Good Faith on the Constitution (憲法重大信條十九條), also known as the Doctrine of Nineteen Articles and 19 Fundamental Articles, was a constitutional document, and the only constitution of the late Qing dynasty, which was promulgated by the Qing government on 3 November 1911, in the midst of the Wuchang Uprising.

The purpose of Nineteen Articles was to establish a British-style system of ministerial responsibility, and reconstitute the Qing government as a constitutional monarchy. These articles restrained the power of the emperor and expanded the power of the congress. However, after only three months (February 1912) the monarchy was abolished following the end of the Xinhai Revolution.

== See also ==
- Preparative Constitutionalism
- Principles of the Constitution (1908)
