= Jiang Qian =

Chinese scholar and educator

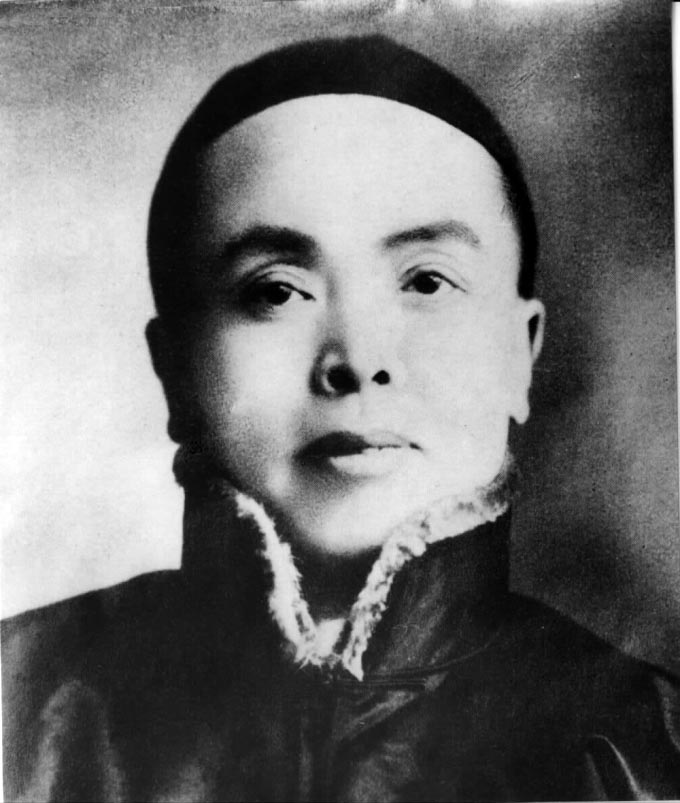
Jiang Qian

Jiang Qian (Chinese: 江謙; 1876–1942), courtesy name Yiyuan (易園), art name Yangfu (陽復), was an influential Chinese scholar and educator.

== Biography ==
In his early years, Jiang studied at the Ziyang Academy in Huizhou, Anhui, and Wenzheng Academy in Nanjing. In 1902, he helped Zhang Jian to found Tongzhou Normal School, the first Chinese normal school, and then became the school's president. In 1914, he was appointed the president of Nanking Higher Normal School, on the site of former Liangjiang Higher Normal School. Nanking Higher Normal School later turned to be National Southeastern University and renamed National Central University and Nanjing University. In 1918, when taken ill, he nominated the provost Kuo Ping-Wen (郭秉文) to be the acting president. A year later in 1919, he quit the post of school president.
