= Wang Zuoliang =

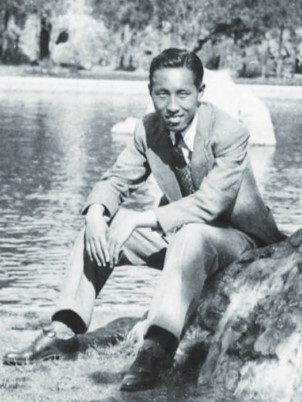
Wang Zuoliang in Kunming in 1939

Wang Zuoliang (12 February 1916 – 19 January 1995) was a Chinese modern poet, translator, and scholar of English literature, born in Shangyu, Zhejiang Province.

== Life ==
From 1929 to 1934, Wang studied at Wenhua Middle School in Wuchang before studying at Tsinghua University. He He graduated from the Department of Foreign Languages at Tsinghua University in 1939 and subsequently served as a teaching assistant and lecturer at Tsinghua University (then part of the National Southwest Associated University). After the war, he was awarded the Ninth Sino-British Boxer Indemnity Scholarship for postgraduate study abroad. In the autumn of 1947, he was awarded a full scholarship to study at Merton College, University of Oxford to pursue research in English literature. He returned to China in September 1949, on the eve of the founding of the People's Republic of China, and was appointed professor at the Beijing Foreign Studies University.

== Other titles ==
He served as Advisor to Beijing Foreign Studies University and Director of its Institute of Foreign Literature, Vice President of the China Foreign Language Teaching and Research Association, President of the China English Language Education Association, Vice President of the China Shakespeare Research Association, Council Member of the China Writers Association, and Editor-in-Chief of the journal Foreign Literature.

== Major works ==
- The Literary Reputation of John Webster, a Seventeenth-Century English Playwright
- Essays on English Literature
- Essays on English Stylistics
- Between Chinese and Foreign Literature
- Degrees of Affinity：Studies in Comparative Literature
- Zhaolan Ji
