= Provincial assemblies (Qing dynasty) =

Political advisory body in the late Qing dynasty

Provincial Assemblies
- Traditional Chinese: 省諮議局
- Simplified Chinese: 省谘议局
Transcriptions
Standard Mandarin
- Hanyu Pinyin: Shěng Zī Yì Jú
- Wade–Giles: Sheng Tzu I Chü

The Provincial assemblies (simplified Chinese: 咨议局; traditional Chinese: 諮議局) were provincial advisory institutions established in 1909 in each province during the Constitutional Movement of the late Qing dynasty.

According to the Regulation of the Consultative Bureau, the meetings of the Bureau were divided into two types: regular meetings and temporary meetings.

== Overview ==
The Consultative Bureau was the local institution of the Advisory Council, and it had a Speaker and two Deputy Speakers.

Except for Xinjiang, all provinces announced the establishment of Consultative Bureaus sequentially. In total, there were 21 Consultative Bureaus throughout the Qing Dynasty.

From March 1909, each province began to elect members of the Consultative Bureau one after another. On October 14, with the exception of Xinjiang, all 21 provincial Consultative Bureaus were established and opened as scheduled, with more than 1,670 members elected.

The election of members of the Consultative Bureau is the first election of public opinion representatives in the history of China.

== See also ==
- Advisory Council (Qing dynasty)
