= Principles of the Constitution =

1908 Qing dynasty attempt to establish constitution

Outline of Imperial Constitution
- Launched: On 27 August 1908
- Promulgated: by Qing government
- Other names: Outline of the Constitution Compiled by Imperial Order

Principles of the Constitution
- Traditional Chinese: 欽定憲法大綱
- Simplified Chinese: 钦定宪法大纲
Transcriptions
Standard Mandarin
- Hanyu Pinyin: Qīndìng Xiànfǎ Dàgāng

The Principles of the Constitution of 1908 (Chinese: 欽定憲法大綱), also known as the Outline of Imperial Constitution or the Outline of the Constitution Compiled by Imperial Order, was an attempt by the Qing dynasty of China to establish a constitutional monarchy at the beginning of the 20th century. It established a constitutional monarchy and confirmed some basic rights of citizens, while imposing some limitations on the power of the monarch.

Since this outline of the constitution was not democratically formulated, but was promulgated in the name of the Guangxu Emperor by the Empress Dowager Cixi, it was called the "Outline of Imperial Constitution".

== Main contents ==
Outline of Imperial Constitution was based on the "Constitution of the Empire of Japan", and consists of 23 articles, including the body text "Powers of the Monarch" (君上大權) and the appendix "Rights and Duties of Subjects" (臣民權利義務).

== Impact and evaluation ==
The Outline of Imperial Constitution was modelled on the Japanese Meiji Constitution, and is the first constitutional document in Chinese history.

== See also ==
- Late Qing reforms
- Preparative Constitutionalism
- Nineteen Articles in 1911
