= Commission for Studying Constitutional Government =

Late Qing reform commission

- Shortened to: CSCG
- Simplified Chinese: 宪政编查馆
- Traditional Chinese: 憲政編查館

The Commission for Studying Constitutional Government (shortened to CSCG; simplified Chinese: 宪政编查馆; traditional Chinese: 憲政編查館), also known as Constitution Compilation Commission, was an organ responsible for constitutional affairs in the whole country during the preparation of the constitution during the late Qing dynasty.

Constitution Compilation Commission was established by the Qing court in 1907, and its forerunner was the "Committee for Studying the Ways of Government" (考察政治馆) set up by the Qing government in 1905.
