= Preparative Constitutionalism =

Qing policy of constitutional reform

- Officially started: September 1, 1906
- Ended in: 1911
- Result: Failed

Preparative Constitutionalism
- Traditional Chinese: 預備立憲
- Simplified Chinese: 预备立宪
Transcriptions
Standard Mandarin
- Hanyu Pinyin: yù bèi lì xiàn
Yue: Cantonese
- Jyutping: jyu6 bei6 lap6 hin3

Preparative Constitutionalism or Preparatory Constitutionalism (traditional Chinese: 預備立憲; simplified Chinese: 预备立宪), also known as Preparation of Constitutionalism, refers to attempts by the imperial government of the Qing dynasty of China at implementing top-down constitutional reforms.

The Qing government issued an imperial edict, deciding to imitate the implementation of constitutionalism, but believed that the conditions were not available, so it was necessary to prepare in advance, so it was called "Preparative Constitutionalism".

On September 1, 1906, the Qing court formally declared the Preparative Constitutionalism, thus taking the first step in the history of Chinese constitutionalism and the first step in the reform of the Chinese state system. With the outbreak of the Xinhai Revolution in October 1911, the process of Preparative Constitutionalism was interrupted and failed completely with the demise of the Qing dynasty in February 1912.

== See also ==
- Late Qing reforms
- Advisory Council (Qing dynasty)
- Principles of the Constitution (1908)
- Cabinet of Prince Qing
