= Bordered White Banner =

- Bordered White Banner
- Active: 1615 – 1912
- Country: Later Jin; Qing dynasty
- Part of: Eight Banners
- Commander: Dudu, eldest son of Cuyen, Ajige (12th son of Nurhaci), Hong Taiji (held power to both White Banners) The Emperor

Bordered White Banner

Chinese name
- Traditional Chinese: 鑲白旗
- Simplified Chinese: 镶白旗
Transcriptions
Standard Mandarin
- Hanyu Pinyin: xiāngbáiqí

Mongolian name
- Mongolian Cyrillic: Хөвөөт цагаан хошуу

Manchu name
- Manchu script: ᡴᡠᠪᡠᡥᡝ ᡧᠠᠩᡤᡳᠶᠠᠨ ᡤᡡᠰᠠ
- Romanization: kubuhe šanggiyan gūsa

The Bordered White Banner (Chinese: 鑲白旗) was one of the Eight Banners of Manchu military and society during the Later Jin and Qing dynasty of China. It was among the lower five banners. In many movies, when the Bordered White Banner was first split from the Plain White Banner, the origin commander of the Plain White Banner, Cuyen, who fell out of favor with Nurhaci for political abuse of his brothers and using voodoo talisman to curse his own father Nurhaci. The Plain White Banner was then given to Hong Taiji and the newly split Bordered White Banner was given to Dudu, the eldest son of Cuyen. Later on it was given to Ajige, Nurhaci's 12th son; however, due to their young age, both Dudu and Ajige, Dudu's uncle and Ajige's 8th brother, Hong Taiji raised both of them and essentially controlled both White Banners.

== Members ==
- Dudu (Manchu Prince, eldest son of Cuyen)
- Hong Taiji (Manchu Prince, 8th son and hier of Nurhaci)
- Ajige (Manchu Prince, 12th son of Nurhaci)
- Dorgon (Manchu Prince, 14th son of Nurhaci)
- Cuiyan (1866–1925), Secondary consort (1866–1925), of the Manchu Bordered White Banner Liugiya clan, personal name Cuiyan, was a consort of Yixuan. She was 26 years his junior.
- Fengshan (1860–1911), general in the Beiyang Army assassinated in Guangzhou
- Kathy Chow (1966–2023), was a Hong Kong actress who is widely known for her leading roles in Hong Kong TVB series during the late 1980s to 1990s. She was descended from the Gūwalgiya clan of the Bordered White Banner.
- Akdun (阿克敦) Styled: Lixuan (May 4, 1685- February 22, 1756) was an official of the Qing Dynasty. He was a member of the Janggiya (章佳) clan
- Zaiyi, better known by his title Prince Duan (or Prince Tuan), was one of the leaders of the Boxer Rebellion of 1899–1901. Zaiyi was born in the Aisin Gioro clan as the second son of Yicong (Prince Dun), the fifth son of the Daoguang Emperor.

== Notable clans ==
- Gūwalgiya
- Liugiya
- Janggiya
- Mu'ercai
- Tunggiya
