= Chinese Assassination Corps =

Anarchist group during the Qing dynasty

The Chinese Assassination Corps (or China Assassination Corps or Sina Assassination Corps, Chinese: 支那暗殺團; pinyin: zhīnà ànshā tuán) was an anarchist group, active in China during the final years of the Qing dynasty. One of the first organized anarchist movements in China and fiercely anti-Qing, it aimed to overthrow the then-ruling Aisin Gioro and the Empire of China through the use of revolutionary terror.

== History ==
In 1910, the left-wing Tongmenghui nationalist (later President of the Reorganized National Government of China during the Second Sino-Japanese War) Wang Jingwei, who had been influenced by Russian anarchism while studying in Japan, planned to assassinate Prince-Regent Chun (father of the young Xuantong Emperor). The plan, which was to be carried out in April, failed as Wang and his associates were arrested in Beijing in March.

In response to the plot's failure, the Chinese Assassination Corps was formed later the same year to carry on the imprisoned would-be assassins' mission. Founded in Hong Kong, it had about ten active members in the beginning, most of which were Tongmenghui activists disillusioned with the tactic of revolutionary mass action. Instead, they turned to individual action, the propaganda of the deed, in the form of assassination. This was deeply inspired by roughly contemporary groups like the Russian People's Will, a left-wing terrorist group most well known for killing Tsar Alexander II in 1881, and the Black Hand, a Serbian pan-Slavic nationalist organization which would later go on to trigger World War I by assassinating Archduke Franz Ferdinand in 1914. These first members included people like Chen Jiongming, Gao Jianfu, Xie Yingbo, and Liu Shifu.

Liu Shifu (1884–1915) especially would go on to become prominent within the Chinese anarchist milieu. Having been radicalized while studying in Japan (much as did Wang Jingwei), Liu, a Tongmenghui member, was involved in several assassinations before a 1907 attempt on the life of a Guangdong military commander, Li Chun, cost him one of his hands and two years in prison after his explosive device detonated by accident. He joined the Chinese Assassination Corps right after his release in 1910. He would later go on to reject the tactic of revolutionary terror, favoring instead grassroots organizing among the peasants and workers. Associated with Liu was another Corps member, Xie Yingbo, who would later become a labor union leader and anarcho-syndicalist.

In 1911 tensions in China grew to a breaking point. This was especially the case in on the urbanized southern Chinese coast. For example, in April 1911, the Second Guangzhou Uprising (led by Huang Xing) broke out – and was quickly crushed. One of the commanders central to putting down this revolt was the aforementioned Li Chun, who had previously been involved in combating many revolutionary uprisings since 1907. He became a target of not only the Chinese Assassination Corps, but another insurrectionist group as well. The Corps' designated assassin, Lin Kuan-tz'u, joined forces with the other assassin – Ch'en Ching-yüeh – after realizing their common goal while tracking Li. On August 13, Lin attempted to kill the commander by throwing a home-made bomb at him as Li was making his way to his office. The explosion wounded Li and killed several of his guards, who quickly gunned down the bomb-thrower. A waiting Ch'en was soon arrested at a secondary location, and later executed.

On 10 October 1911, the Wuchang Uprising broke out. Considered by some historians to have been triggered at least partially by the Second Guangzhou Uprising, the revolt would itself go on to serve as the catalyst to the Xinhai Revolution. The Revolution of 1911 first came to Guangdong on 25 October, when the new Turkic-General Fengshan, who had been named as a replacement for the recently assassinated Fu-ch'i, was assassinated within minutes of arriving in the city. The deed was the work of a group of revolutionaries centered on the Chinese Assassination Corps and carried out by two brothers, Li Ying-sheng and Li P'ei-chi, both of whom escaped.
