= Beiyang =

Geographic region of Qing China

Coordinates: 41°00′N 123°00′E

The term Beiyang (Chinese: 北洋; pinyin: Běiyáng; Wade-Giles: Peiyang) literally means Northern Ocean. Initially a purely geographic term, it originated toward the end of the Qing dynasty, and it referred to the coastal provinces of Zhili (Traditional Chinese:直隸, Simplified Chinese: 直隶, pinyin: Zhílì, today's Hebei), Shandong and Liaoning that bordered the Yellow Sea (itself a marginal sea of the Pacific Ocean) and surrounded the imperial capital of Beijing (then known as Peking).

The term later acquired a political significance, denoting the imperial heartland. The position of Minister of Beiyang (北洋通商大臣) in the late Qing Dynasty was held by the Viceroy of Zhili, whose main responsibilities were trade relations and occasionally foreign affairs.

== See also ==
- Beiyang Army
- Beiyang Fleet
- Beiyang Government
- Beiyang University
