= Fengshan (general) =

Qing dynasty general (died 1911)

- 鳳山
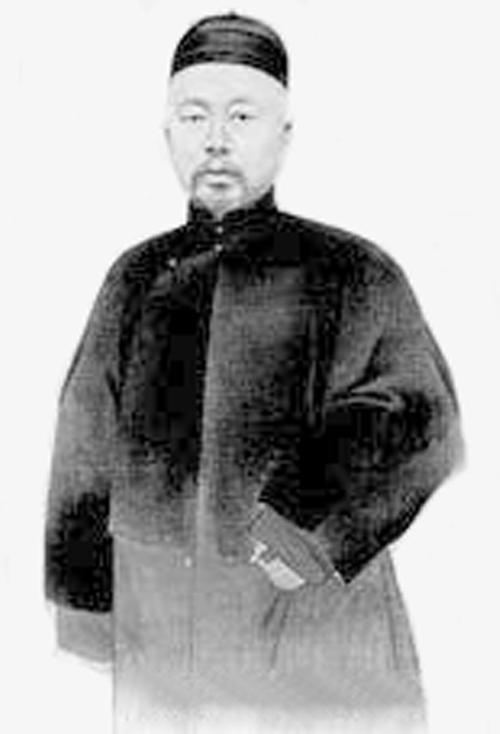
- Born: 1860
- Died: 25 October 1911 (aged 50–51); Guangzhou, Qing China
- Military career
- Branch: Bordered White Banner; Beiyang Army

Chinese name
- Traditional Chinese: 鳳山
- Simplified Chinese: 凤山
Transcriptions
Standard Mandarin
- Hanyu Pinyin: Fèngshān
Yue: Cantonese
- Yale Romanization: Fung^{6} Saan^{1}

Fengshan (traditional Chinese: 鳳山; simplified Chinese: 凤山; pinyin: Fèngshān, 1860 – 25 October 1911) was a Qing dynasty general. A member of the Bordered White Banner, he passed the Imperial Examination with a focus on translation. After some time as a translator and secretary, as well as a stint in the police, he transferred to the military. Between 1900 and 1911, he held numerous positions, including division commander with the Beiyang Army as well as Tartar-General in Xi'an. Fengshan was assigned to Guangdong after the assassination of Fuqi, but he was himself killed by the Chinese Assassination Corps upon arrival. His home in Beijing has been recognized as a cultural property.

== Early life and military career ==
Fengshan was born in 1860, a member of the Liu clan. He took the courtesy name Yumen (禹門, 禹门) as an adult, and passed the Imperial Examination at the provincial level with a focus on translation. Part of the Bordered White Banner of the Eight Banners, he spent his early government career as a translator and secretary.

Fengshan was later elevated by the Qing dynasty to the Dong'an Patrol Branch, a police position, in which capacity he oversaw the punishment of French soldiers from the Eight-Nation Alliance in 1900. Later that year, he was appointed governor-general of the Kinki Army Town Training Centre. In 1905, Fengshan was made commander of the first division of the Beiyang Army, with the third, fifth, and sixth being relinquished to him by General Yuan Shikai. Minister of War Tieliang created the Metropolitan Training Office to present a unified command, appointing Fengshan to its leadership; direct command of the first division was assumed by He Zonglian.

In 1907, Fengshan left this post to become the tartar-general of Xi'an; he was proposed for the role by Yuan Shikai, who elsewhere had decried Fengshan's education and lack of military experience. In December, it was announced that he would be returning to the Beiyang Army to lead four divisions. By 1910 he was inspector general of the first and sixth divisions in Beijing. Fengshan left this position in August 1910, being made Tartar-General of Hubei, with his office in Jingzhou. The North China Herald described this relocation as significant, as Fengshan was opposed to General Yinchang but an ally of Tieliang.

== Death ==
Following the assassination of Fuqi by Wen Shengcai, Fengshan was appointed General of Guangdong by Prince Chun upon the recommendation of Prince Ching. His departure to the province was delayed, attributed variously to fear and to efforts to dissuade him. The Wuchang Uprising had broken out in Wuhan some weeks earlier, and unrest was spreading. Fengshan arrived in Guangzhou via the Tianzi Wharf on the morning of 25 October 1911, having taken a circuitous route that included ship passage from Shanghai and Hong Kong. As he was being carried in a sedan chair, he was killed in an explosion, together with twenty soldiers who had been escorting him; another eighteen people were wounded. One report indicated that Fengshan's wife was also killed. Fire from the explosion spread to nearby houses, causing further damage and destroying seven homes.

The assassination of Fengshan is generally attributed to Li Yingsheng and Li Peiji, brothers who had joined the Tongmenghui. (Note: Wang Xiwen, the nephew of Tongmenghui and Kuomintang leader Wang Jingwei, attributes the assassination to Li Xiaosheng (Wang 2014, p. 51). Prior to 2004, Chinese texts generally attributed the assassination exclusively to Li Peiji; Zhang & Qin (2004, p. 85) quote five texts, including schoolbooks, histories of Guangzhou, and a biography of Huang Xing, as examples.) When Yingsheng became ill from the fumes, Peiji worked alone to prepare an ambush at the Chengji Foreign Goods Store on Cangqianzhi Street, dropping the bombs as Fengshan passed with his retinue. Two other cells were prepared with other ambushes, in case Li failed. In his autobiography, Hu Hanmin wrote that Fengshan was targeted for assassination due to his previous command experience as well as his avowal to reinforce the military in Guangdong.

Sources differ as to the mechanisms of the attack and its aftermath. In their review of a primary document penned by the secretary to Hu Hanmin, Zhang Xiaohui and Qin Hongfong write that the largest of the three explosives weighed 17 pounds (7.7 kg); meanwhile, Zhu Jiang of Phoenix Television writes that the brothers loaded a total of 9.3 kilograms (21 lb) of explosives into three pig iron shells. The Lis were instructed and received intelligence from by Huang Xing of the Chinese Assassination Corps, and coordinated by a fellow revolutionary; Zhang and Qin identify this individual as Li Zhan, while the Haifeng County Municipal Government identify him as Chen Qiyou, who was also a member of a failsafe team. Contemporary reports indicated that the assassin was mortally wounded, while the Li brothers survived the revolution and travelled abroad for education.

Following Fengshan's assassination, Guangzhou entered a state of alert, with several wealthy residents fleeing the city. It was expected that the ongoing 1911 Revolution would reach Guangzhou, and merchants in the city urged the Qing representatives to acquiesce to the revolutionary forces. They even began independence festivities, but these celebrations were cut short by Viceroy Zhang Mingqi. Zhang ultimately agreed on 9 November 1911 to recognize the republican government; he later fled the city. Zhu writes that, after the assassination, local restaurants began to name their fried egg dishes "Fengshan Enters the City" (鳳山入城; 凤山入城), a play on the shared pronunciation of "fried egg" (炸蛋, zhà dàn) and "bomb" (炸彈, 炸弹, zhàdàn).

== Legacy ==
After his death, Fengshan was granted the title of Junior Guardian of the Heir Apparent, the rank of cavalry commander, and posthumous name Qinjie (勤节) by the Qing government. All demerits he had accumulated during his military career were removed, and the Emperor called upon any children to present themselves for favours. Fengshan's home at No. 15 Dongmianhua Hutong in Dongcheng, Beijing, was declared a cultural relic by the municipal government in 2001. Used as a residential courtyard, it has been admired for its brickwork, including extensive carvings that feature the Eight Immortals as well as flowers and ruyi patterns.

== Works cited ==
- "Bomb Kills General Shan". San Francisco Call. 26 October 1911. p. 1 – via Newspaper Archive.
- 陈其尤 [Chen Qiyou] (in Chinese). Haifeng County Municipal Government. 6 June 2020.
- Cheng, Zhifen; Zhou, Shangyi; Young, Stephen (2014). "Place, Capital Flows and Property Regimes: The Elites' Former Houses in Beijing's South Luogu Lane". Sustainability. 7 (1): 398–421. Bibcode:2014Sust....7..398C. doi:10.3390/su7010398.
- 中国历史大辞典 [Dictionary of Chinese History] (in Chinese). Vol. 2. Shanghai: Shanghai Dictionary Publishing House. 1992.
- Esherick, Joseph W.; Wei, C.X. George (2013). China: How the Empire Fell. New York: Routledge. ISBN 978-1134612222.
- "Murder of a General". The Sydney Morning Herald. 27 October 1911. p. 9.
- "News from East Asia". Northern China Herald. 23 September 1910. p. 8 – via Newspaper Archive.
- 东棉花胡同15号（凤山将军宅） [No. 15 Dongmianhua Hutong (General Fengshan's Residence)]. The Paper (in Chinese). 26 February 2010.
- "Revolutionaries Seize the War Chest". The Newark Courier. 2 November 1911. p. 4.
- Rhoads, Edward J. M. (1975). China's Republican Revolution: The Case of Kwangtung, 1895-1913. Harvard University Press. ISBN 978-0-674-11980-2.
- Rhoads, Edward J. M. (2000). Manchus and Han: Ethnic Relations and Political Power in Late Qing and Early Republican China, 1861–1928. Seattle: University of Washington Press. ISBN 978-0-295-98040-9.
- "Tartar General's Death". The Register. 28 October 1911. p. 13.
- "The Canton Outrage". The Straits Times. 20 November 1911. p. 8.
- "The Command of the Peiyang Forces". Northern China Herald. 22 November 1907. p. 52 – via Newspaper Archive.
- "The Command of the Peiyang Forces". Northern China Herald. 6 December 1907. p. 30 – via Newspaper Archive.
- Thompson, John Stuart (1913). China Revolutionized. Indianapolis: Bobbs–Merrill Company.
- Wang Xiwen (汪希文) (2014). 我與江霞公太史父女: 汪希文回憶錄 [Father and Daughter Jiangxia Gongtaishi: Memoirs of Wang Xiwen] (in Chinese). Independent Writer. ISBN 978-986-5729-37-0.
- Zhang Xiaohui (张晓辉), Qin Hongfong (秦洪芳) (2004). 凤山将军被刺案新探 [A New Exploration of the Assassination of General Fengshan]. Academic Journal of Jinyang (in Chinese). 2: 85–86. doi:10.16392/j.cnki.14-1057/c.2004.02.024.
- Zhu Jiang (朱江) (9 October 2010). 炸弹落入 [Bombs Fall] (in Chinese). Phoenix Television.
