= Beiyang Army =

20th-century Chinese army

- 北洋軍
- Symbol of the Beiyang Army during the Republic
- Active: 1895–1928
- Country: Qing Empire; (1895–1911); (Republic of China (1912–1949)) Republic of China; (1912–15; 1916–28); Empire of China; (1915–16)
- Type: Infantry, artillery, cavalry
- Role: Land warfare
- Size: 20,000 (1902); 60,000 (1907); 536,000 (1919); 700,000 (1926)
- Garrison/HQ: Tianjin; Beijing (from 1907)
- Engagements: Boxer Rebellion; 1911 Revolution; Second Revolution; National Protection War; Constitutional Protection Movement; Occupation of Mongolia; Northern Expedition

Commanders
- Notable commanders: Yuan Shikai; Fengshan; Yinchang; Duan Qirui; Feng Guozhang; Cao Kun

The Beiyang Army (Chinese: 北洋軍; pinyin: Běiyáng Jūn; lit. 'Northern Ocean Army'), named after Yuan Shikai, who became Beiyang Minister (北洋大臣; Běiyáng Dàchén) in 1901, was a military force established in the late Qing dynasty. Under the command of Yuan, it formed the core of the Qing government's military modernization following the First Sino-Japanese War and became the most powerful component of the New Army. The army played a major role in the 1911 Revolution against both the Qing government and Sun Yat-sen's revolutionary forces. After Yuan's death in 1916, its commanders divided into rival factions known collectively as the Beiyang warlords (北洋軍閥; Běiyáng Jūnfá), whose struggles for power ushered in the Warlord Era.

The Beiyang Army originated with the Dingwu Army (Dìnɡwǔ Jūn), established in 1894 and organized along modern lines with infantry, cavalry, artillery, and logistical branches. Initially trained at Tianjin by Hu Yufen with the assistance of German officers, it was taken over by Yuan in late 1895 and reorganized as the New Field Army (Xīnjiàn Lùjūn). Together with Zhang Zhidong's Self-Strengthening Army (Zìqiáng Jūn), it formed the basis of the New Army. Yuan's forces expanded over the years, particularly during the Boxer Rebellion and the Russo-Japanese War, and by 1911 had become China's strongest military force, serving as the Qing's central army alongside the provincial New Armies.

During the 1911 Revolution, Yuan, on the strength of the Beiyang Army, negotiated the abdication of the Qing emperor and Sun Yat-sen's relinquishment of the presidency of the Republic of China. Yuan subsequently set up the Beiyang government in Beijing. Following Yuan's death, the army fragmented into competing factions, principally the Anhui, Zhili, and Fengtian cliques, which fought a series of wars for control of Northern China. Their power was largely broken by the Kuomintang's Northern Expedition, which brought the Beiyang government and the principal phase of the Warlord Era to an end.

== Origins in the late Qing (to 1900) ==
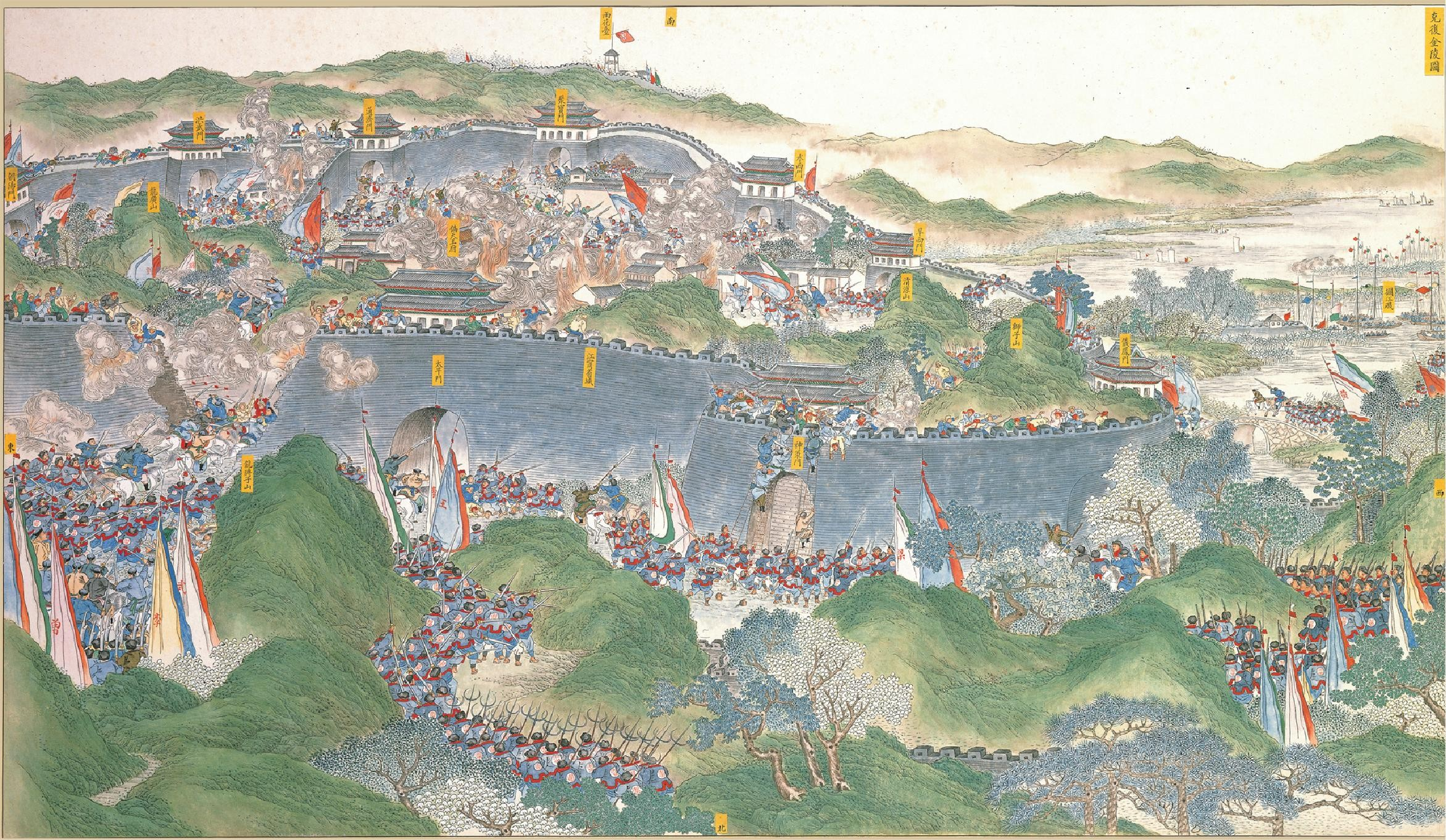
The Xiang Army during the Battle of Nanjing in the Taiping Rebellion

The traditional military forces of the Qing dynasty were the Manchu Banners and the Green Standard Army. The Bannermen were hereditary soldiers and in addition to pay also received other privileges from the government. They were stationed in garrisons in Beijing and other major cities. The Green Standard Army, despite its name, was primarily a police force rather than an army, and had garrisons in each province. The military skills of both the Bannermen and the Green Standard troops gradually declined over the next two centuries, in large part because their officers did not consider training to be important, and by the middle of the 19th century they could only put up a minimal defense. As late as the 1890s much of the Chinese army was still equipped with long bows, swords, and spears, and many of their firearms were antiquated matchlocks. Starting around that time two other forces emerged in China after the traditional army failed to stop the Nian and Taiping Rebellions: mercenaries hired by provincial governors known as "braves," and modernized units consisting of braves who were trained with European military drill. The most prominent of the latter were Zeng Guofan's Xiang Army and Li Hongzhang's Huai Army. The braves, relatively well armed and paid, were estimated to make up ten percent of the Qing dynasty's armed forces and were private armies raised and funded by provincial officials. The ethnic Manchu dynasty was reluctant to provide funding for armies led by Han Chinese. The Green Standard Army was relegated to local security duty while the braves were the rapid response force that could be deployed to any part of the Qing Empire. Li Hongzhang, who founded the Huai Army in 1862 and later became the Viceroy (or governor-general) of Zhili and Commissioner of the Northern Seas (Beiyang), used it as his personal power base and provided for its equipment and funding.

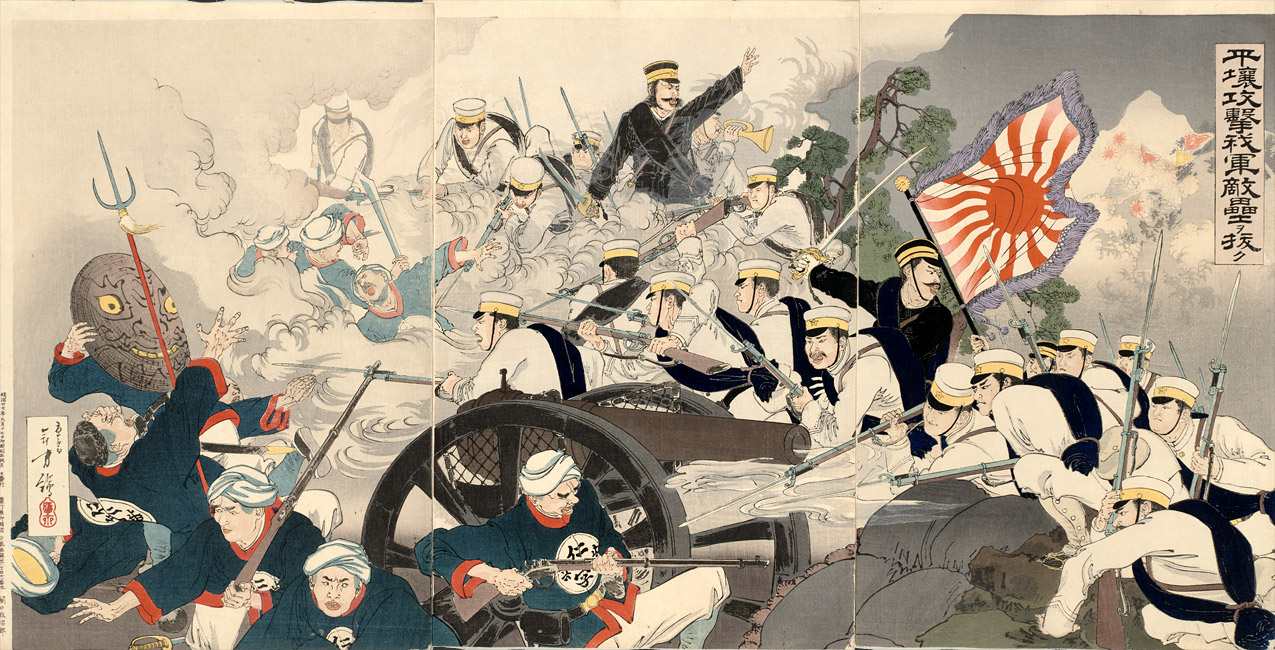
Japanese print showing the Huai Army fighting the Japanese at Pyongyang, 1894

By the time of the First Sino-Japanese War in 1894–95, the Huai Army was considered to be the best force the Qing dynasty could field. Its arsenal included Mauser breechloader rifles, Krupp artillery, and a large quantity of ammunition. The quality of this equipment was comparable to that of the Imperial Japanese Army at the time, and its field commanders were experienced veterans who distinguished themselves during the Nian Rebellion. However, the Huai Army was still not considered a fully modernized force. The training of its soldiers used elements of old Chinese drill, sometimes with spears and other medieval weapons instead of firearms, and lacked proper marksmanship practice and the coordination of small units. There were reports during the war that some soldiers did not know how to use their firearms or artillery. Discipline was not strongly maintained, and the Chinese were more likely to abandon their positions during battle. The Huai Army also did not have organized supply, medical, transport, or engineering services, so the soldiers on campaign had to live off the land or take goods from the local population, as they did in Korea during the war. Chinese forces in Korea suffered a series of defeats, and in September 1894 the Japanese victory at the Battle of Pyongyang largely destroyed the Huai Army.

The defeat of China's best forces by Japan caused the Qing court to authorize the creation of units based entirely on the Western model. Before the end of 1895 two organizations were established for this purpose: the New Field Army (Note: It was also called the Pacification Army in its early history, which itself had been formed during the war with Japan near Tianjin, at the training camp used by the Huai Army.) organized by Yuan Shikai in the province of Zhili, and the Self-Strengthening Army organized by Zhang Zhidong in Nanjing. In contrast to the simple organization of the braves, these two armies both had dedicated infantry, cavalry, artillery, engineering, and other technical branches, and specific attention was given to the recruitment, training, discipline, and pay of the soldiers. German officers assisted with the creation of these forces, and the German Army was specifically used as the example to follow. Unlike earlier forces, the New Field Army received its funding from the central government's Ministry of Finance. It was initially the size of a brigade and its foreign staff included Constantin von Hanneken and Johan Wilhelm Normann Munthe. The idea for it originated with Hanneken during the war, who wanted to create a foreign-trained corps to become the basis of a new imperial (instead of provincial) army, and Prince Gong submitted his plan in a memorial to the throne. On 8 December 1895, Yuan Shikai was appointed commander of the New Field Army, with the backing of the Prince Qing, Minister of War Ronglu, and Li Hongzhang.

The officer corps of this brigade-sized force in the late 1890s included five future presidents of the Republic of China, one prime minister, and multiple provincial governors; a testament to how influential the Beiyang Army would become. (Note: Some of the notable officers were: Duan Qirui, Feng Guozhang, Cao Kun, Xu Shichang, Wang Shizhen, and Zhang Xun.) But during the first several years of their existence, the Newly Created and Self-Strengthening Armies were considered experimental units. During the coup that ended the Hundred Days' Reform of the Guangxu Emperor, the reformers attempted to gain the support of Yuan Shikai and his troops, which were considered the best in north China, to counter the military forces of the conservative Ronglu. Yuan refused to participate in the plot, instead giving it away, and Empress Dowager Cixi regained full control over the Qing government after the emperor was detained. Following the coup, the Qing court wanted to strengthen the defenses of the capital. On the recommendation of Ronglu in December 1898, several existing units in north China were placed under his direct command as the Wuwei Corps (Wuweijun), (Note: The Chinese names for these units featured the stem 軍 jun, literally "corps" or "army," meaning a force of two or more divisions.) which is also translated as the Guards Army. Yuan Shikai's New Field Army was made part of the Wuwei Corps as its Right Division and was considered to be the best of the corps' five divisions. When the Boxer Rebellion started in late 1899 Yuan was appointed as provincial governor of Shandong to maintain order there, and he took the Right Division with him. The four other divisions of the Guards Army were either destroyed or took heavy casualties in combat against the foreign relief forces that arrived in Zhili in the summer of 1900.

== Yuan Shikai's ascendancy (1901–1908) ==
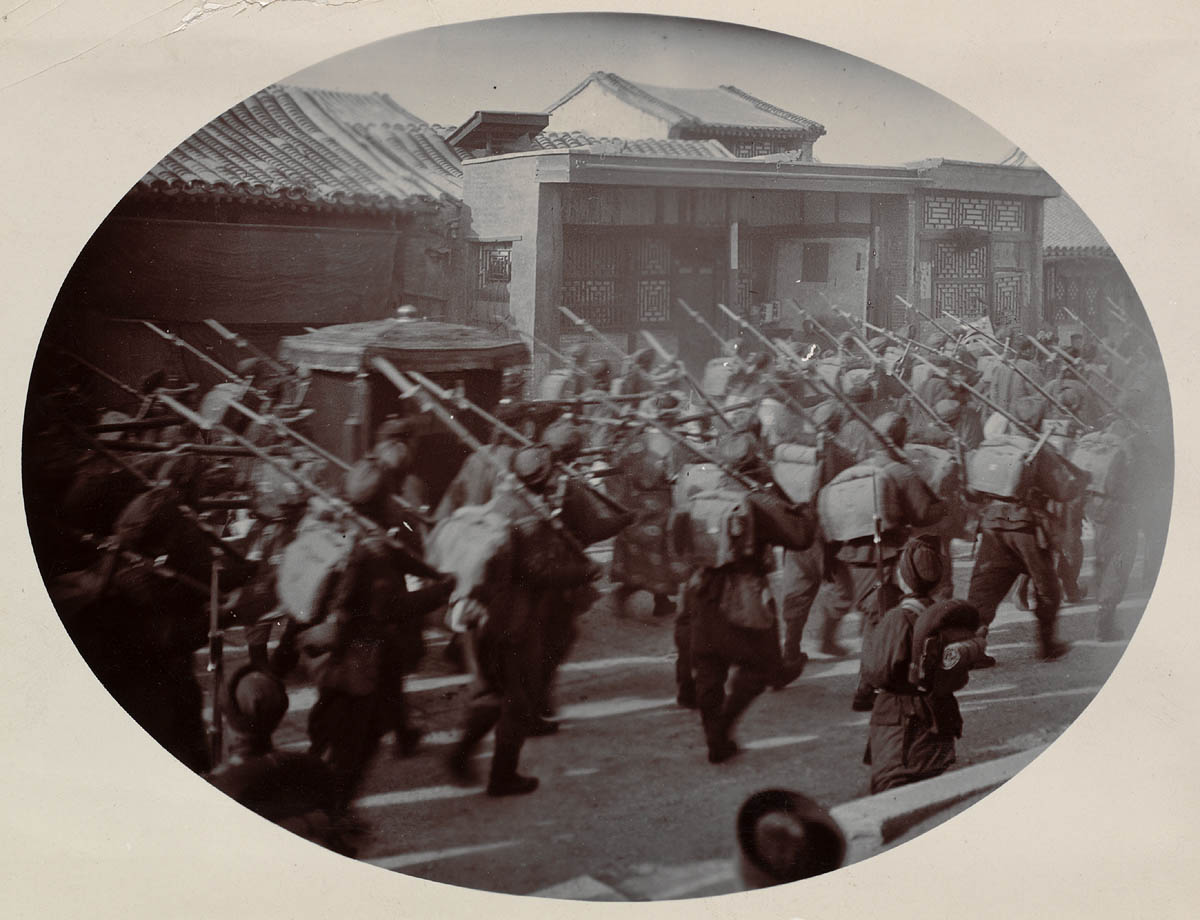
Yuan Shikai's Right Division of the Guards Army escorting the Qing court back to Beijing after the Boxer Rebellion, early 1902

Yuan Shikai had been recognized as a military specialist by the Qing court in 1899, whose Right Division of the Guards Army was well trained and well equipped with standardized uniforms and weaponry, the latter consisting of Mauser rifles, Maxim machine guns, and one- to six-pounder artillery pieces. During his time in Shandong the division was strengthened with additional troops, including Zhang Zhidong's Self-Strengthening Army, and became the only unit of the Wuwei Corps that was not decimated by the Boxer Rebellion, which ended the corps as an organization. The other semi-modernized Manchu Banner forces, the Peking Field Force and the Tiger Spirit Division, were also destroyed in battle. When the imperial court began rebuilding the security forces of the Beijing metropolitan area in 1901, Yuan Shikai was put in charge of this task.

The Empress Dowager Cixi and conservative officials recognized the need for reform to preserve the dynasty after the Boxer Rebellion. They were willing to embrace military reorganization much more than other aspects of modernization. Among the main changes of the Qing New Policies, ordered by edicts in September 1901, were the establishment of a military academy in each province to entirely replace the antiquated military examinations and the creation of a Western-style standing army along with reserves.

The Beiyang Army began to take shape after Yuan Shikai became the Viceroy of Zhili in late 1901, following the death of Li Hongzhang. He started by putting together two divisions for the standing army in Zhili, with the first of these, founded in October 1902, being a new formation known as the Left Division of the Beiyang Standing Army. In December 1902, the Qing court also ordered him to begin training a force of several thousand Manchu Bannermen volunteers who could serve as Imperial Guards in the Inner City of Beijing. During their initial training in 1903 they were called the Metropolitan Banners Standing Army, and were led by the nobleman Tieliang. Yuan had requested Tieliang's assistance with the training of the Bannermen, and in June 1903 they created an office for training the Metropolitan Banners. This became the basis for the Military Training Bureau that was created in December 1903 as a section of the larger Army Reorganization Bureau, which was established to oversee the military reform taking place all over China. The Army Reorganization Bureau's leadership included Yuan Shikai and Tieliang, and its overall director was Prince Qing. It eventually became more important than the traditional Ministry of War, and was an adjunct of the Grand Council that reported directly to Empress Dowager Cixi.

In January 1904, as tensions rose between Japan and Russia in China's Manchuria region shortly before the outbreak of the Russo-Japanese War, Yuan Shikai sent a memorial to the throne asking for funding to double the size of the Beiyang Army. This increase in Yuan Shikai's military power around the Qing capital reflected the trust he had with Empress Dowager Cixi. The staffing for the Army Reorganization Bureau in Beijing came from Yuan Shikai's military associates, and it became an extension of his influence to such a degree that the Japanese military attaché to China claimed in 1906 that it was more of a nominal organization and had less relevance than one of its departments, Yuan's Military Training Bureau in Tianjin. But in reality, Yuan Shikai was able to make use of the Army Reorganization Bureau to oversee all of the New Army forces across the entire Qing Empire and to funnel money from the military reform budget to his own Beiyang Army. Although every province was ordered to create New Army units in 1904, they rarely received funds for this purpose from the Army Reorganization Bureau, because it was mostly going to Yuan Shikai's administration in Zhili.

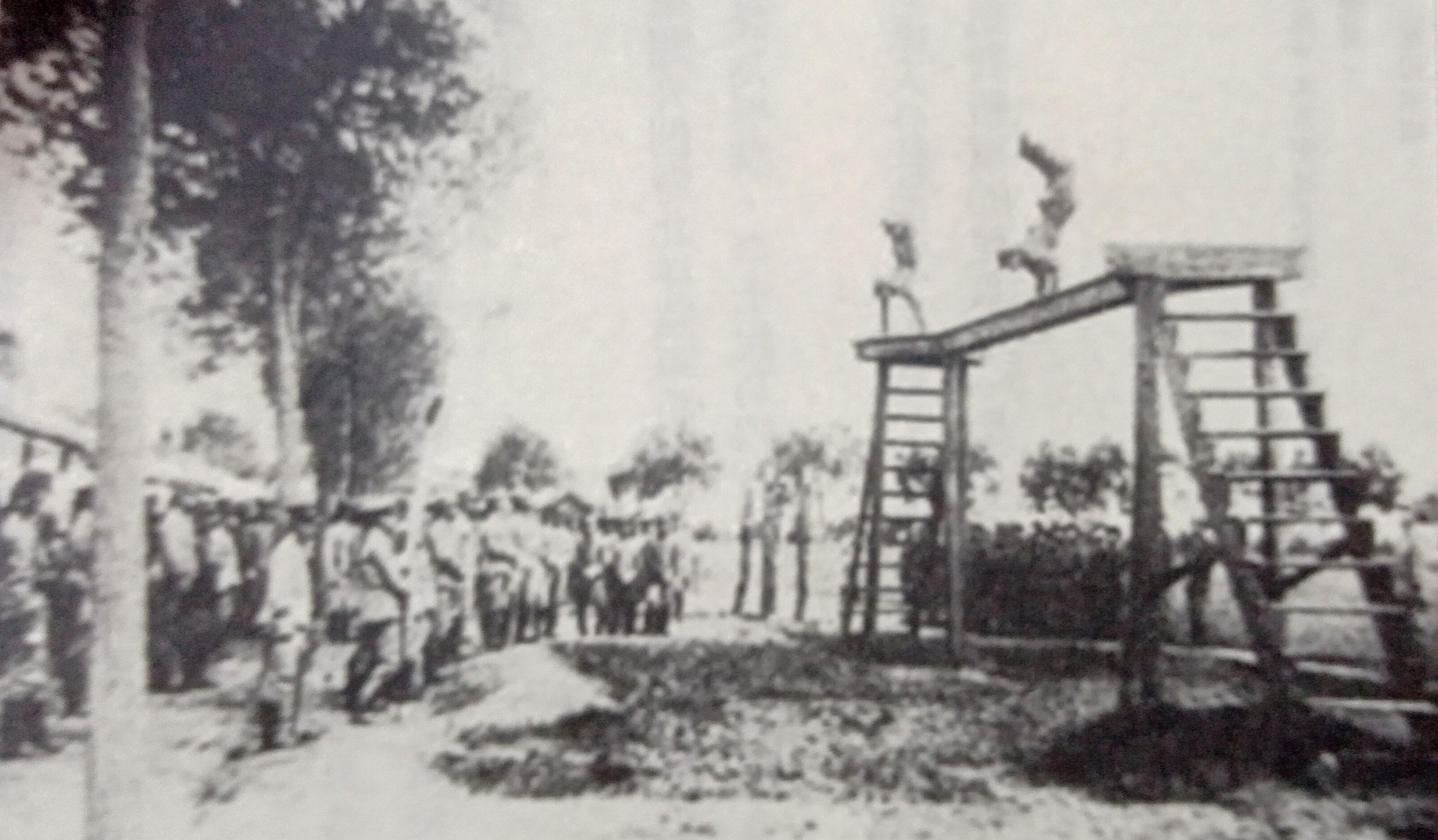
Beiyang troops training in 1902

In 1904–05 the Beiyang Army was expanded to a size of four divisions. The Metropolitan Banners Standing Army was redesignated as the 1st Division, while the Left Division of the Beiyang Standing Army became the 2nd Division. Some members of Zhang Zhidong's Self-Strengthening Army became the cadre of the 3rd Division, which was put together from the Tianjin police force founded by Yuan in 1902. The original New Field Army, which had been Right Division of the Guards Army, became the 4th Division. Later on in 1905, two more divisions were added, bringing the total to six. The 5th Division was created from elements of the Right Division in Shandong that fought against rebels during Boxer Rebellion, and the 6th Division was made from elements of the Left Division of the Guards Army and the Self-Strengthening Army. The designations of some these was changed several times. The six divisions together had about 60,000 men.

In addition, in 1902 several military schools were established in Zhili for the Beiyang Army by Yuan Shikai, including a two-year military academy (the Baoding Military Academy), a staff college, an NCO school, and a few specialized officer courses. The Baoding Academy became the largest military training school in China until after the 1920s and produced the majority of officers that served in Chinese armies over the next few decades. Yuan Shikai also sent many officer cadets to study in Japan, and while foreign-trained officers were a small fraction of the overall Chinese officer corps, they were a significant portion of Beiyang Army officers. The staff or war college was for senior officers and focused on higher level staff work, the necessity of which was made more clear by the massive armies that fought on both sides of the Russo-Japanese War, which required complex logistical management.

During this early period from 1901 to 1904, foreign observers noted that the quality of the soldier in the Beiyang Army was a noticeable improvement from the previous forces. More efficient drill and stronger discipline were among the changes. But these changes were mostly limited to the Beiyang Army. In the rest of the empire, no real effort was made to eliminate obsolete units, so the Chinese ground forces remained a mix of modernized and medieval forces. The New Army divisions that were equipped with Mauser and Krupp weaponry and took part in field maneuvers existed alongside traditional Banner, Green Standard, and local militia troops that still trained with matchlocks and long bows. The progress made in this period was still a major development compared to just several years earlier, and in September 1904 the imperial court approved a proposal from the Army Reorganization Bureau to create a standardized table of ranks and pay, organization, and system of supply and support, along with other policies to form the basis for 36 New Army divisions across China. The plan was officially announced in January 1905. Many of these suggestions were already in use by the Beiyang Army and were based on the Japanese system. However, it did not alter the balance of power between the provinces and the imperial government, allowing provincial governments to organize and finance the New Armies and have command over them except in major wars. These divisions were bureaucratic organizations rather than private armies of individual leaders.

In the fall of 1904 the Beiyang Army started holding field maneuvers involving the newly formed divisions. Held in Hejian, to the southeast of Baoding, in November 1904, these field maneuvers were China's first modern war game. There were a small number of foreign observers and they praised the performance of the Beiyang troops. Larger war games were held in October 1905 at the same location. The intended goal was to show both the Chinese public and the world that China now had a capable army. Foreign journalists and government officials from other parts of China were invited to watch the field maneuvers, which involved by some estimates as many as 50,000 troops, who were divided into two armies to stage a mock invasion of Zhili from Shandong. Infantry, artillery, cavalry, engineering, medical, veterinary, transportation, and telegraph units were involved. The event was praised by civilian officials and journalists, and although military observers were more critical, they noted that it was still a massive improvement since the Boxer Rebellion. The capability of the technical branches was still limited, despite the usage of the Beijing–Hankou railway to quickly move units for the first time. Officers were well trained but had some shortfalls, such as a lack of knowledge of their role and a lack of initiative, while the enlisted soldiers received the most praise for their higher military bearing and esprit de corps compared to the troops of the old-style armies. Later, the 1907 field maneuvers were also notable because they focused on training lower level officers, being carried out at the level of mixed brigades. Another change from the previous iterations was that Japanese military advisors were not involved in the planning or execution of the 1907 war game.

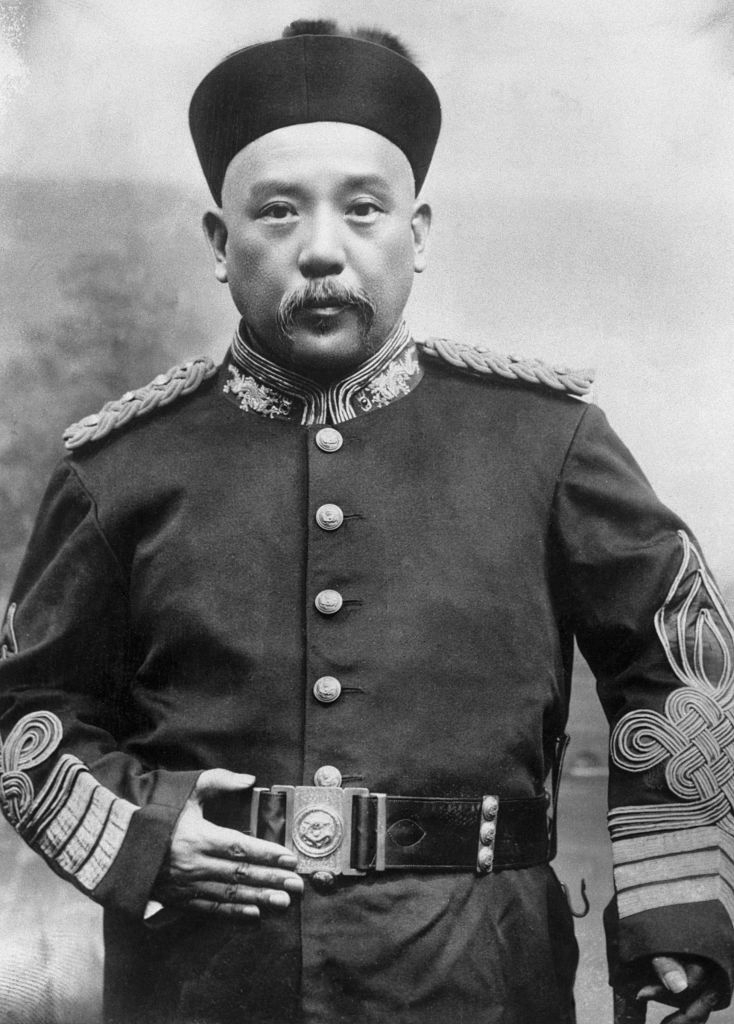
Yuan Shikai in the late Qing dynasty general uniform

Desertion among the Beiyang Army still occurred at a significant level, and some of that was among the conscripts that had been drafted from different parts of northern China. The Qing government officially did not have conscription, but it was practiced by the Beiyang Army. Decapitation was one punishment that was used for desertion. Yuan Shikai maintained strict discipline, but he tried to make sure that the troops received their pay on time. Officers were recruited on the basis of their education and ability rather than on personal connections, and eventually about half of the Beiyang Army officers were either from military schools other than Yuan's Baoding Military Academy, or, more often, had studied abroad, especially in Japan.

Yuan Shikai's influence up to this point reached its peak by 1906. The Beiyang Army had become the strongest military force of the Qing dynasty and was the largest of the New Armies created over the previous decade. Graduates of the officer schools that Yuan had set up in Zhili were sent back to their home provinces to lead New Army units there, and cadres from Beiyang divisions that were personally selected by him were used in other parts of the country to create new formations. Other Beiyang generals were given high ranks in the Green Standard Army or as commanders of provincial forces. The Army Reorganization Bureau was largely staffed by Yuan's associates, and he had allies in the form of the Empress Dowager and Prince Qing. However, he also had many enemies in both the imperial court and the provinces because of his past intrigues and new rivalries. These included conservative Manchu nobles that were suspicious of his power and other provincial governors who had to fund his Beiyang Army with their tax revenue.

His rivals struck in the fall of 1906, during debates over administrative reforms to the military bureaucracy. He and Prince Qing were accused of corruption and abuse of power by Tieliang, their former ally, and Grand Councilor Qu Hongji. Tieliang had previously assisted Yuan in building the Beiyang Army, but turned against him for several reasons. After this Yuan himself requested that the Empress Dowager reduce his power by transferring four of the six Beiyang divisions from his command as Viceroy of Zhili to the newly formed Ministry of the Army, which replaced the Army Reorganization Bureau. However, except for in the 1st Division, some of the senior officers were more loyal to Yuan than to the Banner officer Fengshan, who had been appointed by Tieliang to lead the Beiyang divisions under the Ministry of the Army, and they resigned. The decline in Yuan Shikai's position was only temporary, because in September 1907 he was appointed to the Grand Council and was made the Minister of Foreign Affairs. Although his direct control over the Beiyang Army was reduced, some of Yuan's close allies were appointed as commanders of units sent to the Manchurian or Jiangsu provinces, or to key posts in the Ministry of the Army. After the death of Empress Dowager Cixi and the Guangxu Emperor in November 1908, the Prince Regent of the new young emperor, Prince Chun, initially worked with him, but on 2 January 1909 he had Yuan dismissed from his posts and retired, ostensibly for medical reasons.

=== List of original Beiyang divisions ===
- 1st Division – Founded in December 1902 with Manchu Bannermen that were sent for Yuan Shikai to train by the Qing court. It was intended to replace the semi-modern Manchu Banner units that had been destroyed during the Boxer Rebellion. It was not intended to be an official imperial palace guard but it was able to serve in that capacity, and in 1907 it was transferred from Baoding to Beijing to replace the 6th Division in that role. With the exception of a few Han Chinese officers on its staff, most of the division came from the Metropolitan Banners or the Banner garrisons in other parts of north China. The 1st Division was eventually replaced in its role at the palace by a separate Imperial Guards Division in 1911.
- 2nd Division – Founded in October 1902 as the Left Division of the Beiyang Standing Army. Part of the 2nd Division was used to form the 2nd Mixed Brigade in 1907, which was sent to Manchuria.
- 3rd Division – In 1904–05 this designation was briefly given to the former Right Division of the Wuwei Corps until it was renumbered. Starting from 1905 the 3rd Division was formed from the Tianjin police force that Yuan Shikai had established in 1902, after the foreign powers imposed on China the rule that no military forces could be stationed in or around the city. It also reportedly used a cadre from Zhang Zhidong's Self-Strengthening Army. In 1907 the 3rd Division was sent to Manchuria.
- 4th Division – From 1905 it was Yuan Shikai's original New Field Army from 1895, which had also been the Right Division of the Wuwei Corps. Part of the 4th Division was used to form the 2nd Mixed Brigade in 1907, which was sent to Manchuria.
- 5th Division – Founded in 1905 with the vanguard of the Right Division of the Wuwei Corps in Shandong. Part of the 5th Division was used to form the 1st Mixed Brigade in 1907, which was sent to Manchuria.
- 6th Division – Reportedly included the former Left Division of the Wuwei Corps and a brigade of the Self-Strengthening Army. The Left Division had been used in Beijing to protect the emperor's family after the Boxer Rebellion, and after it became part of the new 6th Division in 1905 the entire unit was rotated through there, until it was relieved by the 1st Division in 1907. Also that year, part of the 6th Division was used to form the 1st Mixed Brigade, which was sent to Manchuria.

The following divisions were outside of the Beiyang Army in Zhili province, but were founded with cadres of Beiyang troops:

- 7th Division – It was created in 1906 from the Beiyang Army's 13th Brigade, which had been deployed outside of Zhili, to Jiangsu province, in 1905.
- 20th Division – Formed in 1909 in Fengtien province, Manchuria, on the basis of the 1st Mixed Brigade from the Beiyang Army.

== The Beiyang Army under Qing control (1909–1910) ==
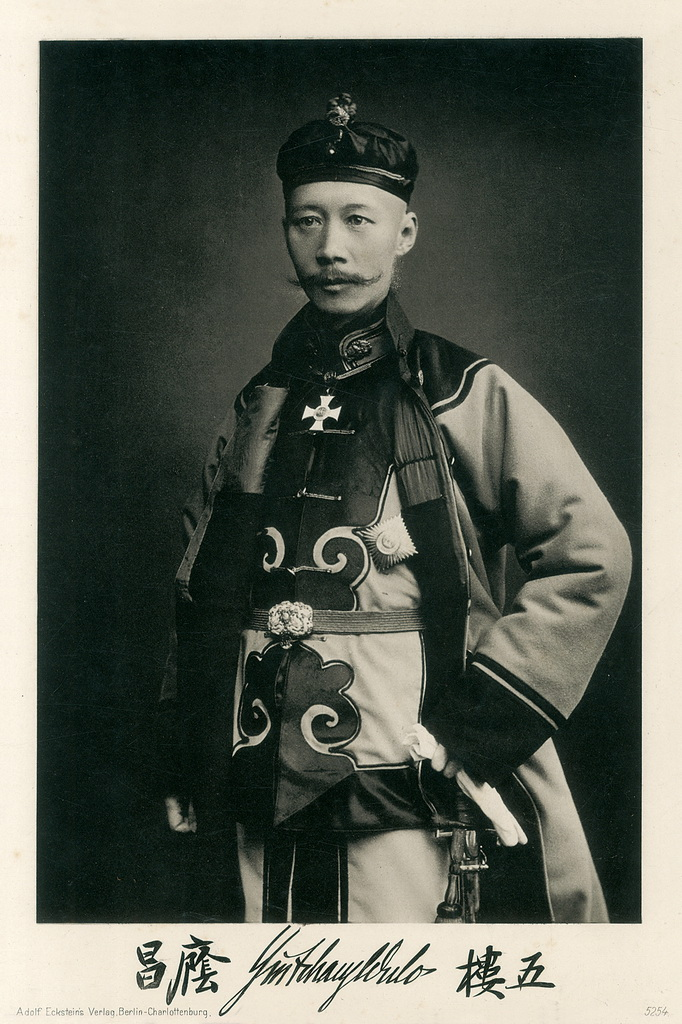
Yinchang around the time that he took command of the Beiyang Army

After the dismissal of Yuan Shikai in January 1909 by Prince Chun, the Prince Regent of the recently enthroned Xuantong Emperor, some of his proteges were still left in key positions by the Qing government. During this time four Beiyang divisions were under the direct command of the Ministry of the Army while the others were under provincial governors. Prince Chun brought the rest of the military under the control of Manchu princes. In the summer of 1909 he named the emperor the commander-in-chief of the armed forces, a position that he held in an acting capacity as his regent, and appointed inexperienced princes to lead the Ministry of the Army, the Navy Bureau, and the General Staff Council. He declared that the emperor was the commander-in-chief another two times between then and the outbreak of the 1911 Revolution, as an effort to promote unity, patriotism and a military spirit. At the same time there were increased revolts and mutinies among New Army soldiers, caused by a range of issues, including the spread of revolutionary propaganda. In 1908 and 1910 there were significant uprisings that led to brigades or divisions being disbanded and rebuilt entirely. But these events happened mostly outside of northern China and the Beiyang Army remained unaffected by the disturbances. The revolutionary support was strongest in the areas south of the Yangtze river.

All of the Beiyang senior commanders remained loyal to the Qing dynasty, and to some extent to Yuan Shikai, who remained in contact with several officers. Duan Qirui, Feng Guozhang, and Wang Shizhen were examples of senior commanders that had personal loyalty to Yuan. But some of the senior officers had served in the military bureaucracy of the central government or in provincial governments, developing their own connections, and after Yuan was dismissed from his posts he could no longer assist them with their own advancement. The Qing government had also given senior Beiyang officers traditional ranks in the Green Standard and Banner forces and had used Beiyang divisions as a palace guard. Others were much older and were loyal to the monarchy more than to Yuan Shikai. Among the junior officers, because Yuan chose to recruit them based on merit, many were from military schools outside of north China, or had studied abroad, and therefore were less likely to have personal loyalty to him. The Japanese-trained officers were the most likely to have anti-Qing and anti-Yuan views. After he was eventually called back by the imperial court, Yuan immediately removed several officers from command. The Beiyang Army, unlike the older Huai Army founded by Li Hongzhang, was a bureaucratic organization with regular rotations of officers in command positions, appointment based on education and merit, and with funding being provided by the government instead of by an individual official. Among ordinary soldiers of the Beiyang Army there was no widespread political sentiment, but there was resentment due to the strict discipline and poor living conditions.

In late 1910 the German-trained Manchu noble Yinchang became the Minister of the Army. Right away, he placed all six original Beiyang Army divisions under the direct command of the Ministry, although only four of them were in Zhili. The 3rd Division was left stationed in Manchuria and the 5th was in Shandong. He also dismissed Fengshan, who had been unpopular among the troops, and became the commander of the Beiyang Army.

== The 1911 Revolution ==
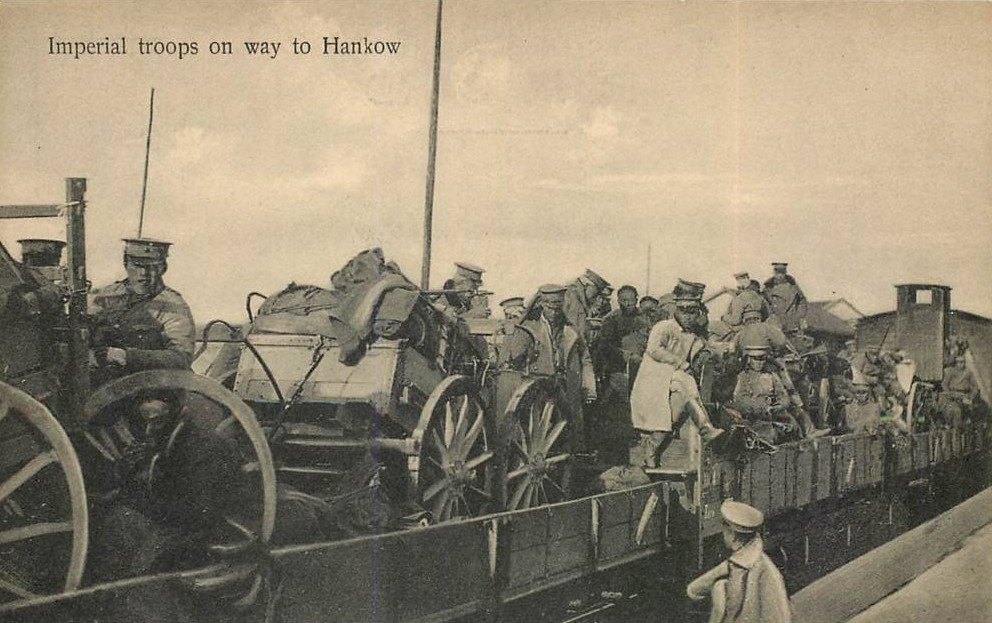
Beiyang troops sent to put down the uprising

The regency in the final years of the Qing dynasty proved to be incapable of solving the challenges in China and faced growing ethnic resentment against the Manchus as well as revolutionary agitation against the monarchy, which became stronger after the election of provincial assembles in 1909. Its measures in response to the demands from the elected assemblies and from the provinces were seen as inadequate, and the central government's nationalization of the railroads led to an uprising in the province of Sichuan in September 1911. This was followed by a mutiny of New Army units starting on 10 October 1911 in Wuchang, one of the three cities that now forms Wuhan, in the province of Hubei. By the 12th, most of the Hubei New Army joined the rebels and had declared one of their officers, Li Yuanhong, the leader of a revolutionary military government, which was also joined by some local civilian leaders. Wuchang, Hanyang, and Hankou had completely fallen, and the Manchu viceroy of Hubei and Hunan, who had to flee the tri-cities on a boat, sent a message to Beijing asking for "crack troops" to be deployed. After meeting with his military leaders on the same day, including Zaitao and Yulang at the General Staff Council, Navy Minister Zaizhen, and Army Minister Yinchang, Prince Chun ordered Yinchang to lead the ground campaign against the uprising and the navy commander-in-chief, Admiral Sa Zhenbing, to take the ships of the fleet at Shanghai up the Yangtze river to assist the army.

Yuan Shikai, living in retirement, was asked to return. He turned down the offer of becoming the viceroy of Hubei and having joint command over the troops with Yinchang, but he did start giving them advice. When the uprising broke out there were several Beiyang Army divisions preparing to take part in the fall 1911 field maneuvers not far from Beijing. In addition to these there was also a mixed brigade from the 20th Division and the entire new Imperial Guards Division, which was under the Prince Regent's direct command. On 14 October they were informed that the war games were cancelled and were reorganized into three corps (sometimes translated as armies): the 1st Corps to be led by Yinchang against the rebels, consisting of the 4th Division and one brigade each from the 2nd and 6th, the 2nd Corps led by Feng Guozhang to act as a reserve, with the mixed brigade and the 3rd and 5th Divisions that were not in the area at the time, and the 3rd Corps led by Zaitao to defend Beijing using the Manchu divisions, the 1st and the Imperial Guards. Using a section of the Beijing–Shenyang railway and then the Beijing–Hankou railway, the 1st Corps was rapidly deployed to the front near Wuhan, and its first elements arrived on the 15th. The 4th Division, the main force, arrived on the 21st, and Yinchang set up his command post at Xiaogan on the 23rd, about 45 miles away from Hankou.

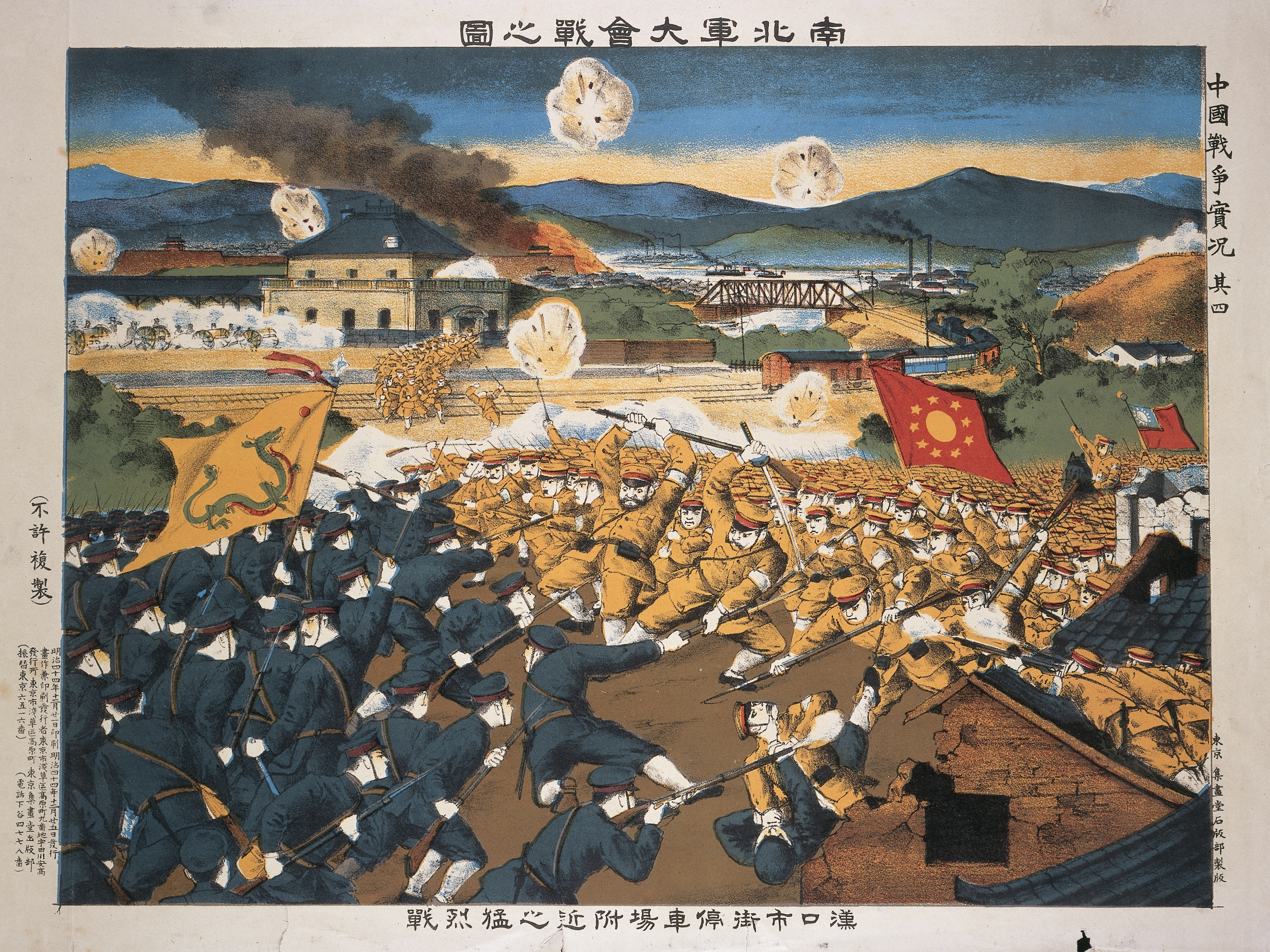
The Beiyang Army fights revolutionary soldiers

The Beiyang troops and the naval force that arrived around that time, the latter including one cruiser (the Hai Chen) and several gunboats, began their assault on Wuhan on 27 October. Even though they were ready earlier, there was a delay in launching the attack for unclear reasons. One possible reason was that Yinchang's subordinates were waiting for Yuan Shikai to return and take command. Yuan, who had been in negotiations with the Qing government, was named the commissioner of all forces in Hubei on the 27th and Yinchang was recalled to Beijing, while Feng Guozhang was named 1st Corps commander and Duan Qirui replaced him at the 2nd Corps. The ground assault was led by the 4th Division under acting commander Wang Yujia and Wang Zhanyuan's 3rd Brigade, moving south along the Beijing-Hankou railway. Advancing with support from their artillery and the naval guns of the warships, the Beiyang Army pushed back the rebel troops in three days and reached the end of the line. Yinchang departed for Beijing on the 30th as imperial troops completed their takeover of Hankou. But when Feng Guozhang led an attack against some holdouts, a series of explosions caused by artillery damaged much of the city, and when the fighting ended as much as three-quarters of Hankou had been leveled, according to one account. By 1 November the remaining revolutionaries abandoned Hankou for Hanyang on the other side of the river.

At this point Yuan ordered Feng Guozhang to temporarily stop his attack before entering Hanyang, even though Admiral Sa wanted to continue, ostensibly because the army needed to rest. Yuan wanted to use this as leverage to negotiate with the Qing, because by the time Hankou was retaken major uprisings had broken out in other parts of the empire, including political threats from the 20th Division commander near Beijing. A session of the National Assembly was convened in late October and they also made demands. Under this pressure, in early November Prince Chun appointed Yuan Shikai as prime minister, having dismissed Prince Qing and his Manchu princes' cabinet. When several Beiyang officers of the 6th Division attempted to join the rebel side, Yuan quickly had them removed, and the 20th Division was brought under control, restoring order within the Beiyang Army. He also shifted units around northern China to stabilize the situation and prevent any uprisings at important locations. Having consolidated his military power in the north, and with his Beiyang Army remaining the core of the royalist forces, Yuan then pressured Prince Chun to resign as imperial regent in early December.

Meanwhile, the naval crews, who were sympathetic to the revolutionaries, allowed many of the rebel soldiers to cross the river from Hankou to Hanyang, and on 12 November the navy defected to their side. After a rebel counterattack at Hankou was fought off on the 17th, on the 20th Feng Guozhang sent his forces into Hanyang on pontoon bridges built by his engineers, and the Beiyang Army took control of the entire city on the 27th despite strong opposition from the rebels. By the time this was done, Yuan Shikai was in negotiations with revolutionaries and told Feng to not advance on Wuchang. This ended the Beiyang Army's role in the fighting, and the army had demonstrated that its leadership, organization, and training was better than that of the revolutionary forces, which, despite their bravery, were a poorly organized mix of local New Army troops and a large number of new volunteer units that were raised by the revolutionaries in October and November. Because several provinces were in open rebellion by this point, among other factors, Yuan Shikai started talks for a political solution with Li Yuanhong, who was more interested after the weapons arsenal at Hanyang was captured by the Beiyang Army. Being in an advantageous position compared to both the Manchu imperial court and the internally divided republicans, in large part because of his control over the army, Yuan was able to reach a deal. Sun Yat-sen, who had recently been elected president of a republican provisional government in Nanjing, agreed to resign in Yuan's favor if he secured the abdication of the emperor. While this was going on, in January 1912 a memorial to the throne signed by several generals stated that the loyalty of their troops to the Qing dynasty was no longer reliable. The imperial court largely acquiesced to all of this, and Empress Dowager Longyu issued the abdication on behalf of the young emperor on 12 February 1912.

=== Structure during the Wuchang Uprising ===
The structure of the Beiyang forces that were mobilized to fight the revolutionary uprising in Hubei was as follows.

The three corps are sometimes translated as "army" in English sources.

- 1st Corps (Yinchang, later Feng Guozhang)
  - 4th Division (Wu Fengling, later Wang Yujia (acting) and Chen Guangyuan)
  - 3rd Brigade (Wang Zhanyuan) – of the 2nd Division
  - 11th Brigade (Li Chun) – of the 6th Division
- 2nd Corps (Feng Guozhang, later Duan Qirui)
  - 5th Division (Zhang Yongcheng)
  - 5th Brigade (Lu Yongxiang) – of the 3rd Division
  - 39th Brigade (Wu Zhenxiang) – of the 20th Division
  - 2nd Mixed Brigade (Wang Ruxian, later Lan Tianwei) – of the 2nd and 4th Divisions
- 3rd Corps (Zaitao)
  - 1st Division (He Zonglian)
  - Imperial Guards Division (Zaifeng, Prince Chun)

In the last weeks of the Qing dynasty Yuan Shikai removed Manchu princes from positions of power, and at the end of 1911 he recalled Feng Guozhang to Beijing to appoint him as commander of the 3rd Corps. This was due to Feng being on good terms with the Manchu officers from his previous experience and his royalist sympathies. The Imperial Guards would become the foundation of Feng's power. Duan Qirui assumed command of the 1st Corps on the Hubei front.

== Beiyang clique in power (1912–1915) ==
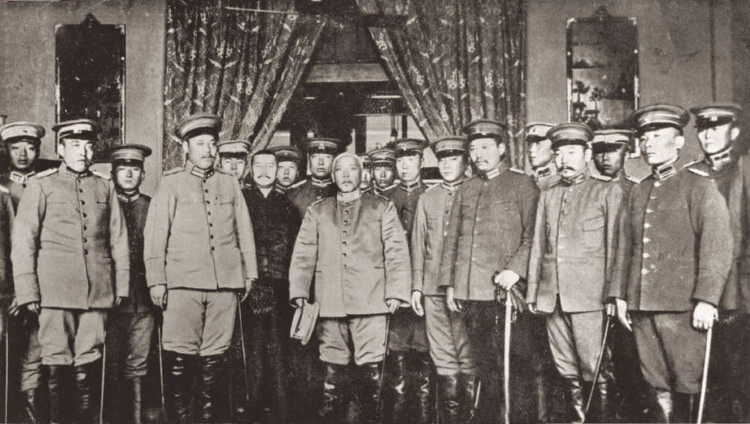
Beiyang generals at the inauguration of Yuan Shikai (center)

Yuan Shikai was sworn in as the provisional president of the Republic of China on 10 March 1912, but there was no agreement among the different political forces in China about the exact form of government the new republic would have or how political power should be divided. One of the disputes that emerged was on the question of federalism, between supporters of autonomy for the provinces and those who wanted a strong central government. The disagreement was made more complicated by the decentralized command structure of the former Qing dynasty's military forces, and their involvement in the 1911 Revolution set a precedent for the army to a have larger role in politics. As president, Yuan Shikai took actions to create a strong national government at the expense of the provinces and to create a strong presidency. He attempted to limit the power of revolutionary military governors that had emerged in 1911, and to enforce his decisions he started using the Beiyang Army, which was designated the main "national" army. This designation meant that they were directly controlled by the Ministry of War and were to receive better and more reliable pay, at least in theory.

The first major challenge that Yuan Shikai and his generals dealt with was the Second Revolution in 1913. The Kuomintang, supported by revolutionary activists, won the most seats in the election for the National Assembly that began in 1913 and tried to limit the power of the presidency within a parliamentary republic. Yuan moved to protect his power. In March 1913 Kuomintang leader Song Jiaoren was assassinated by his agents, and in April he obtained a large foreign loan to fund the Beiyang Army in the event of losing revenue from other provinces. After that he ordered the governors of the provinces with the largest armies to be removed from office. When he had the Beiyang Army enforce his order in the province of Jiangxi, its leadership declared independence from Yuan's administration in July 1913. It was followed by another six provinces, but the revolutionary forces were weak compared to the Beiyang Army, and most of them collapsed before the end of August. At the same time Yuan banned the KMT, issued a constitution creating a powerful presidency, replaced the national parliament, dissolved local parliaments, and removed independent governors who were within the reach of the Beiyang Army. In less than two years after the end of the imperial regime, Yuan Shikai and his subordinates, including both military commanders and government bureaucrats, emerged as the dominant force in Chinese politics. They were referred to as the "Beiyang clique." They controlled the Beiyang government in Beijing, which remained the internationally recognized government of all of China, but its ability to enforce decisions became dependent on military power and the cooperation of governors and local commanders.

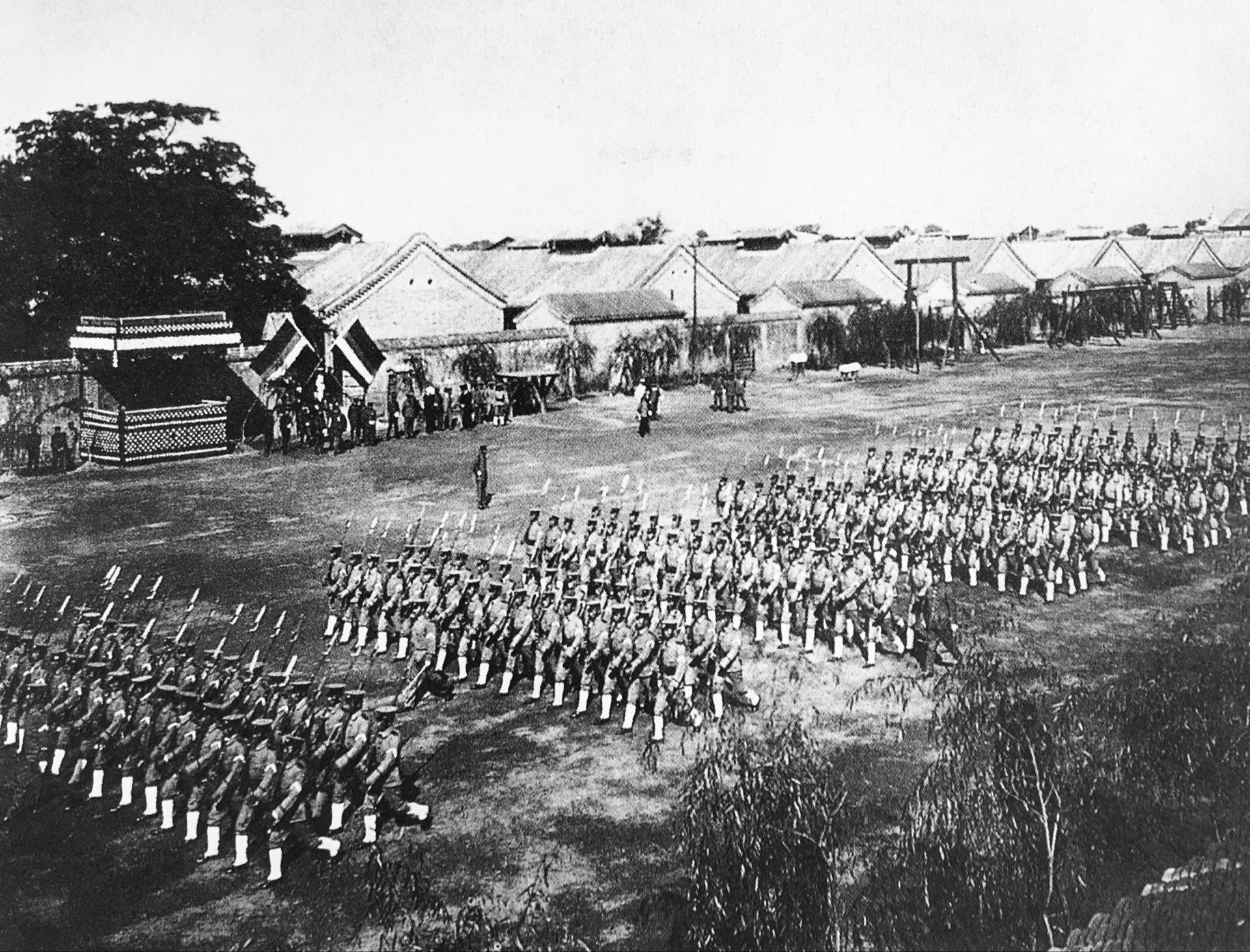
The Beiyang Army in the early 1910s

The six divisions of the Beiyang Army, although having the most potential to provide the core of a national army, were not enough for Yuan Shikai to exert power over provinces outside of northern China. As Beiyang generals were sent by Yuan to restore control over other parts of the country, starting with the Second Revolution in 1913, they used their existing troops as cadres to establish new units locally. A typical example of this was Wang Zhanyuan, the commander of the Beiyang 2nd Division, which was sent into Hubei by Yuan Shikai in 1913. Using officers from his unit he was able to raise another division and seven brigades. In addition to these there were the original Hubei provincial troops and more Beiyang forces that later ended up there. After several years, the troops under the command of Wang Zhanyuan numbered over 100,000 men. Even before the outbreak of the Second Revolution, Yuan Shikai started building up between 30,000 and 40,000 Beiyang government troops in Hubei, which were later used to bring central Chinese provinces into his sphere of influence. These included Cao Kun's Beiyang 3rd Division and a brigade of the 20th Division from Fengtien. Cao was named commander of the upper Yangtze defenses in 1914, with his forces spread over Hunan and Hubei. This was one of the two armies mobilized by Yuan against the Second Revolution, with the other one being led by Feng Guozhang. Other units were deployed to Jiangxi, Jiangsu, and Anhui, being under the overall command of Feng Guozhang, who became governor of Jiangsu in late 1913 after his troops captured Nanjing.

Another significant change to the Beiyang Army in the early Republic was the end of the Qing practice of rotating officers. Yuan Shikai kept division commanders and their subordinate officers in the same divisions for several years, which enabled them to begin turning their units into a personal network and power base under their control. Yuan's relationship with the Beiyang generals and other northern commanders who also became his subordinates was a form of clientelism, and he used his position as president to provide them with power, including increased personal control over military units. Although Yuan planned to create a national army of fifty divisions, and all of China's military forces pleged their loyalty to his regime, he was not able to centralize the armed forces within a bureaucratic and less personalized framework. This arrangement functioned effectively as long as Yuan had power, but it began breaking down when in 1915–16 his authority faced a more serious challenge than the Second Revolution had been a couple years earlier. In the rest of the country, outside of his Beiyang and other "central army" forces in northern China, the military command structure remained decentralized, as it had been during the Qing dynasty.

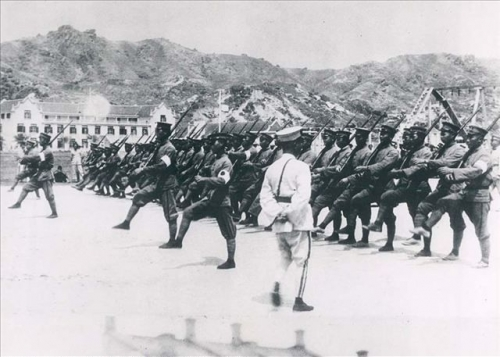
The Beiyang Army in the 1910s

Overall, Duan Qirui and Feng Guozhang emerged as the top commanders of the Beiyang Army besides Yuan himself. Duan became the second most powerful figure in the Beiyang clique by 1914, serving as both Premier and the Minister of War. The latter position gave him more influence over the Beiyang Army because he controlled the promotion of officers. However, in the following year Yuan retook control of the military and removed Duan from his posts. He continued the process of centralizing government power by starting preparations in August 1915 to restore the monarchy in China with himself as emperor. Much of his earlier support was due to him maintaining order, but this was seen as going to far. The monarchical restoration revealed the disagreements among the Beiyang Army's high ranking officers. Both Duan and Feng Guozhang, the latter commanding Beiyang forces in Nanjing, openly opposed Yuan's decision. Feng's headquarters at Nanjing became a meeting point for Beiyang officers that were against the return of the monarchy. Feng, as the governor of Jiangsu, was in charge of one of China's wealthiest provinces, and resisted Yuan's attempt to remove him from his power base by declining to take up his offer of becoming the chief of the general staff in Beijing.

This was especially a problem for Yuan as the National Protection War broke out, with the province of Yunnan declaring independence from his dictatorship in December 1915, soon followed by Guizhou and others. These provinces had their own forces and were the least influenced by the central government. Their forces launched attacks against the Beiyang Army in Hunan and Sichuan, and the borders of those provinces became the front line. Neither side could gain a clear advantage in the fighting, despite the arrival of Beiyang reinforcements. Cao Kun was appointed the overall commander of the campaign, with his 3rd Division being sent to the Sichuan-Yunnan border. But some of the northern officers were reluctant to fight for Yuan's monarchy, and the Beiyang Army was unable to defeat the initial uprising. A local ceasefire was negotiated in Sichuan. Duan Qirui agreed to Yuan's request to return to service after he pledged to restore the republic in March 1916, but that concession was not enough for the rebels, and more provinces declared independence. It became clear the northern forces could not win outright. Beiyang troops ended up abandoning Hunan as the province was taken over by local rebels and the Guangxi provincial army, which happened around the same time that the war was resolved by the death of Yuan Shikai from natural causes in June 1916.

Yuan's attempt to make himself emperor began the transition into the Warlord Era. Besides causing the final break between the central government and the military governors in the southern provinces, it created the opportunity for the Beiyang and other northern generals to begin acting independently for their own political interests. They were more concerned with preserving their own power than Yuan's position. Examples of these include Wang Zhanyuan in Hubei and Zhang Zuolin in Fengtien, who used their leverage to get Yuan to grant them authority over the civil administration in their provinces, giving them direct control over the funding of their military forces. The reliance on military force by both sides also had the effect of making the already weak civilian institutions of the Beiyang government largely irrelevant.

== Fragmentation of the Beiyang Army (1916–1918) ==
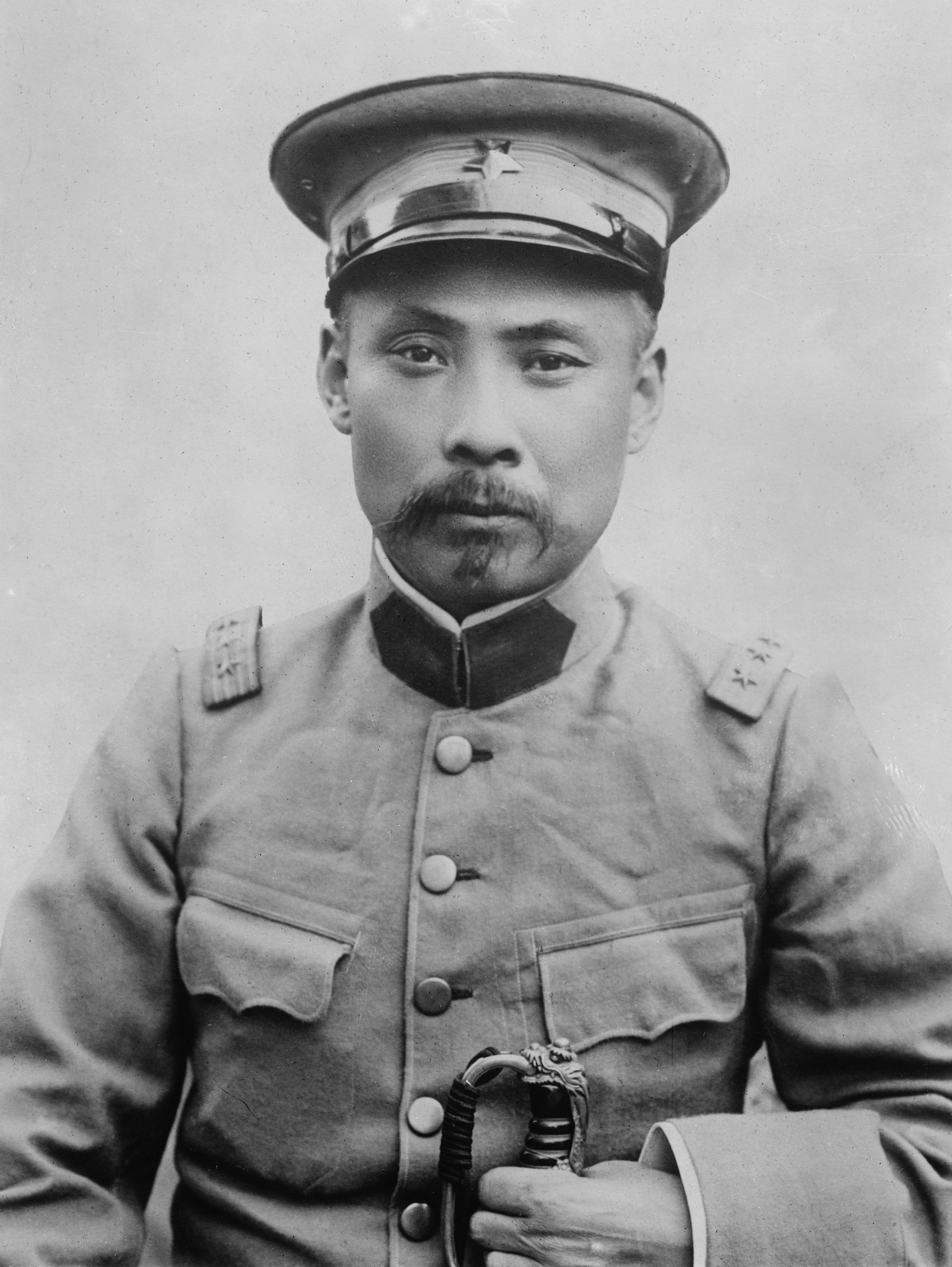
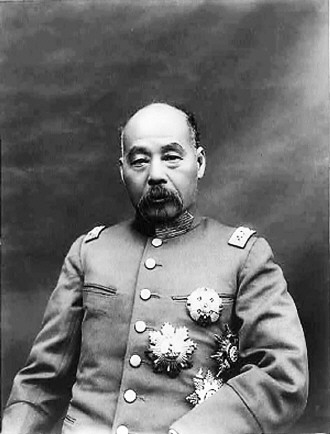
Duan Qirui (left) and Feng Guozhang were the highest ranking Beiyang generals.

The death of Yuan Shikai ended the National Protection War. In Beijing, his vice president and the original revolutionary leader from 1911, Li Yuanhong, took his place as the head of state on 7 June 1916. Li was seen as a potential mediator between the two factions in the war, and he restored the constitution and the National Assembly that Yuan had suppressed, but was unable to resolve the larger question of the distribution of power between the branches of government and the provinces. Duan Qirui and Feng Guozhang became the premier and vice president, due to the importance of the Beiyang Army. Duan assumed command of the Beiyang Army, although there was also a growing rivalry between him and Feng for control. This began to split the Beiyang Army between their respective factions, the Anhui clique and the Zhili clique. (Note: The cliques were named after the native provinces of their leaders.) The southern provinces remained in a dispute with the Beijing government over constitutional issues, and this began a period of north-south division in China. The northern provinces were under the former Beiyang clique, but neither side was fully unified. Besides Feng, Duan also had to contend with President Li and the parliament.

In the first half of 1917 the question of China's participation in World War I caused a series of events that ended with Duan Qirui seizing full control of the government. Although China had been neutral, following the German announcement of unrestricted submarine warfare and the United States declaring war on Germany in January and April 1917, respectively, there was pressure from the U.S. and the Allied Powers for China to enter the war as well. Duan wanted to use this to his advantage, but disputes between him and the parliament prevented this from happening. President Li dismissed Duan as premier in May 1917, causing his military allies to threaten Beijing, while the general Zhang Xun offered to mediate. Duan allowed him to pass through his territory to enter Beijing, but when Zhang declared the restoration of the Qing dynasty on 1 July, the Beiyang Army under Duan quickly captured the city from his troops to end the restoration. Now that Li had been removed and the parliament was dissolved, Duan declared war on Germany on 16 August. He became the premier while Feng replaced Li as president. With the Beiyang Army back in power, they set about restoring control over the south. At the same time Duan was able to reach an agreement with Japan for a loan to fund his government and the Beiyang Army.

October 1916 Beiyang Army field maneuvers
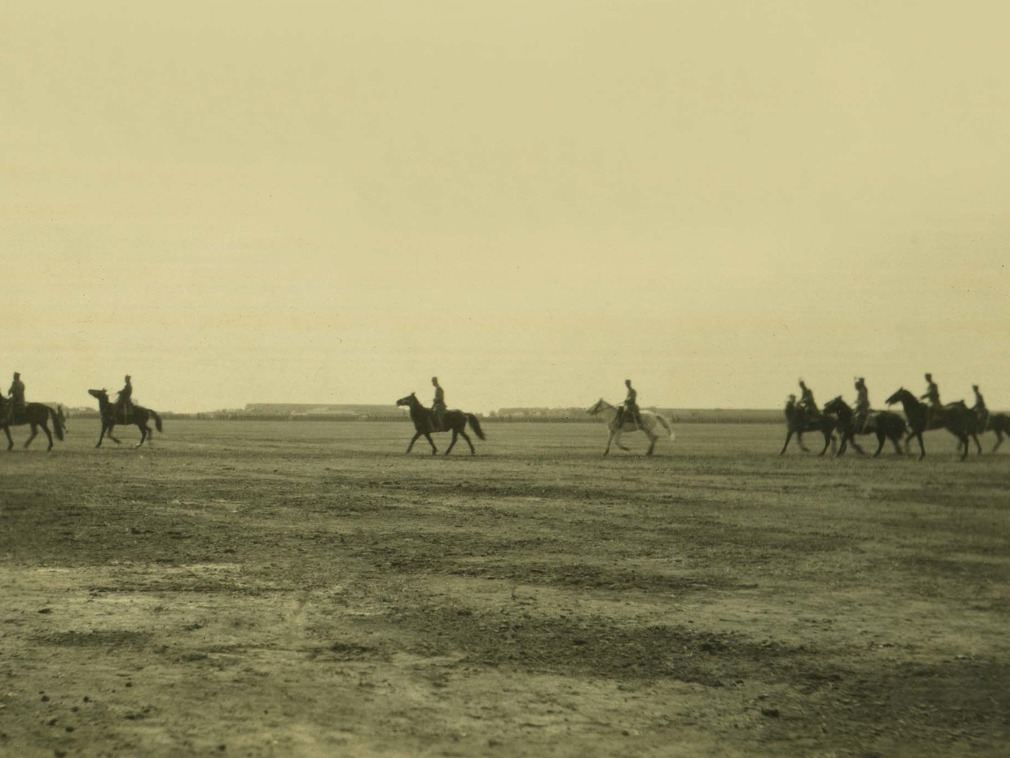
President Li Yuanhong reviewing the troops

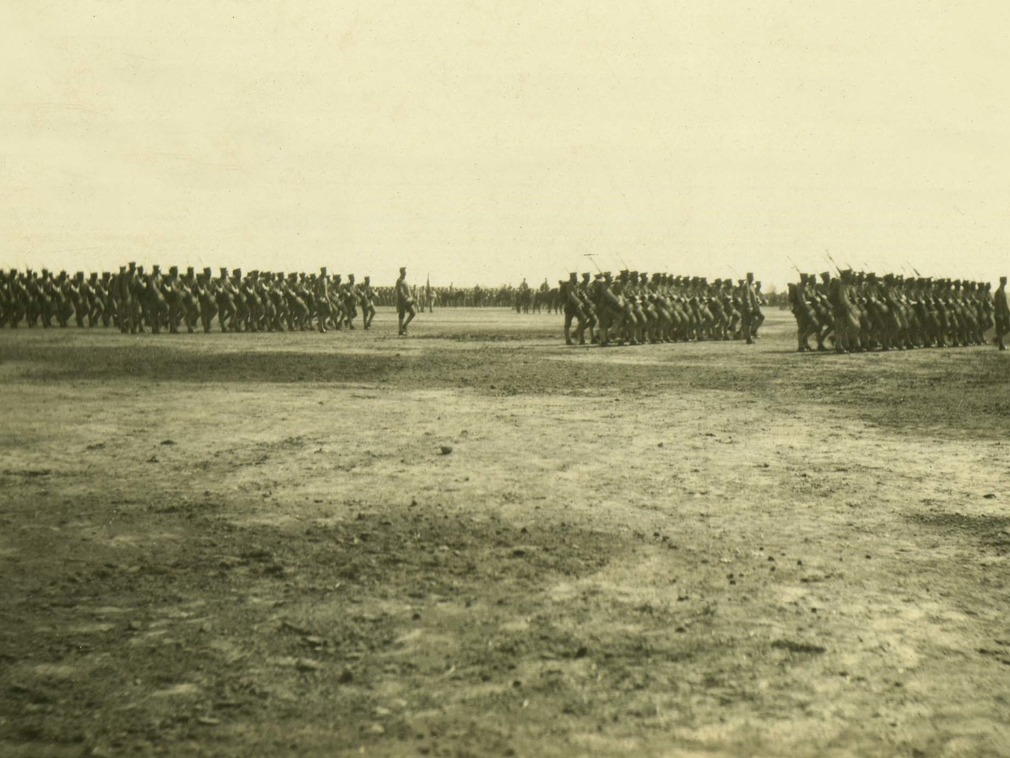
Infantry

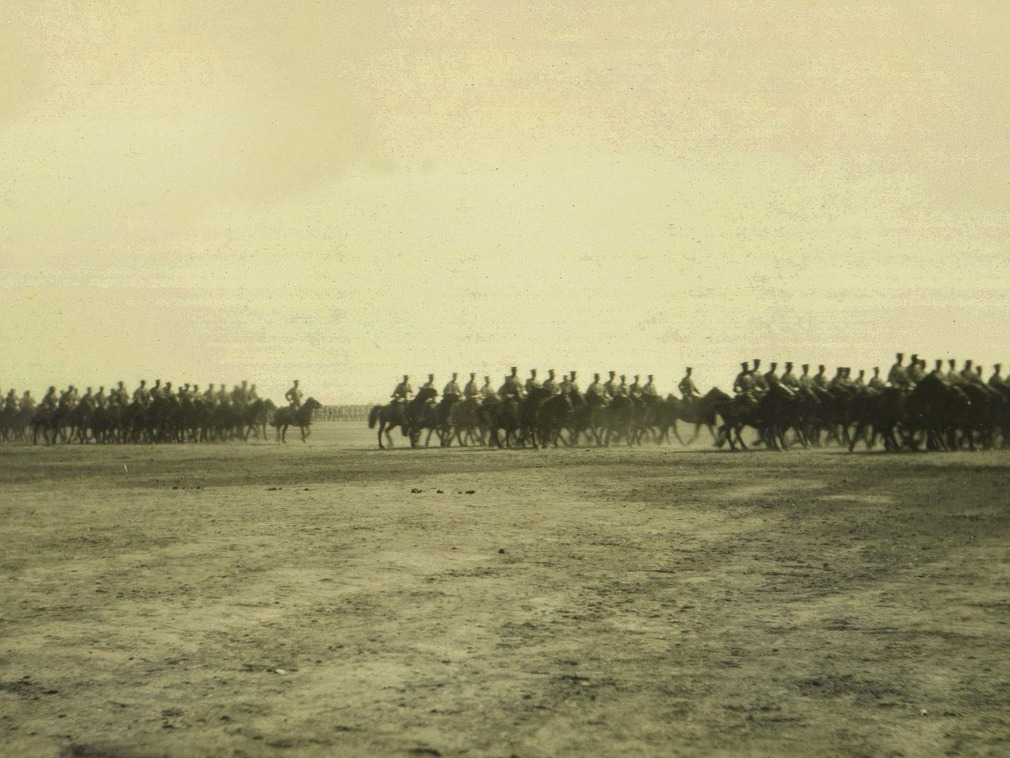
Cavalry

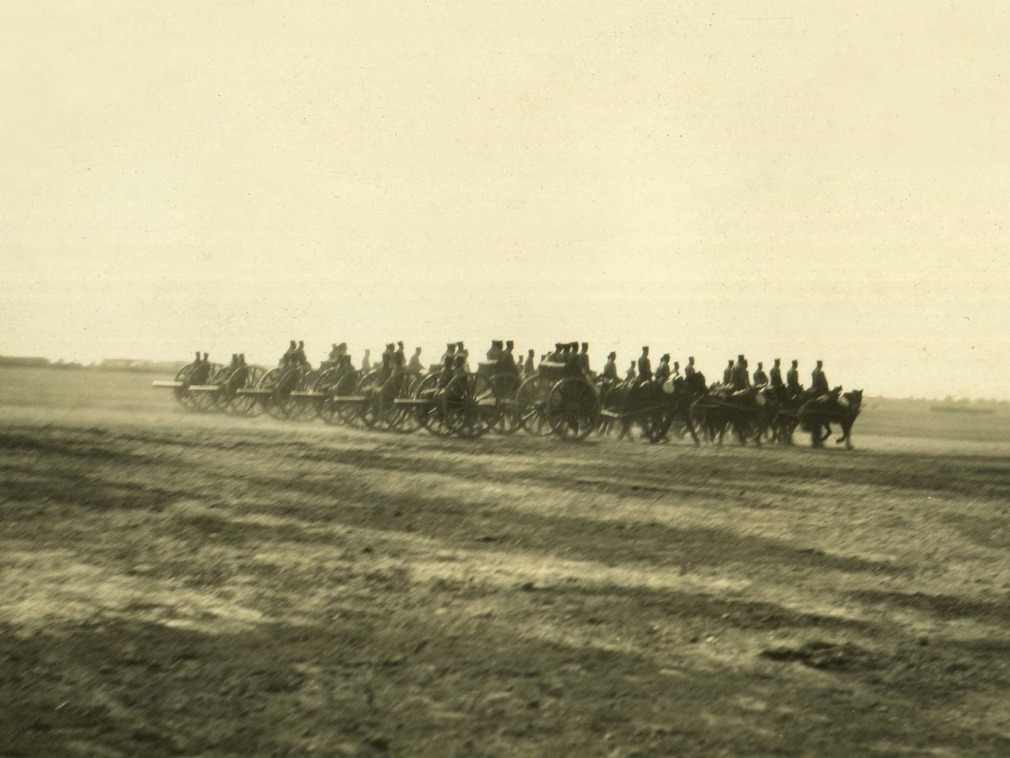
Artillery

Preparations for the Beiyang campaign against the south began in July 1917 when 150,000 troops were moved into Hunan, and another force entered Sichuan. Sun Yat-sen formed an alternative government in Guangzhou, with the backing of some southern warlords, other politicians, and the Chinese Navy. The southern provinces used their armies to resist the Beiyang invasion, with war breaking out as Guangxi and Guangdong clique troops entered Hunan in October to remove the northern forces. Feng Guozhang opposed another civil war, and his call for Duan to end the fighting was joined by the military governors of other central Chinese provinces. Duan's field commanders were already reluctant to commit their forces to assert his control over Hunan and withdrew their troops, causing Duan to resign as premier on 16 November 1917. The increasing autonomy of individual commanders within the "national" Beiyang Army meant that it was no longer an effective centralizing force as it had been during Yuan's dictatorship.

Duan spent the fall of 1917 trying to win support from other Beiyang commanders to continue the war against the south, while the southern movement was also split between the pro-war Sun Yat-sen and those that wanted to negotiate with Beijing. In the meantime, Duan obtained a loan from the Japanese ostensibly to build a "War Participation Army" for World War I, but used the funds to strengthen his domestic position. He figured that he could use the new force he was building up near Beijing to influence politics in the capital. Wu Peifu and Zhang Jingyao led a successful takeover of Hunan in March and April 1918 with 150,000 troops, but Wu felt his achievement was not rewarded by Duan and refused to advance further. Wu's superior Cao Kun, who controlled an important section of the Beijing–Hankou railway used to move troops from north China to the front in Hunan, remained neutral. This effectively ended the north–south war, beginning the stage of internal power struggles in both the Beiyang Army and the southern forces.

== High warlordism (1919–1925) ==
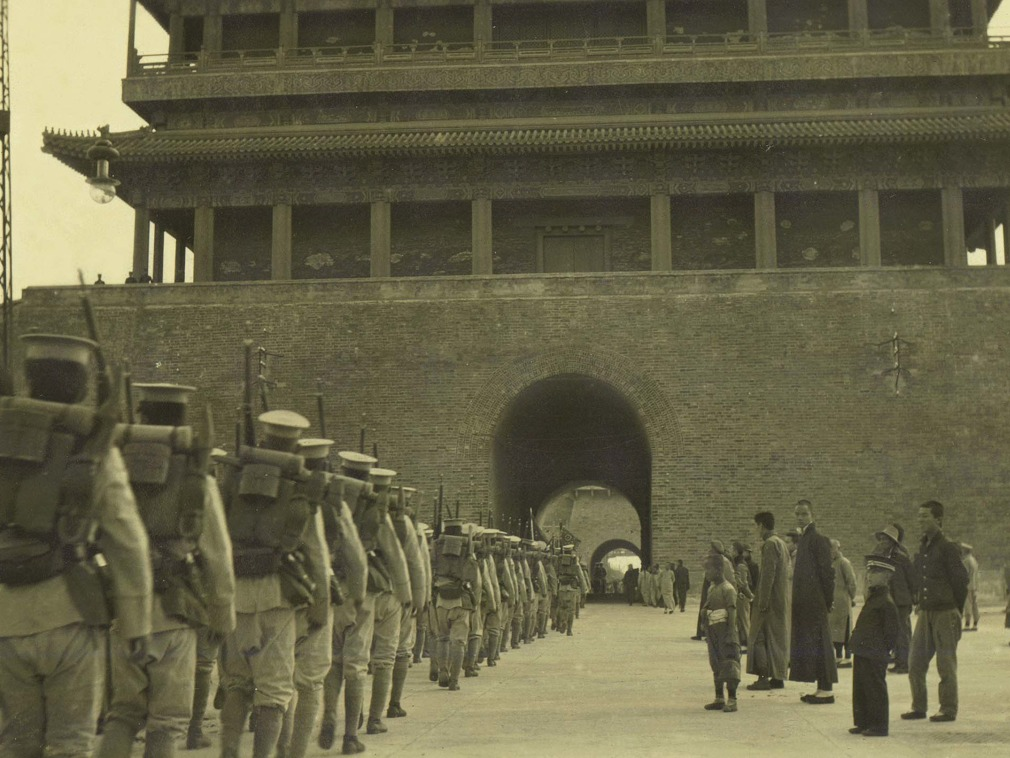
Beiyang soldiers entering Beijing's Zhengyangmen gate during the 1920s warlord conflicts

After the initial failure of the Hunan and Sichuan campaigns in late 1917, the Anhui and Zhili cliques engaged in backroom intrigue over who would control the presidency and the premiership in Beijing. Duan returned as premier in March 1918 and his allies in the Anfu Club dominated the newly reconvened parliament, though it fell apart into factional infighting. The other major disagreement between the Zhili and Anhui cliques was on national reunification, with Duan calling on Feng to invade the south using the Zhili clique forces in central China, while Feng, Cao Kun, and Wu Peifu saw this as an attempt by Duan to extend his power and wanted to negotiate with the south. Although Duan resigned again in October 1918, he still controlled the government in Beijing through his political allies. The Anhui clique also received the support of Zhang Zuolin's pro-Japanese Fengtian clique in Manchuria, in exchange for allowing Zhang to extend his power over the other two provinces of northeast China. Duan's continued building up of his army with Japanese help caused increasing hostility from the Zhili clique, especially after the Chinese public learned that Japan received Germany's former concession in Shandong at the Paris Peace Conference in large part because Duan effectively accepted this by signing secret agreements with Japan to receive their support in 1917–18. Cao Kun took over the leadership of the Zhili clique after Feng's death in 1919. When Duan decided to send troops into Mongolia, this also aggravated Zhang Zuolin, causing him and Cao to issue an ultimatum to Duan, which was rejected.

In response to Duan's rejection, Wu Peifu began moving troops north from Hunan, marking the start of the Zhili–Anhui War. At this point the Beiyang Army was fully split into two forces: the Anhui clique and the Zhili clique. The total number of soldiers between them and other factions in north China was estimated to be 536,000 in 1919. The Anhui clique was considered the strongest military force in China, and was also called the National Stabilization Army starting in 1920. It was initially organized in five divisions and four mixed brigades, consisting of an estimated 212,000 troops, and received supplies and training from the Japanese. The four brigades formed the Northwest Frontier Guard, which was used for the Chinese occupation of Mongolia in 1919.

The Zhili clique, initially consisting of Feng's 20,000 troops, later expanded, including with Cao Kun's Beiyang 3rd Division, in addition to several other units. By 1924 the Zhili clique army would include 250,000 soldiers. The 3rd Division, one of the original Beiyang divisions, was among the most elite of the warlord units and remained the power base of Cao Kun until his defeat in 1924. Feng Guozhang commanded the Imperial Guards Division of the former Qing, consisting of an even mix of Manchu Bannermen and Han soldiers, which the republican government had promised to maintain in its agreement with the imperial household. It became part of Feng's own power base along with the 15th Division, joining him in Nanjing in 1917 before returning to Beijing when Feng became president, now as his presidential guard. The guards were redesignated as the 16th Division of the "national" army and fought in several warlord conflicts before being disbanded in 1922. However, one regiment of the Manchu imperial guards stayed in Beijing and remained on duty at the Forbidden City as of 1924.

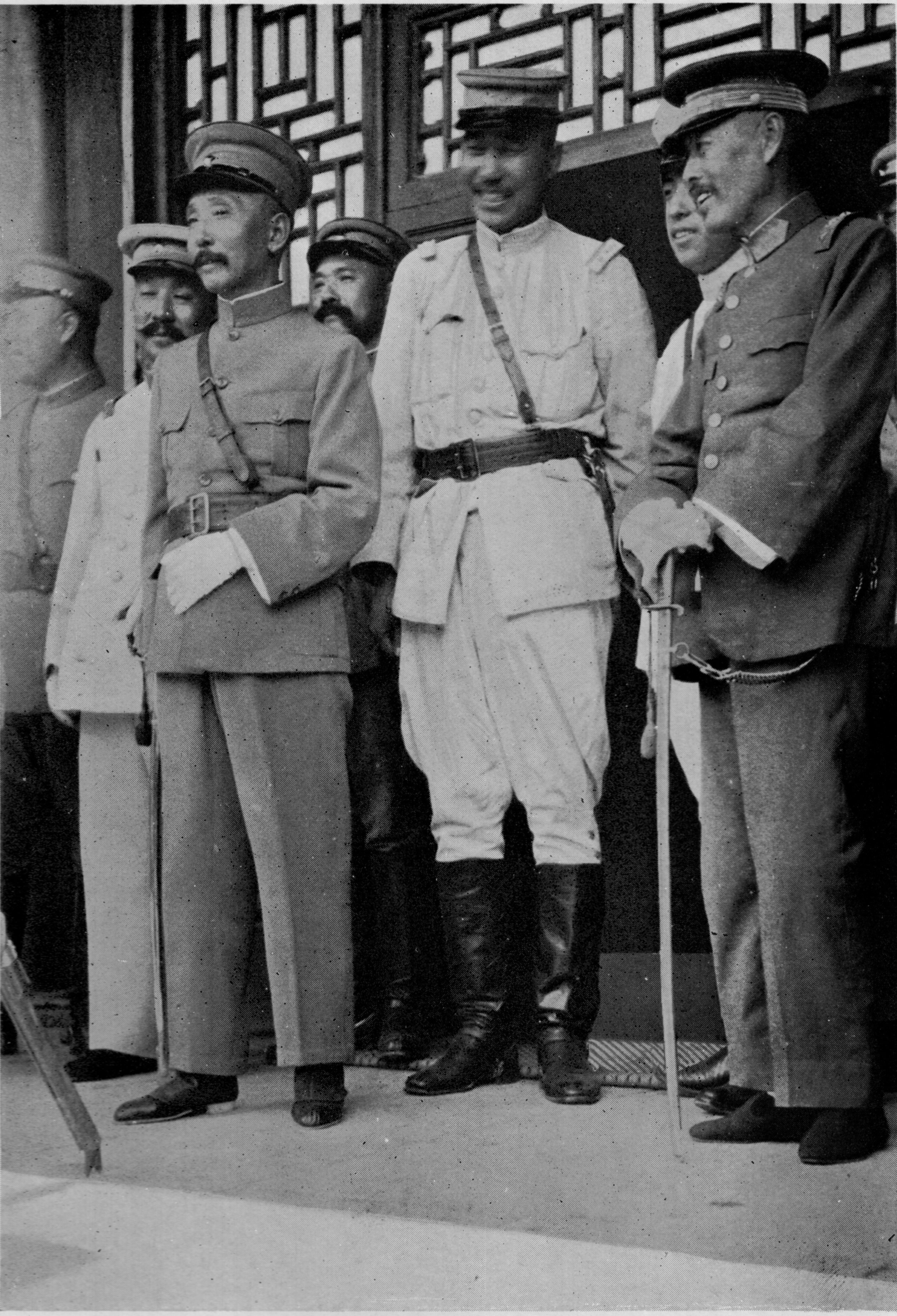
Meeting of Beiyang warlords. On the left, Zhang Zuolin, on the right Wu Peifu, in the middle, Zhang Zongchang, ruler of Shandong. Behind Wu, Zhang Zuolin's son Zhang Xueliang.

The Anhui–Zhili War lasted for five days in July 1920 and resulted in a decisive defeat for Duan's Japanese-backed forces. The Anhui clique, having controlled a vast territory in northern China and on the eastern coast, was reduced to only the southeastern provinces of Fujian and Zhejiang, while the Zhili clique was now in possession of most of northern and central China. The Fengtian clique also advanced into Inner Mongolia. Despite this, the Anfu Club still controlled the Beijing civilian government, with the Beiyang Army veteran Xu Shichang as president. Zhang Zuolin successfully had one of his allies installed as premier in late 1921, leading to tensions between him and the Zhili clique, which accused of him of treason. The First Zhili–Fengtian War occurred in the spring and summer of 1922 when Zhang moved his troops into Beijing, but they were defeated and forced to withdraw to Manchuria, leaving the Zhili clique as the dominant warlord faction in northern and central China. Cao Kun forced the resignation of President Xu and had Li Yuanhong installed as president in June 1922, but he was only in office until October 1923, when he was forced out and a bribed parliament elected Cao Kun as president.

Cao Kun's "election" ended what legitimacy the Beiyang government had left, and he was not recognized by the southern government, the Fengtian clique, or the Anhui clique holdouts. The three other factions formed an alliance against the Zhili clique, and Cao Kun's interests began diverging from one of his generals, Wu Peifu. His government was unpopular in the regions that it ruled. When the Zhili clique attempted to invade the remnants of the Anhui clique in September 1924, this triggered their alliances with Zhang Zuolin and Sun Yat-sen, beginning the Second Zhili–Fengtian War. The Zhili clique army, which had been expanded in 1920 and 1922 by absorbing some of the defeated Anhui and Fengtian forces, became involved in attritional warfare against the Anhui, but in October one of the Zhili generals betrayed the clique. Feng Yuxiang overthrew Cao Kun in a coup, having made a deal with Zhang Zuolin, and they replaced Cao with Duan Qirui as a figurehead. Duan remained in office until finally retiring in 1926. The Fengtian clique then expanded its territory into north and central China during 1925, though Sun Chuanfang of the Zhili clique maintained control in the Yangtze river valley, and the alliance between Zhang and Feng broke down in the fall of that year. In 1926 Zhang temporarily allied himself with Wu Peifu to fight Feng, but they eventually also turned on each other.

The constant infighting among the former Beiyang Army warlords in the north damaged their forces and distracted from developments in south China, where Sun Yat-sen's Kuomintang emerged as a significant force and formed its own National Revolutionary Army. The willingness of certain northern warlords, such as Feng Yuxiang, to ally themselves with the Kuomintang were critical to their decision in July 1926 to begin the Northern Expedition as a national reunification campaign out of their revolutionary base in the province of Guangdong.

== The Northern Expedition (1926–1928) ==
The National Revolutionary Army had been established as a Soviet-style party army in southern China in 1924 by the Kuomintang, with the support of Soviet military advisors, and by the spring of 1926 it was capable of fielding several divisions. After the death of Sun Yat-sen in March 1925 he was succeeded by Chiang Kai-shek as both the military and political leader of the KMT. He led the NRA against the warlord forces, taking over much of central China, including the economically prosperous Yangtze river valley, in early 1927. Among the former Beiyang Army warlords, Sun Chuanfang and Wu Peifu chose to fight against the Northern Expedition, while Feng Yuxiang allied himself with the Kuomintang. In response to the Nationalist advance in central China, Zhang Zuolin formed the National Pacification Army as an alliance of warlord forces in the north. Its main component was Zhang's Fengtian clique with 350,000 men, which was equipped with tanks and aircraft, and other forces included Sun Chuanfang's 200,000 men in central China and Zhang Zongchang's 150,000 in Shandong.

In the spring of 1928, Zhang Zuolin's forces were pushed back and forced to retreat into Manchuria. The National Revolutionary Army entered Beijing on 6 June 1928. The victory of the Kuomintang during the Northern Expedition represented the end of the Beiyang Army and the dominance of the warlords, with many of the warlord forces being absorbed into the National Revolutionary Army. However, some of the warlords remained in command of their forces by making an alliance with the Kuomintang, and they were nominally under the control of Chiang Kai-shek's Nationalist government. This situation persisted right up until the Chinese Communist takeover in 1949.

Fengtian clique and National Pacification Army equipment
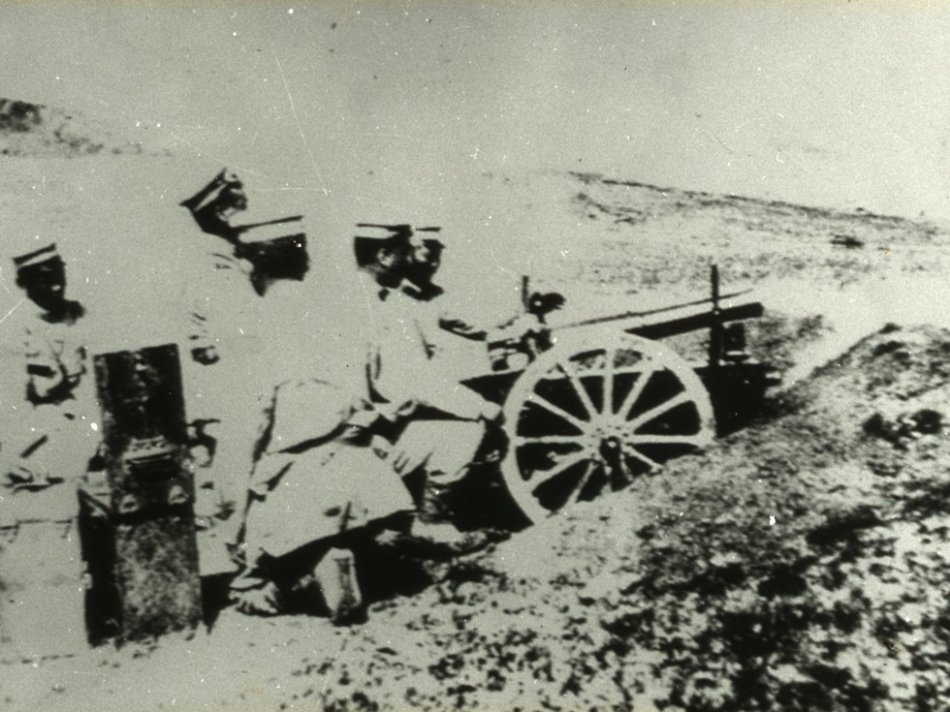
Mountain gun

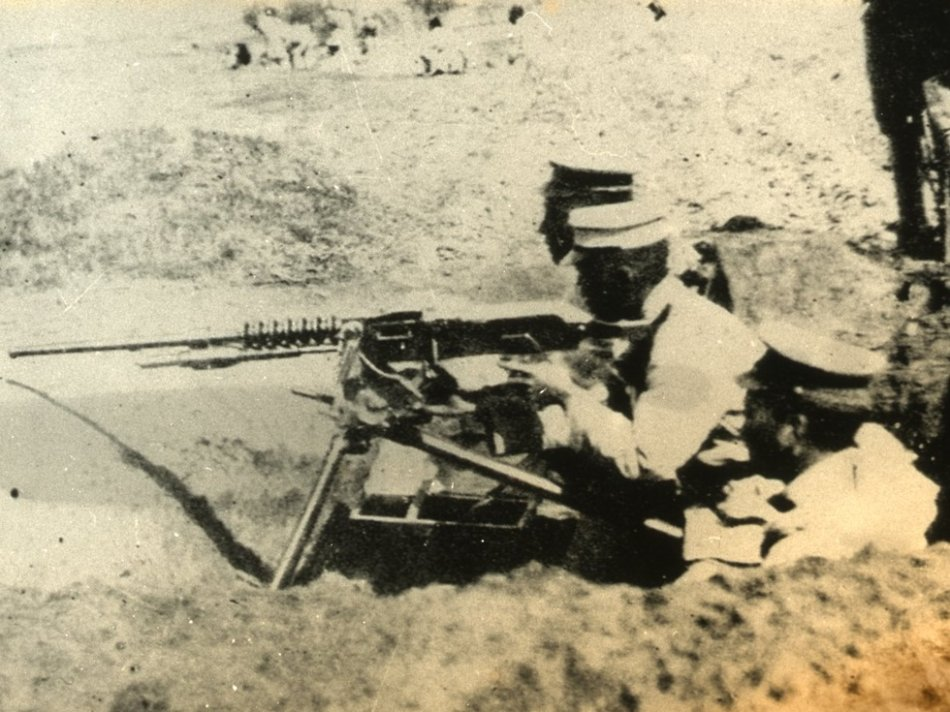
Hotchkiss Heavy machine gun

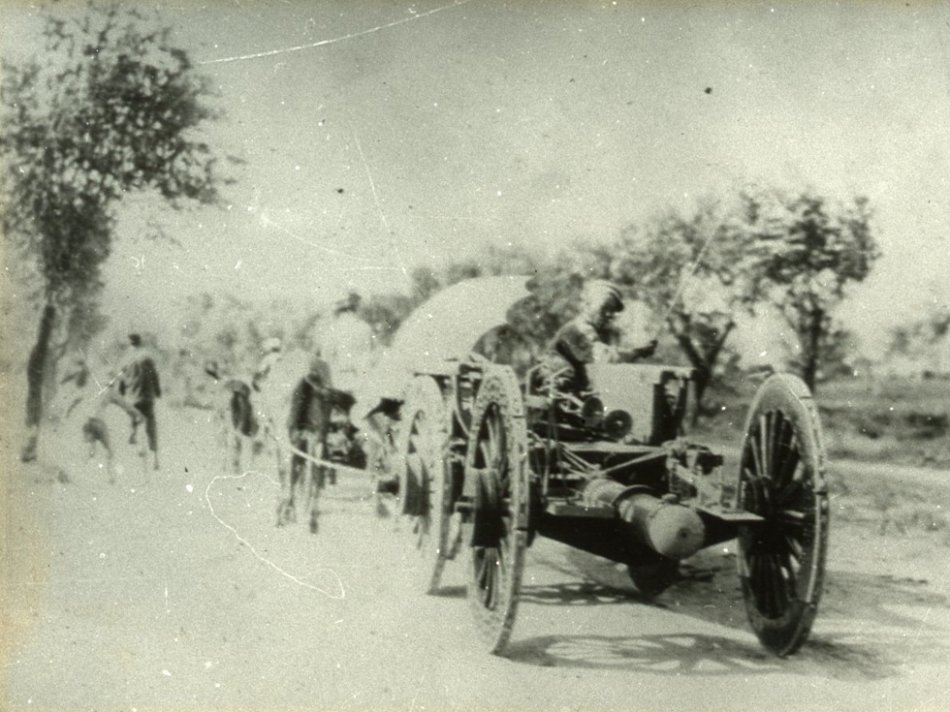
Howitzer

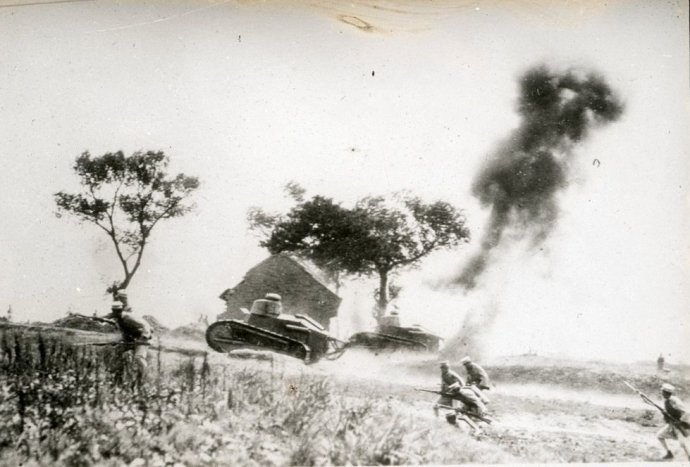
Renault FT-17 tanks

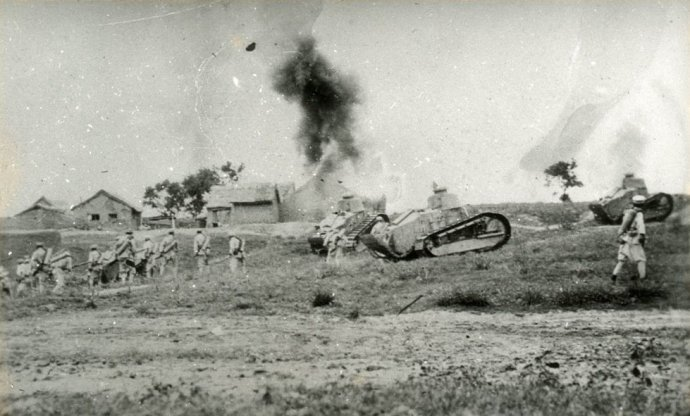
Renault FT tanks

== Ranks and insignia ==
=== Officers ===
The officers for the Beiyang Army were drawn from the literate and educated class. In the early 1900s an increasing number of officers were from the military schools that Yuan Shikai had established, such as the Baoding Military Academy, though about half of them were from military schools in other parts of China or had been trained in Japan. In later decades the Baoding Military Academy produced the majority of the Beiyang Army officer corps.

| Rank group | General / flag officers | | | Senior officers | | | Junior officers |
|---|---|---|---|---|---|---|---|---|---|---|
| 1911–1912 |
| 1911–1912 | 上等第一级; Shàngděng dì yījí | 上等第二级; Shàngděng dì èrjí | 上等第三级; Shàngděng dì sānjí | 中等第一级; Zhōngděng dì yījí | 中等第二级; Zhōngděng dì èrjí | 中等第三级; Zhōngděng dì sānjí | 次等第一级; Cìděng dì yījí | 次等第二级; Cìděng dì èrjí | 次等第三级; Cìděng dì sānjí |
| 1912–1928 |
| 1912–1928 | 一等一级; Yīděng yījí | 一等二级; Yīděng èrjí | 一等三级; Yīděng sānjí | 二等一级; Èrděng yījí | 二等二级; Èrděng èrjí | 二等三级; Èrděng sānjí | 三等一级; Sānděng yījí | 三等二级; Sānděng èrjí | 三等三级; Sānděng sānjí | 等外军官; Děng wài jūnguān |

=== Enlisted soldiers ===
During the Qing dynasty, the Beiyang Army recruits were mostly from the peasant class, and although there was no official government conscription some of them had been drafted.

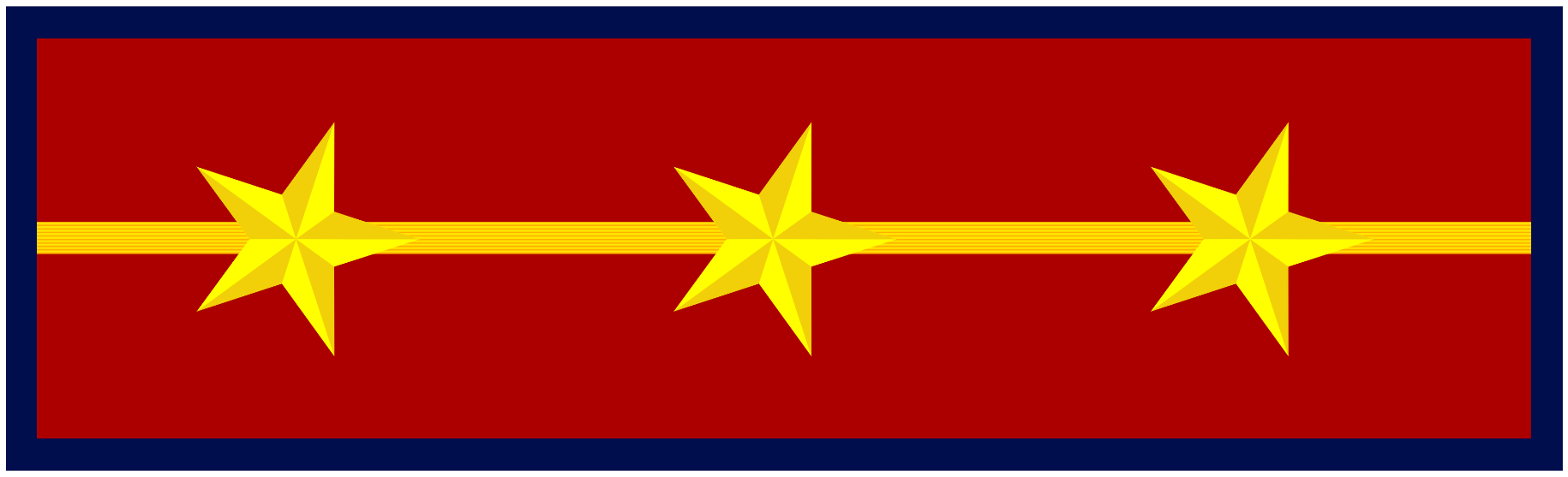
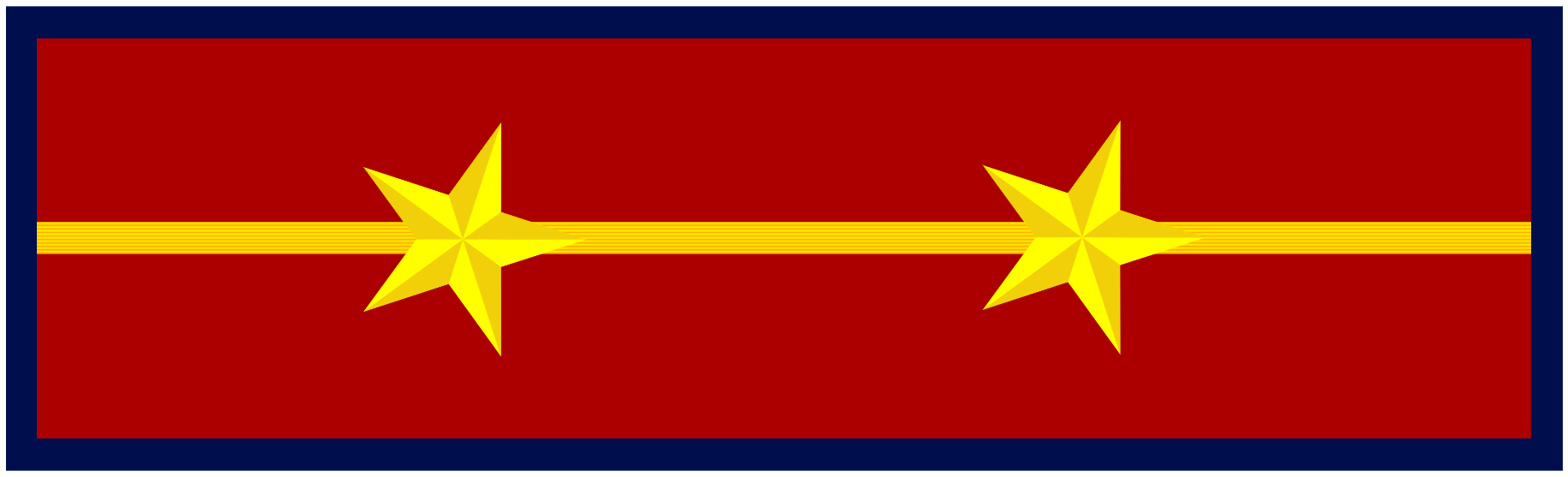
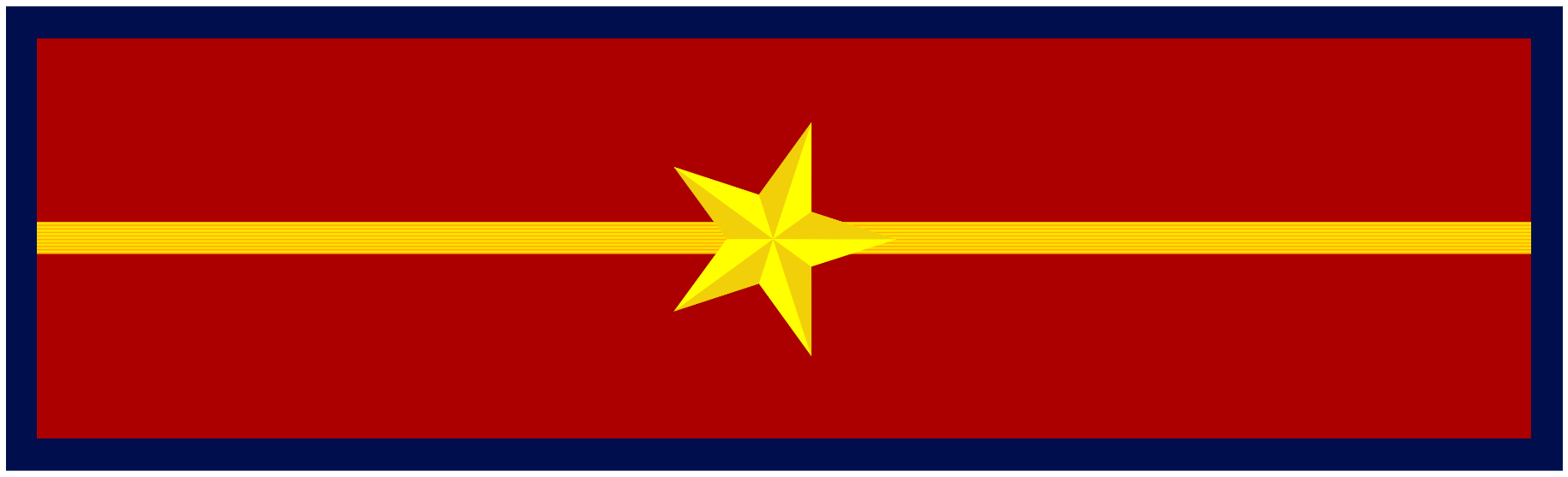
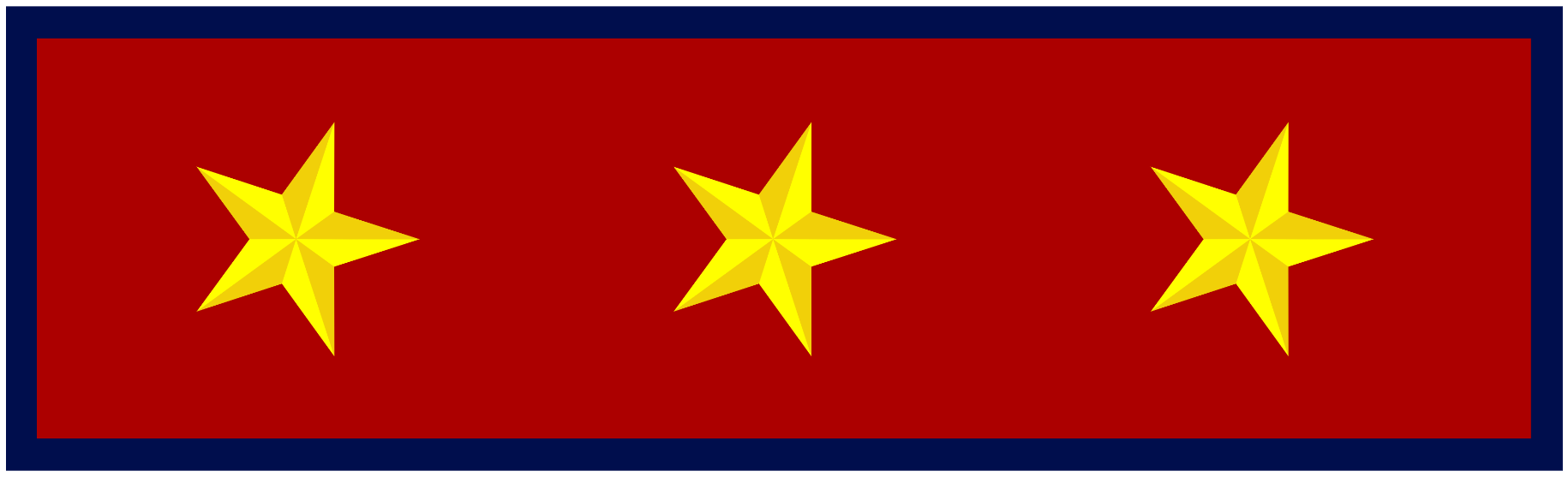
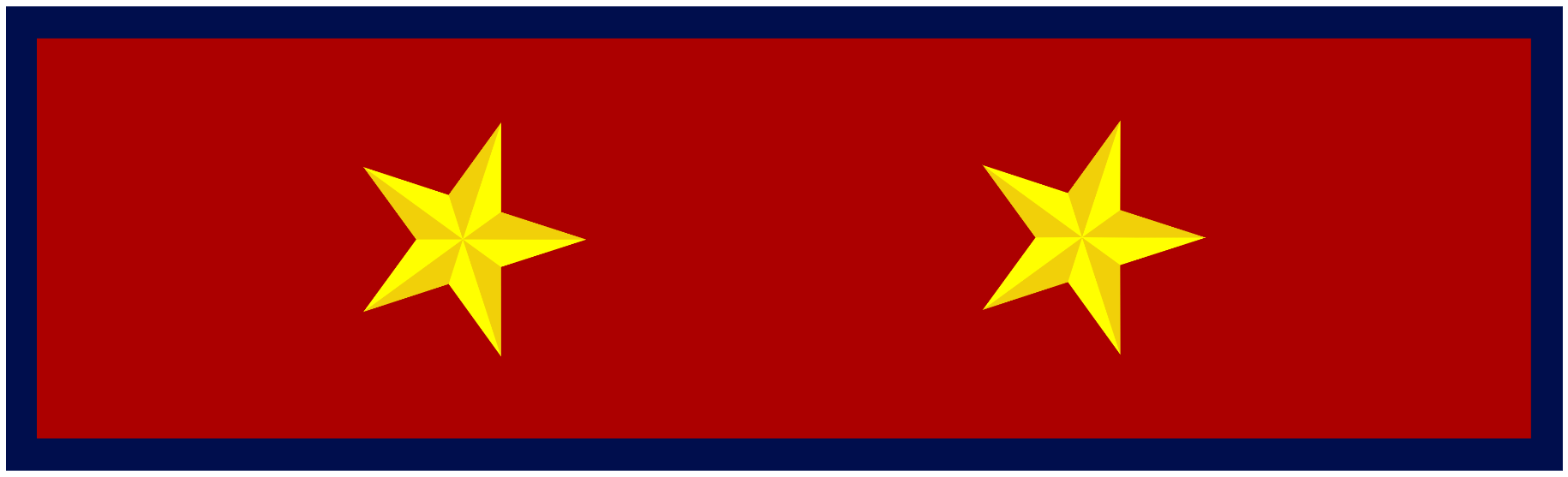
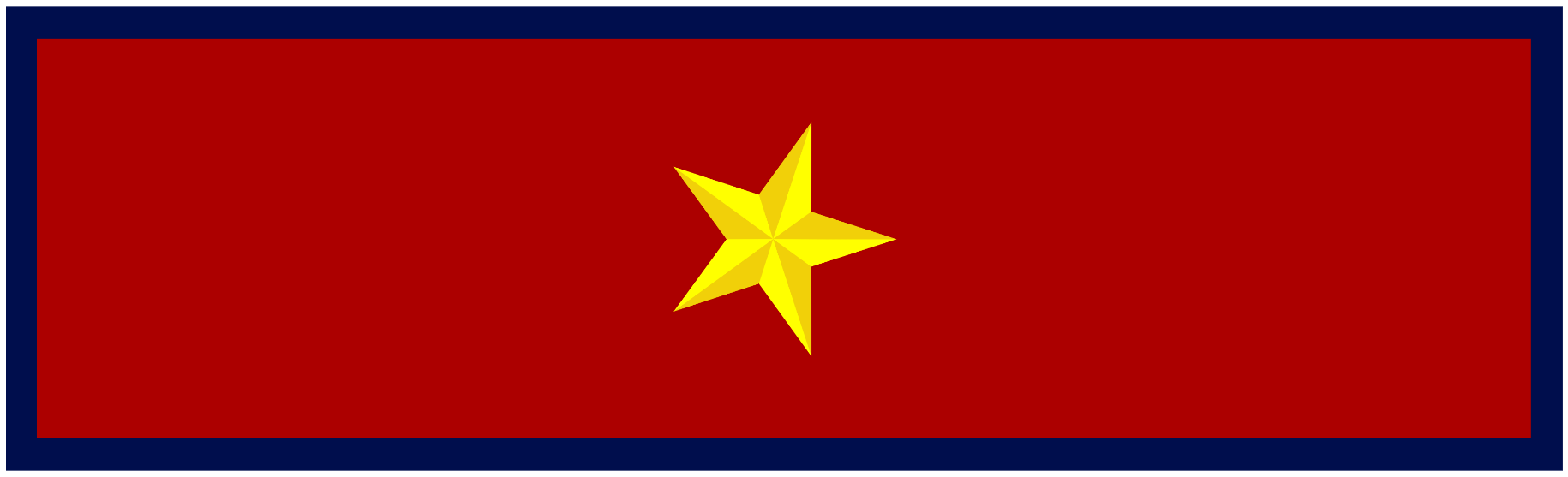
| Rank group | Senior NCOs | | | Junior NCOs | Enlisted |
|---|---|---|---|---|---|---|
| 1911–1912 |
| 1911–1912 | 上士; Shàngshì | 中士; Zhōngshì | 下士; Xiàshì | 正兵; Zhèngbīng | 一等兵; Yīděngbīng | 二等兵; Èrděngbīng |
| 1912–1928 |
| 1912–1928 | 上士; Shàngshì | 中士; Zhōngshì | 下士; Xiàshì | 上等兵; Shàngděngbīng | 一等兵; Yīděngbīng | 二等兵; Èrděngbīng |

== Symbols ==
Flag of China from 1912 to 1928

Flag used by the Chinese army until 1928

Badge of the Beiyang Army

Roundel of the Beiyang Air Force

== Sources ==
- Boorman, Howard L.; Howard, Richard C., eds. (1968). Biographical Dictionary of Republican China. Vol. II. New York: Columbia University Press. ISBN 0-231-08957-0.
- Boorman, Howard L.; Howard, Richard C., eds. (1971). Biographical Dictionary of Republican China. Vol. IV. New York: Columbia University Press. ISBN 0-231-08957-0.
- Ch'en, Jerome (1960). "A Footnote on the Chinese Army in 1911–12". T'oung Pao. 48 (4/5): 425–446. JSTOR 4527485.
- Ch'en, Jerome (1968). "Defining Chinese Warlords and Their Factions". Bulletin of the School of Oriental and African Studies, University of London. 31 (3): 563–600. doi:10.1017/S0041977X00125571. JSTOR 614306.
- Elleman, Bruce A. (2001). Modern Chinese Warfare, 1795–1989. Routledge. ISBN 978-0-415-21474-2.
- Elleman, Bruce A.; Paine, S.C.M. (2019). Modern China: Continuity and Change, 1644 to the Present. Rowman & Littlefield. ISBN 978-1-5381-0387-6.
- Fung, Allen (1996). "Testing the Self-Strengthening: The Chinese Army in the Sino-Japanese War of 1894–1895". Modern Asian Studies. 40 (3): 1007–1031. doi:10.1017/S0026749X00016875.
- Huateng, Zhang (2014). "The Qing's three armies after the Wuchang Uprising". In Joseph Esherick and C.X. George Wei (ed.). China: How the Empire Fell. Routledge. ISBN 978-0-415-83101-7.
- Jowett, Philip (2013). China's Wars: Rousing the Dragon 1894–1949. Bloomsbury Publishing. ISBN 978-1-47280-673-4.
- Mackinnon, Stephen R. (1973). "The Peiyang Army, Yuan Shih-K'ai, and the Origins of Modern Chinese Warlordism". The Journal of Asian Studies. 32 (3): 405–23. doi:10.2307/2052681. JSTOR 2052681.
- McCord, Edward A. (1993). The Power of the Gun: The Emergence of Modern Chinese Warlordism. Berkeley: University of California Press. ISBN 978-0-520-08128-4.
- McCord, Edward A. (2012). "Warlordism in Early Republican China". In Graff, David A.; Higham, Robert (eds.). A Military History of China. University Press of Kentucky. ISBN 978-0-8131-3584-7.
- McCord, Edward A. (2021). "Public Opinion and Warlord Power: The Issue of Troop Demobilization in Early Republican China". American Journal of Chinese Studies. 28 (2): 97–114. JSTOR 45416313.
- Nathan, Andrew J. (1976). Peking Politics, 1918–1923. Berkeley and Los Angeles: University of California Press. ISBN 0-520-02784-1.
- Philips, Richard T. (1996). China Since 1911. Bloomsbury Publishing. ISBN 978-0-312-12941-5.
- Paine, S.C.M. (2003). The Sino-Japanese War of 1894–1895: Perceptions, Power, and Primacy. Cambridge University Press. ISBN 978-0-521-81714-1.
- Ping, Xu, ed. (2009). Zhōngguó bǎinián jūnfú (zēngbǔ bǎn) 中国百年军服 (增补版) [China Regimental 100 Years] (2nd ed.). Gold Wall Press. ISBN 978-7-80084-679-3.
- Powell, Ralph L. (1955). The Rise of Chinese Military Power 1895–1912. Princeton: Princeton University Press. ISBN 978-0-8046-1645-4.
- Rhoads, Edward J. M. (2000). Manchus and Han: Ethnic Relations and Political Power in Late Qing and Early Republican China, 1861–1928. Seattle: University of Washington Press. ISBN 978-0-295-99748-3.
- Setzekorn, Eric (2018). The Rise and Fall of an Officer Corps: The Republic of China Military, 1942–1955. Norman: University of Oklahoma Press. ISBN 978-0-8061-6296-6.
- Ven, Hans van de (2003). War and Nationalism in China: 1925–1945. London and New York: Routledge. ISBN 0-415-14571-6.
- Wang, Jianhua (Spring–Summer 1995). "Military Reforms, 1895-1908". Chinese Studies in History. 28 (3–4): 67–84. doi:10.2753/CSH0009-463328030467.
