= Cabinet of Yuan Shikai =

- 2nd Cabinet of China

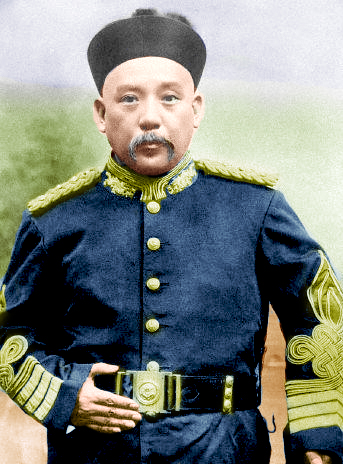
- Date formed: 16 November 1911
- Date dissolved: 12 February 1912

People and organisations
- Head of state: Xuantong Emperor
- Head of government: Yuan Shikai
- No. of ministers: 13

History
- Election: Appointed by the Emperor
- Predecessor: Prince Qing's Cabinet
- Successor: Nanking Provisional Government cabinet /Government of Zhang Xun (Imperial Restoration, 1917)

The Yuan Shikai Cabinet was the second cabinet of the Qing dynasty and of China, led by Yuan Shikai as Prime Minister from 2 November 1911 to the abdication of the Xuantong Emperor in February 1912.

== History ==
In 1911, the Wuchang Uprising broke out, and Prince Qing stepped down from his position as Prime Minister. General Yuan Shikai was summoned back to put down the rebellion and was also appointed Prime Minister. His cabinet was set up on 16 November 1911.

== Composition ==
The following is a list of ministers in the cabinet:

Portfolio	Minister
Prime Minister	Yuan Shikai 袁世凱
Minister of Foreign Affairs	Liang Dunyan 梁敦彥
Vice Minister of Foreign Affairs	Hu Weide 胡惟德
Minister of the Interior	Zhao Bingjun 趙秉鈞
Vice Minister of the Interior	Wuzhen 烏珍
Minister of Finance	Yan Xiu 嚴修
Vice Minister of Finance	Chen Jintao 陳錦濤
Vice Minister of Finance	Zhou Ziqi 周自齊
Minister of Education	Tang Jingchong 唐景崇
Vice Minister of Education	Yang Du 楊度
Vice Minister of Education	Liu Tingchen 劉廷琛
Vice Minister of Education	Zhang Yuanji 張元濟
Minister of the Army	Wang Shizhen 王士珍
Vice Minister of the Army	Tian Wenlie 田文烈
Minister of the Navy	Sa Zhenbing 薩鎮冰
Minister of Justice	Shen Jiaben 沈家本
Vice Minister of Justice	Liang Qichao 梁啟超
Vice Minister of Justice	Zeng Jian 曾鑑
Minister of Agriculture, Industry, and Commerce	Zhang Jian 張謇
Vice Minister of Agriculture, Industry, and Commerce	Xiyan 熙彥
Minister of Communications	Yang Shiqi 楊士琦
Vice Minister of Communications	Liang Juhao 梁如浩
Minister of the Lifan Yuan	Dashou 達壽
Vice Minister of the Lifan Yuan	Rongxun 榮勳
