= Imperial Edict of the Abdication of the Qing Emperor =

Decree ending imperial rule in China

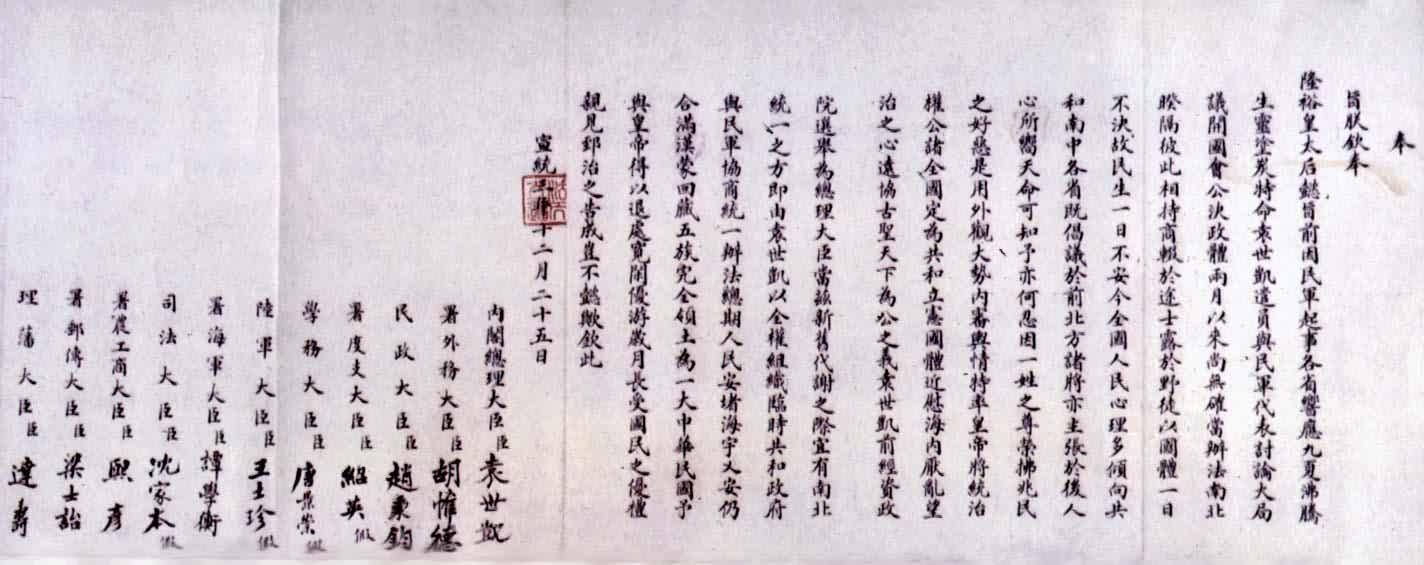
- Created: 12 February 1912
- Author: Empress Dowager Longyu (on behalf of the Xuantong Emperor)

The Imperial Edict of the Abdication of the Qing Emperor (traditional Chinese: 宣統帝退位詔書; simplified Chinese: 宣统帝退位诏书; pinyin: Xuāntǒng Dì Tuìwèi Zhàoshū; lit. "Xuantong Emperor's Abdication Edict") was an official decree issued by the Empress Dowager Longyu on behalf of the six-year-old Xuantong Emperor, the last emperor of the Qing dynasty of China, on 12 February 1912, as a response to the Xinhai Revolution. The revolution led to the self-declared independence of 13 southern Chinese provinces and the subsequent peace negotiation between the rest of Qing China and the collective of the southern provinces.

The issuance of the Imperial Edict marked the end of the over 200-year rule of the Qing dynasty, (Note: The Qing dynasty lasted 276 years, if counted from the inauguration of the dynastic name "Great Qing" in 1636 by Hong Taiji. If its predecessor, the Later Jin, is taken into account, the regime lasted 296 years. If the duration is counted from 1644 when the Qing dynasty replaced the Ming dynasty as the orthodox dynasty of China, it lasted 268 years.) and the era of Chinese imperial rule, which lasted 2,132 years. Furthermore, the Imperial Edict established the First Republic of China as the immediate successor state to the Qing dynasty and provided the legal basis for the Republic of China to inherit all Qing territories, including China proper, Manchuria, Mongolia, Xinjiang, and Tibet.

== Background ==
The Qing dynasty was proclaimed by the Manchus in 1636. In Chinese historiography, the Qing dynasty bore the Mandate of Heaven after it succeeded the Ming dynasty in 1644. In the late 19th century, wars with foreign powers led to the loss of territories and tributary states, such as Hong Kong in the First Opium War and Korea in the First Sino-Japanese War. These developments eroded confidence in the Qing government and contributed to the growth of Han ethnonationalism among some revolutionaries, who opposed Qing rule, advocated the restoration of Han political rule, and rejected the Qing conception of a broader, multiethnic Chinese nation. This sentiment was further strengthened by dissatisfaction with political reform. The establishment of the Prince Qing’s Cabinet in May 1911, in which a majority of ministers were members of the imperial clan, undermined confidence in the Qing government’s commitment to constitutional reform.

.

The revolutionaries aided by millions of overseas Chinese calling for a government reform continued to launch anti-Qing military campaigns in southern China, yet these campaigns were soon suppressed by the government. In October 1911, however, the uprising in Wuchang in central China caused nationwide echos, where 13 out of 18 Han-majority Chinese provinces declared independence from the empire and later established a republican government led by the revolutionary leader Sun Yat-sen. In response to the call for constitutional democracy, the Imperial Government appointed Yuan Shikai as the prime minister, yet Yuan continued to negotiate with the revolutionaries who later offered to make Yuan the first president of the Republic of China and to provide preferential treatment for the imperial family. To confront the internal pressure, Yuan ordered 50 of generals and senior officials in Beiyang Army, led by General Duan Qirui, to publish telegraphes calling for peace and threatening the imperial family. The Empress Dowager Longyu, on behalf of the Xuantong Emperor, issued the imperial edict which transferred power to the nascent Republic of China and two sequent edicts.

== Drafting ==
The true author of the edict is debated, but it is believed that Zhang Jian drafted the edict. However, a report on Shen-Pao, a leading Shanghai newspaper then, on 22 February 1912, titled the sad words by the empress when issuing the edict of the abdication, says that the edict was first drafted by Zhang Yuanqi, the Deputy Minister of Education, amended by Xu Shichang, shown to the Empress by Yuan Shikai on 25 January 1912. After reading the edict, the Empress was said to cry with tears streaming down, and added her own personal seal instead of the imperial seal to the edict. The personal seal of the Empress shows the four Chinese characters meaning the great way of the nature and the heaven (Chinese: 法天大道), which suggested her scorn towards the new republic.

== Content of the edict ==
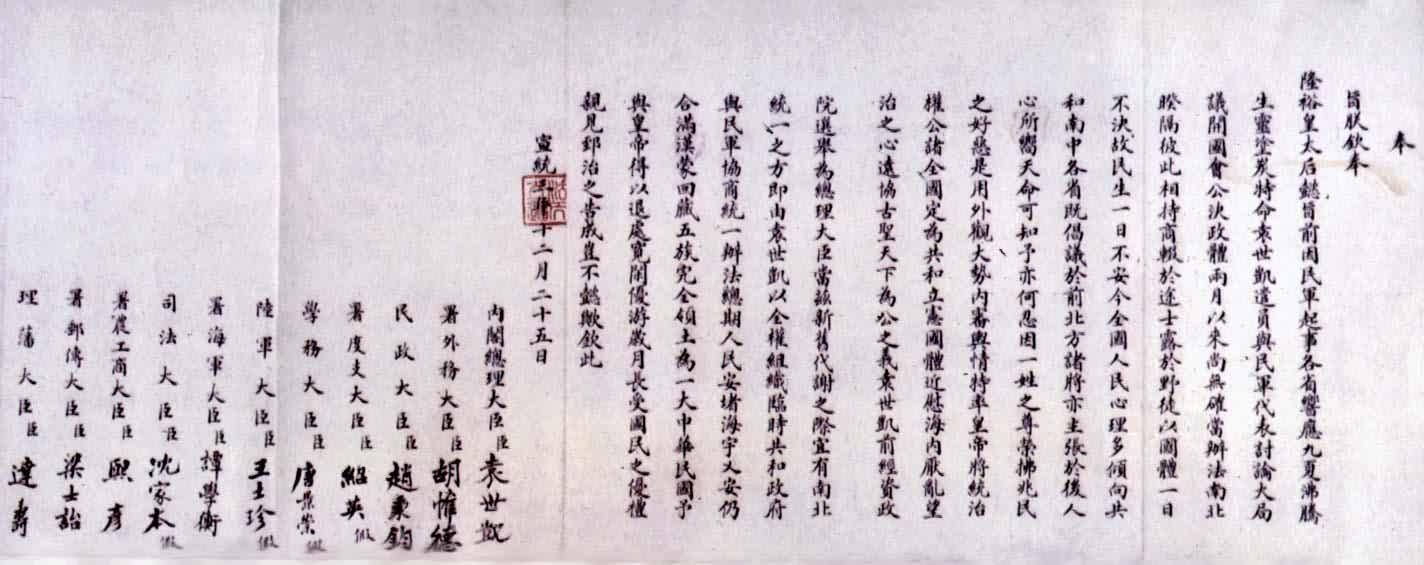
Imperial Edict of the Abdication of the Qing Emperor

The full texts of the Imperial Edict of the Abdication of the Qing Emperor, in English translation and the Classical Chinese original, are as follows:

By Imperial Decree:

I am in receipt of an Edict from the Empress Dowager Longyu: Complementing an earlier uprising of the people's army, all provinces have risen in allegiance, Jiuzhou–Huaxia has been plunged into disorder, and the populace has been afflicted with great misery. Yuan Shikai was specially ordered to appoint Commissioners to receive those agents and representatives of the people's army, in order to commence a national assembly on the state of the nation and the governance thereof. Two months have since elapsed, without a settlement concluded nor progress noted. Great distances lie between the South and the North, each upholding its own against the other. Merchants' travels are disrupted and scholars are exposed, as should the Government be undetermined, the livelihoods of the populace ought soon follow. Now, the majority of the people are leaning towards republicanism; provinces in the South and the Central took the pioneering step in advocating for it, then the officers in the North also desired to follow their example. In the universal desire of the heart of the people may be discernible the will of Heaven. How dare we then, for the honor and glory of but one surname, persist in opposing the desire of millions of common-folk? In conscience, the general position abroad must be examined and popular opinion domestically ought be considered. I, together with the Emperor, henceforth and hereby transfer the ruling power to the common citizenry, and do ordain that the form of Government herein shall be one of constitutional republicanism. This is to satisfy the demands of those within the Four Seas who detest disturbances and yearn for peace, and to follow the example of the ancient sages in regarding all under Heaven as common territory.

Yuan Shikai, having been formerly elected Prime Minister by the Advisory Council, now standing at this juncture marking the transition to the new Government from the old, has himself devised a plan for unifying the South with the North. May Yuan Shikai organize with full powers a provisional republican Government and confer with the people's army as to the methods of procedure for the Union, such that peace may be assured and restored to the people and country, all while retaining the complete territorial integrity of the lands of the five races—Manchu, Han, Mongol, Hui, and Tibetan—which shall combine to form a great Republic of China. I, together with the Emperor, may retire into a leisured life and spend our years pleasantly, enjoying the courteous treatment from the citizens, and witnessing with our own eyes the realization of great governance. Would this not be a grand feat? End of Decree.

奉旨

朕欽奉隆裕皇太后懿旨：前因民軍起事，各省響應，九夏沸騰，生靈塗炭。特命袁世凱遣員與民軍代表討論大局，議開國會、公決政體。兩月以來，尚無確當辦法。南北暌隔，彼此相持。商輟於途，士露於野。徒以國體一日不決，故民生一日不安。今全國人民心理多傾向共和。南中各省，既倡議於前，北方諸將，亦主張於後。人心所嚮，天命可知。予亦何忍因一姓之尊榮，拂兆民之好惡。是用外觀大勢，內審輿情，特率皇帝將統治權公諸全國，定為共和立憲國體。近慰海內厭亂望治之心，遠協古聖天下為公之義。

袁世凱前經資政院選舉為總理大臣，當茲新舊代謝之際，宜有南北統一之方。即由袁世凱以全權組織臨時共和政府，與民軍協商統一辦法。總期人民安堵，海宇乂安，仍合滿、漢、蒙、回、藏五族完全領土為一大中華民國。予與皇帝得以退處寬閑，優游歲月，長受國民之優禮，親見郅治之告成，豈不懿歟！欽此。

Endorsed by the Empress Dowager Longyu on behalf of the six-year-old Xuantong Emperor, the edict explicitly transferred sovereignty over all the territories held by the Qing dynasty at the time of its collapse—including China proper, Manchuria, Tibet, Xinjiang, and Mongolia—to the Republic of China.

Signatories to the edict were:

- Prime Minister of the Imperial Cabinet Yuan Shikai (袁世凱);
- Acting Minister of Foreign Affairs Hu Weide (胡惟德);
- Minister of Interior Affairs Zhao Bingjun (趙秉鈞);
- Acting Minister of Finance Magiya Shaoying (馬佳·紹英);
- Minister of Education Tang Jingchong (唐景崇);
- Minister of the Army Wang Shizhen (王士珍);
- Acting Minister of the Navy Tan Xueheng (譚學衡);
- Minister of Justice Shen Jiaben (沈家本);
- Acting Minister of Agriculture, Works and Commerce Hitara Xiyan (喜塔臘·熙彥);
- Acting Minister of Posts and Communications Liang Shiyi (梁士詒);
- Minister of Feudatory Regions Affairs Dashou (達壽).

== Aftermath ==
The Articles of Favourable Treatment of the Great Qing Emperor after His Abdication allowed the Xuantong Emperor to retain his imperial title and enjoy other privileges following his abdication, resulting in the existence of a nominal court in the Forbidden City called the "Remnant Court of the Abdicated Qing Imperial Family" (遜清皇室小朝廷) from 1912 to 1924. Feng Yuxiang revoked the privileges and abolished the titular court in 1924.

== Legacy ==
The edict was first collected by Zhang Chaoyong, the secretary of the cabinet, who saved it with two sequent imperial edict regarding the abdication and the 3 February edict authorising peace negotiation with the revolutionists in a single scroll. After Zhang died, the president of Beijing Normal University bought the scroll. Since 1975, the scroll has been part of the collection of the Museum of the Chinese Revolution, now known as the National Museum of China.

== Related edicts ==
The Xuantong Emperor issued three edicts of abdication throughout his life. The first two were issued in his capacity as Qing emperor, including that described in this article and another issued following the failure of the Manchu Restoration. The third one was issued after the Soviet invasion of Manchuria, in his capacity as Emperor of Manchukuo, a Japanese puppet state during World War II.

== See also ==
- 1911 Revolution
- 1911 Revolution in Xinjiang
- Xinhai Lhasa turmoil
- Mongolian Revolution of 1911
- Abolition of monarchy
