= Liang Dunyan =

Qing Chinese diplomat and politician

- 梁敦彦
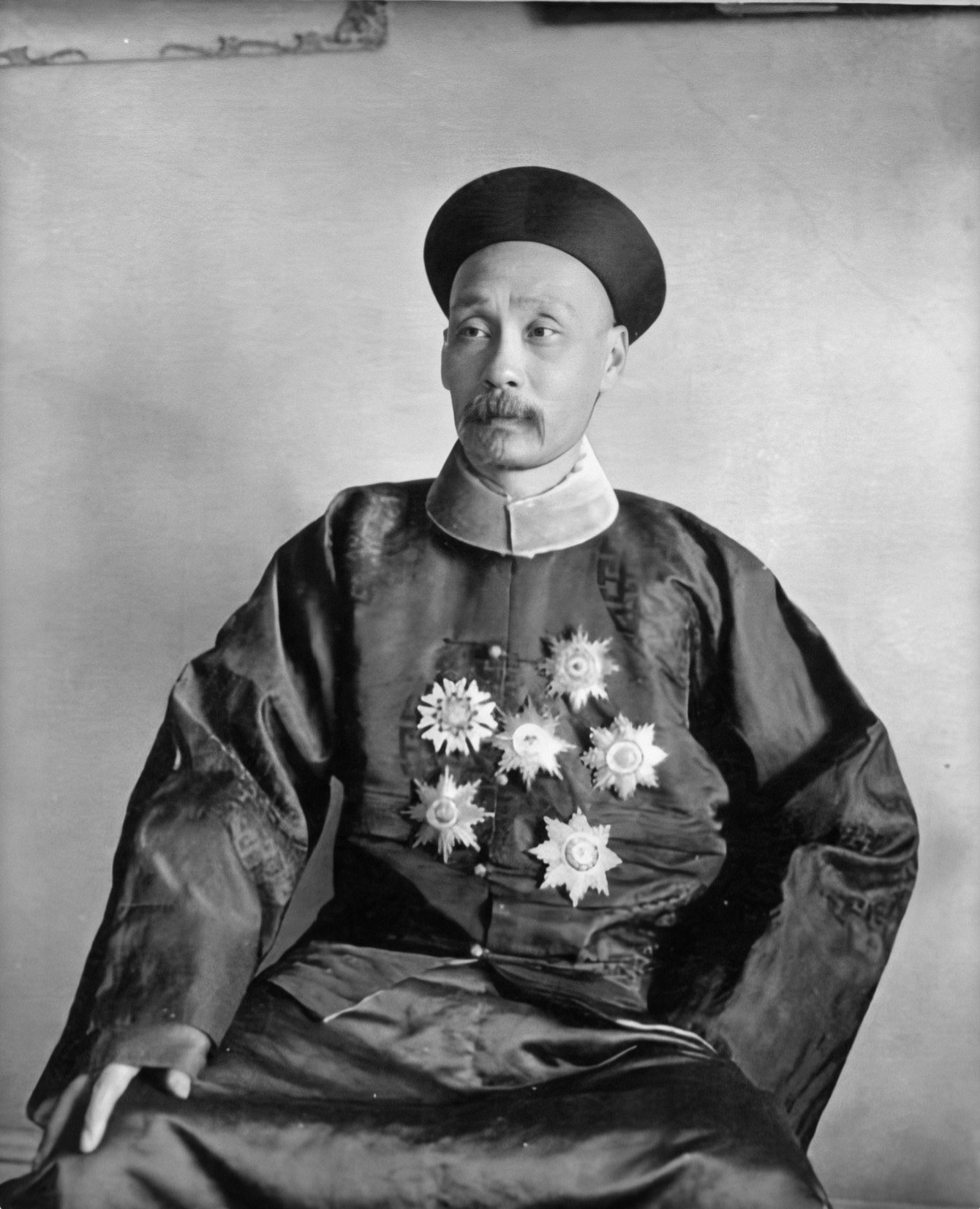

Secretary of Foreign Affairs
- In office 1 July 1917 – 12 July 1917
- Monarch: Xuantong Emperor
- Prime Minister: Zhang Xun
- Preceded by: Position established
- Succeeded by: Position abolished

Minister of Transport
- In office May 1914 – April 1916
- President: Yuan Shikai
- Preceded by: Zhu Qiqian
- Succeeded by: Cao Rulin

1st Minister of Foreign Affairs of the Imperial Cabinet
- In office 8 May 1911 – 1 November 1911
- Monarch: Xuantong Emperor
- Prime Minister: Yikuang, Prince Qing
- Preceded by: Position esetablished Himself (as Secretary of Foreign Affairs)
- Succeeded by: Position abolished

Secretary of Foreign Affairs
- In office 1908-1910
- Monarch: Xuantong Emperor
- Preceded by: Yuan Shikai
- Succeeded by: Himself (as Minister of Foreign Affairs)

Personal details
- Born: 1857 Foshan, Guangdong, Qing Empire
- Died: 10 May 1924 (aged 66–67) Tianjin, Republic of China
- Children: 3
- Education: Yale University
- Awards: Order of the Double Dragon; Order of the Sacred Treasure
Liang Dunyan
- Chinese: 梁敦彦
Transcriptions
Standard Mandarin
- Hanyu Pinyin: Liáng Dūnyàn
- Wade–Giles: Liang^{2} Tun^{1}-yen^{4}
Yue: Cantonese
- Jyutping: Loeng^{4} Deon^{1}-jin^{6}

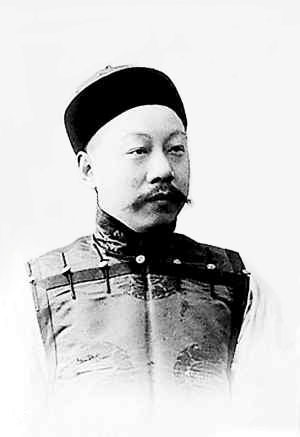
Liang Dunyan

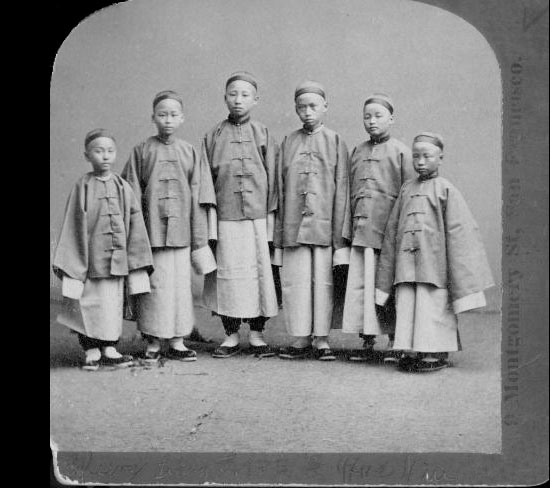
Liang Dunyan (the second one from the left) as a child in San Francisco with other young children, September 1872

Liang Dunyan (Chinese: 梁敦彦; Wade–Giles: Liang Tun-yen; 1857 - 1924) was a Qing dynasty diplomat and politician. A graduate of Yale University, he served as the minister of foreign affairs in the first cabinet of China under Yikuang (Prince Qing) and later in the cabinet of Yuan Shikai. A monarchist, he supported the Manchu Restoration of July 1917 and was the foreign minister under Zhang Xun.

== Bibliography ==
- 徐友春主編 (2007). 民国人物大辞典 増訂版|和書. 河北人民出版社. ISBN 978-7-202-03014-1.
- 劉寿林ほか編 (1995). 民国職官年表|和書. Zhonghua Book Company. ISBN 7-101-01320-1.

| Preceded by Yuan Shikai | Qing Secretary of Foreign Affairs; 1908–1910 | Succeeded by Himself as minister |
| Preceded by Himself as secretary | Qing Minister of Foreign Affairs; 1911–1912 | Succeeded by office abolished |
| Preceded by Zhu Qiqian | Minister of Transport; May 1914 – April 1916 | Succeeded by Cao Rulin |
| Preceded by office created | Qing dynasty secretary of foreign affairs July 1917 | Succeeded by office abolished |
