= Nanking Provisional Government cabinet =

- 1st Cabinet of the Provisional Government of the Republic of China
- 3 January 1912 – 1 April 1912
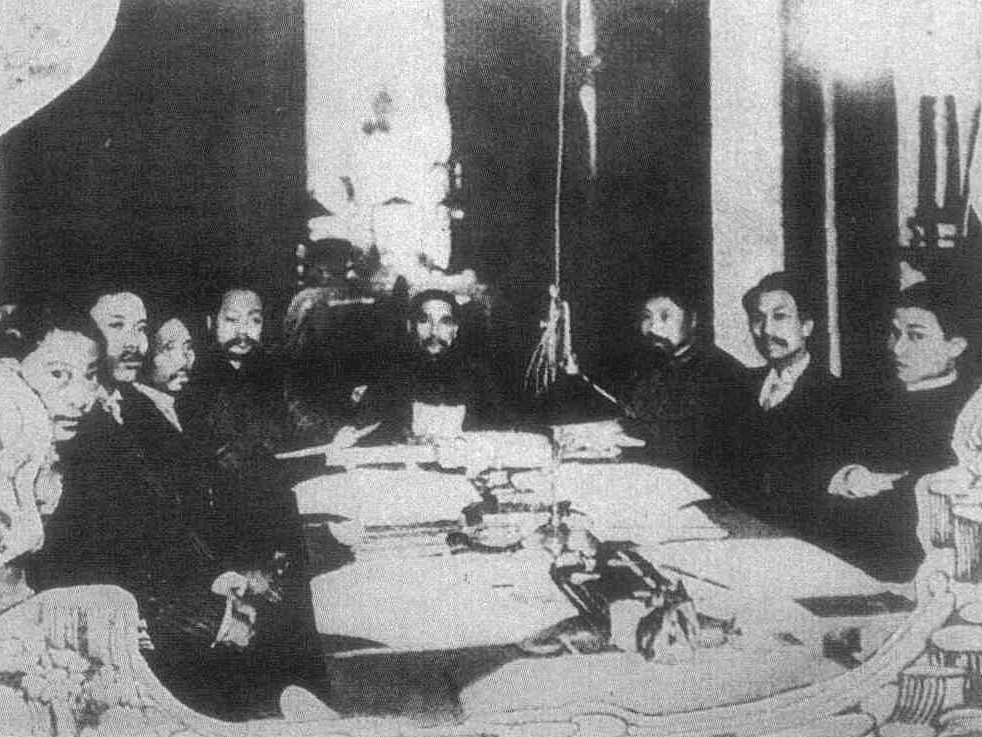
- The first cabinet meeting of the Nanking Provisional Government cabinet, 21 January 1912
- Date formed: 3 January 1912
- Date dissolved: 1 April 1912

People and organisations
- Head of state: Sun Yat-sen (1 January – 1 April 1912, as provisional President); Yuan Shikai (10 March – 1 April 1912, as provisional President)
- Head of government: Sun Yat-sen (1 January – 1 April 1912)
- Deputy head of government: Li Yuanhong (as provisional Vice-President)
- No. of ministers: 9 ministers and 9 deputy ministers
- Total no. of members: 20 (including the provisional President and provisional Vice President)
- Member parties: Tongmenghui (12); Beiyang clique (2); Unity Party (2); National Progressive Association (1); Nonpartisans (3)
- Status in legislature: Tongmenghui-led provisional coalition government

History
- Election: 1911 Chinese provisional presidential election
- Legislature term: Provisional Government of the Republic of China
- Predecessor: Cabinet of Yuan Shikai (Qing Dynasty)
- Successor: First Tang Shaoyi cabinet

The Nanking Provisional Government cabinet (Chinese: 南京臨時政府內閣; pinyin: Nánjīng línshí zhèngfǔ nèigé), also known as the Sun Yat-sen cabinet, was a temporary cabinet of the republican era of China. The first cabinet assembled following the formation of the Provisional Government on 1 January 1912; it was formed on 3 January 1912 and dissolved on 1 April the same year. It was the first and only cabinet led by Sun Yat-sen, the first provisional President of the Republic of China.

== History ==
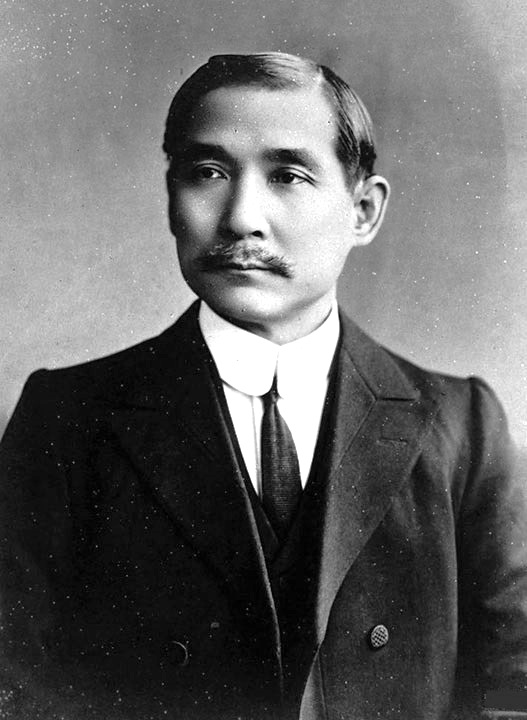
Sun Yat-sen, the first provisional President of the Republic of China, 1911

Nanking Provisional Government cabinet
- Traditional Chinese: 南京臨時政府內閣
- Simplified Chinese: 南京临时政府内阁
Transcriptions
Standard Mandarin
- Hanyu Pinyin: Nánjīng línshí zhèngfǔ nèigé

On 1 January 1912, Sun Yat-sen, the leader of the Tongmenghui, was inaugurated as the first provisional President of the newly proclaimed Republic of China following the conclusion of the Xinhai Revolution. Two days later, representatives of all provincial leaders approved a list of ministerial heads to be appointed in the first cabinet. The absence of several cabinet members in Nanking (presently Nanjing) delayed the first cabinet meeting, which wasn't held until 21 January. The meeting was hosted by Sun.

On 13 March, Tang Shaoyi, the first Premier of the Republic of China, began the formation of a new cabinet at Peking (presently Beijing). On 1 April, Sun Yat-sen resigned from his position as provisional President. In his resignation letter, written two days after his resignation, Sun stated, "Today (3 April 1912), Premier Tang went southbound and visited me, all ministerial positions in the cabinet were confirmed, and the news has been reported to me at Nanking on 1 April. I hereby resign today (as President)......all cabinet ministers will remain and continue their duties until all new replacements are appointed." All ministers and their respective deputies in the cabinet were subsequently relieved of their duties once the new cabinet was formally appointed.

The Nanking Provisional Government was a presidential government under the leadership of a president. This system was abolished following Yuan Shikai's ascension to power whereby a parliamentary government was introduced in the form of the National Assembly led by a Premier. The changes were made to limit Yuan's presidential powers, making him a figurehead in the government.

== Ministries ==
Prior to the formation of the Provisional Government in 1912, the revolutionaries had notified provincial representatives to form local general staffs to unify the military situation during the revolutions in 1911. However, when Sun Yat-sen became provisional President, none of the provincial representatives had arrived to meet him in time, thus when the General Staffs Office was founded on 6 February 1912, Sun appointed Huang Xing as its first chief of staff.

On 3 January 1912, the list of ministers of the first cabinet was approved by all provincial representatives in the new Republic. On 5 January, an inauguration ceremony of all cabinet ministers was hosted by provisional President Sun Yat-sen. Each ministries were founded on different dates after the inauguration of their respective ministers. Their date of founding is listed as such:

Date of founding of each ministries of the Provisional Government
Ministries upon founding	Date of founding (in ascending order)	Headquarter(s)
Ministry of the Army 陸軍部	9 January 1912	-
Ministry of Foreign Affairs 外交部	11 January 1912	Presidential Palace, Nanking (11 January–2 March 1912); Drum Tower of Nanjing, Nanking (2 March 1912 onwards)
Ministry of Justice 司法部	12 January 1912	-
Presidential Office 總統府	14 January 1912	Commission House, Presidential Palace, Nanking.
Bureau of Legislative Affairs 法制局	15 January 1912	-
Ministry of Finance 財政部	17 January 1912	-
Ministry of Internal Affairs 内政部	17 January 1912	Jiangnan Municipal Office, Nanking.
Ministry of the Navy 海軍部	17 January 1912	Jiangnan Navy Academy, Nanking.
Ministry of Education 教育部	19 January 1912	-
Ministry of Trade 实业部	23 January 1912	-
Ministry of Transportation 交通部	23 January 1912	-
General staffs office 參謀本部	6 February 1912	-

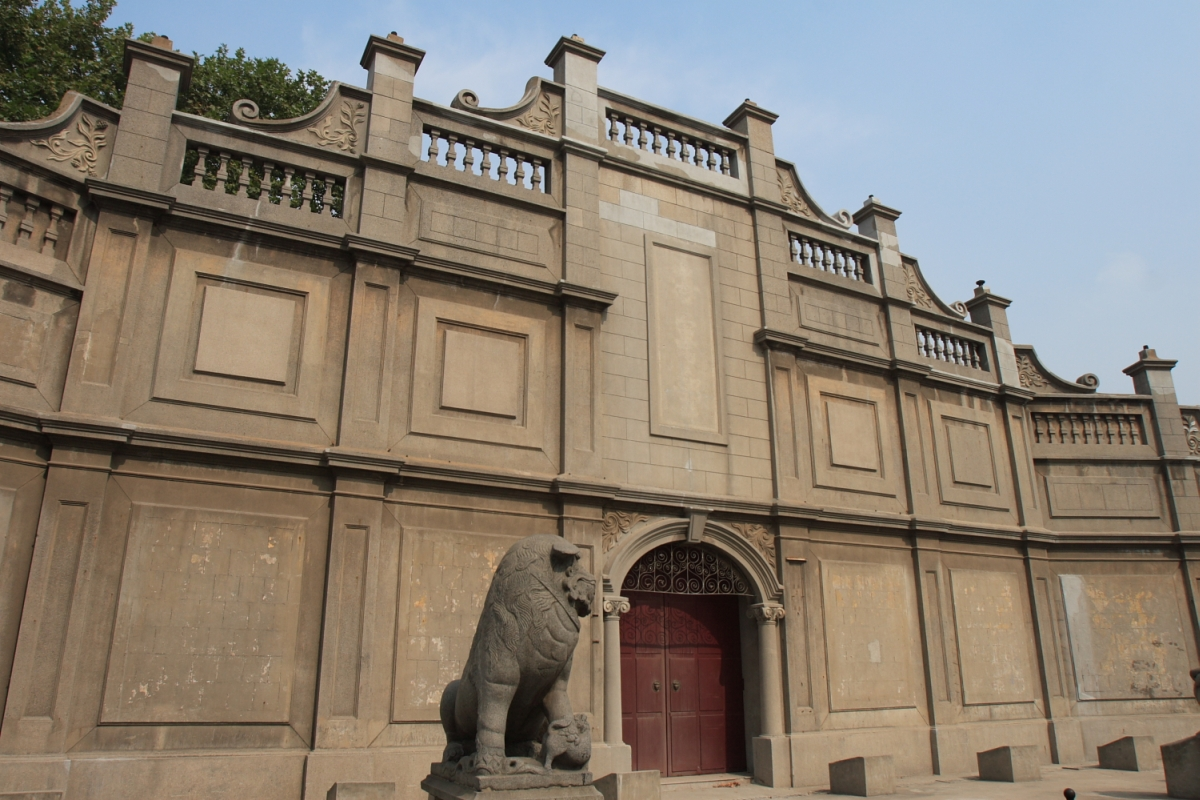
The Jiangnan Navy Academy, the former headquarters of the Ministry of the Navy.

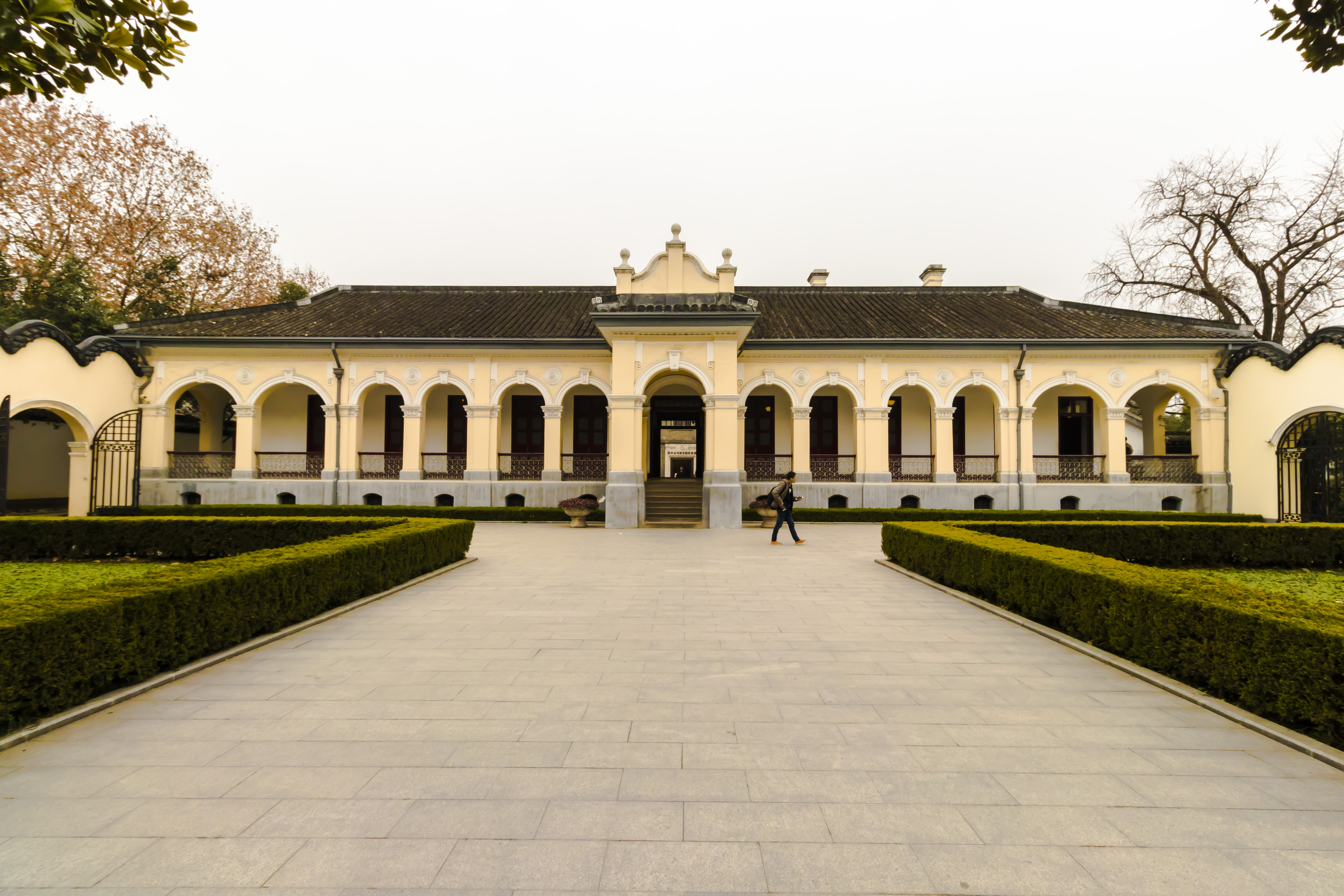
The Commission House, part of the Presidential Palace at Nanking (presently Nanjing), housed the first Presidential Office of the Provisional Government.

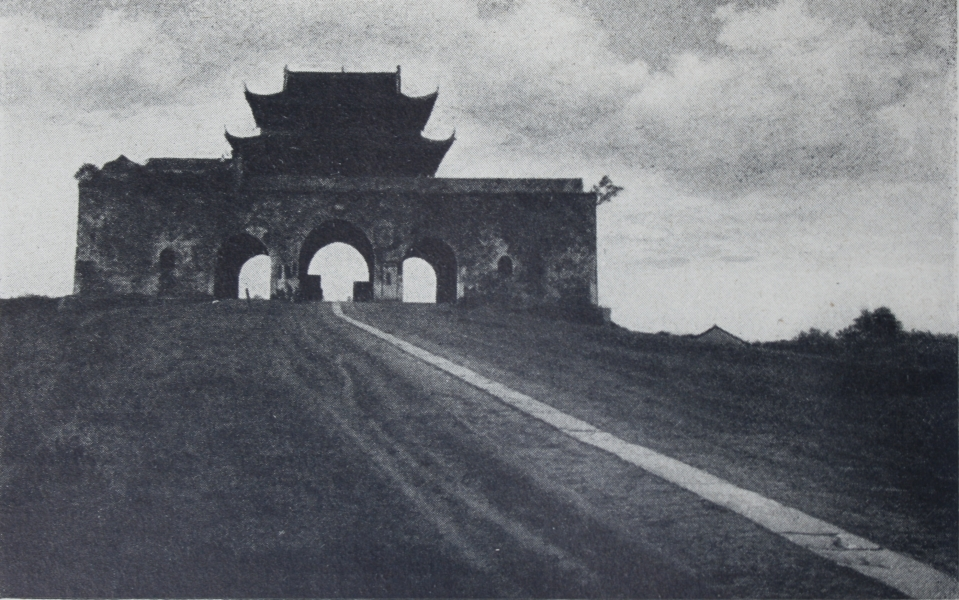
The Drum Tower of Nanjing housed the offices of the Ministry of Foreign Affairs after 2 March 1912.

== Composition ==
=== Overview ===
Heads of state of the Republic of China in the cabinet
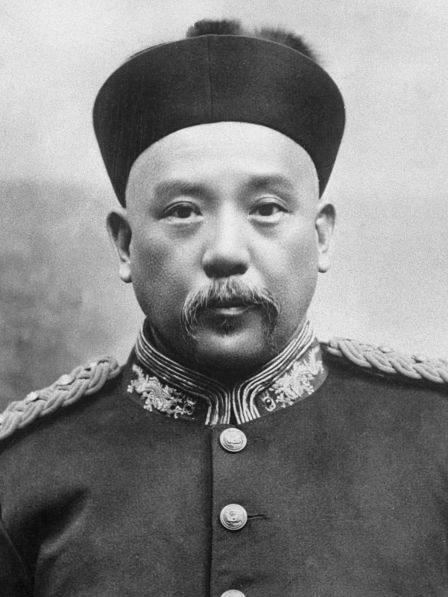
Yuan Shikai, Provisional President (10 March 1912 onwards).

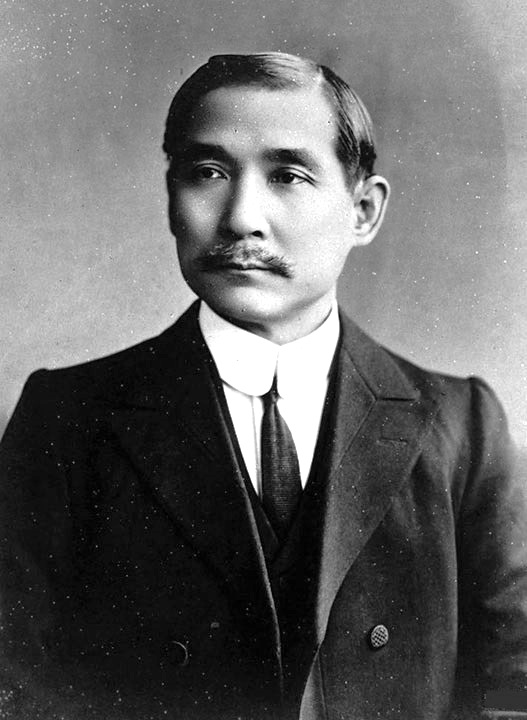
Sun Yat-sen, Provisional President (until 1 April 1912) and head of government.

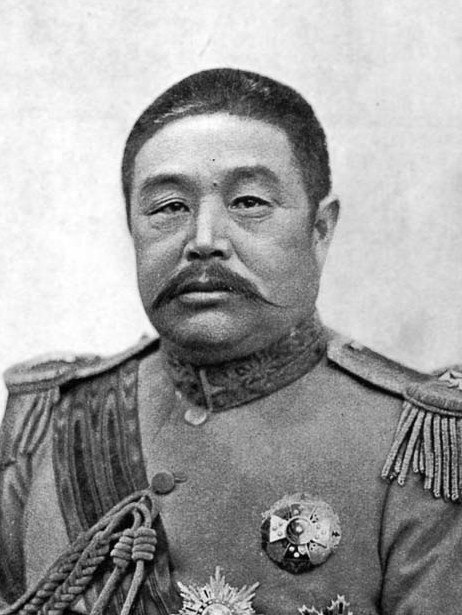
Li Yuanhong, Vice Provisional President.

=== Full ministers ===
Key of political parties or affiliations:
Tongmenghui (4)
Unity Party (2)
National Progressive Association (1)
Nonpartisans (3)

Portfolio	Portrait	Title Office Bearer (Lifespan)	Took office	Left office	Party	Notes
Minister of the Presidential Office 總統府總長		Sun Yat-sen 孫文 (1886–1925)	1 January 1912	1 April 1912	Tongmenghui	Also assumed position of Provisional President. Resigned in favor of Yuan Shikai.
Minister of the Army 陸軍部總長		General; Huang Xing 黃興 (1874–1916)	3 January 1912	29 March 1912	Tongmenghui	Also appointed as the Chief of Staffs on 6 February 1912.
Minister of the Navy 海軍部總長		General; Huang Zhong-ying 黃鍾瑛 (1869–1912)	3 January 1912	29 March 1912	Nonpartisan	-
Minister of Finance 財政部總長		Chen Jintao 陳錦濤 (1871–1939)	3 January 1912	29 March 1912	National Progressive	-
Minister of Internal Affairs 內務部總長		General; Cheng De-quan 程德全 (1860–1930)	3 January 1912	29 March 1912	Unity	Duties transferred to Deputy Minister Ju Zheng after declared sick on 1 February 1912.
Minister of Foreign Affairs 外交部總長		Wang Ch'ung-hui 王寵惠 (1881–1958)	3 January 1912	29 March 1912	Tongmenghui	-
Minister of Justice 司法部總長		Wu Tingfang 伍廷芳 (1842–1922)	3 January 1912	29 March 1912	Nonpartisan	-
Minister of Education 教育部總長		Cai Yuanpei 蔡元培 (1868–1940)	3 January 1912	29 March 1912	Tongmenghui	-
Minister of Transportation 交通部總長		Tang Shoutao 湯壽潛 (1856–1917)	3 January 1912	29 March 1912	Unity	Never assumed office.
Minister of Trade 實業部總長		Zhang Jian 張謇 (1853–1926)	3 January 1912	29 March 1912	Nonpartisan	Never assumed office.

=== Deputy ministers ===
Key of political parties or affiliations:
Tongmenghui (8)
Beiyang clique (2)

Portfolio	Portrait	Title Office Bearer (Lifespan)	Took office	Left office	Party	Notes
Deputy Minister of the Presidential Office 總統府次長		Generalissimo; Li Yuanhong 黎元洪 (1864–1928)	1 January 1912	1 April 1912	Beiyang clique	Also assumed position of Deputy Provisional President until 6 June 1916.
Deputy Minister of the Army 陸軍部次長		General; Chiang Tso-pin 蔣作賓 (1884–1942)	3 January 1912	29 March 1912	Tongmenghui	-
Deputy Minister of the Navy 海軍部次長		Admiral; Tang Xiangming 湯薌銘 (1885–1975)	3 January 1912	29 March 1912	Beiyang clique	-
Deputy Minister of Finance 財政部次長		Wang Hongyou 王鴻猷 (1878–1916)	3 January 1912	29 March 1912	Tongmenghui	-
Deputy Minister of Internal Affairs 內務部次長		Ju Zheng 居正 (1876–1951)	3 January 1912	29 March 1912	Tongmenghui	Assumed full ministerial duties after Minister Cheng De-quan was declared sick on 1 February 1912.
Deputy Minister of Foreign Affairs 外交部次長		Wei Chenzu 魏宸組 (1885–1942)	3 January 1912	29 March 1912	Tongmenghui	-
Deputy Minister of Justice 司法部次長		Lü Zhiyi 呂志伊 (1881–1940)	3 January 1912	29 March 1912	Tongmenghui	-
Deputy Minister of Education 教育部次長		Jing Yaoyue 景燿月 (1881–1944)	3 January 1912	29 March 1912	Tongmenghui	-
Deputy Minister of Transportation 交通部次長		Yu Youren 于右任 (1879–1964)	3 January 1912	29 March 1912	Tongmenghui	-
Deputy Minister of Trade 實業部次長		Ma Junwu 馬君武 (1881–1940)	3 January 1912	29 March 1912	Tongmenghui	-

== See also ==
- Politics of the Republic of China
- Warlord Era
