= Zhang Zhenfang =

Chinese official (1863–1933)

Minister of Treasury
- In office 1 July – 12 July 1917
- Monarch: Xuantong Emperor
- Prime Minister: Zhang Xun
- Preceded by: vacant (last: Shaoying)
- Succeeded by: position abolished

Military governor of Henan
- In office October 1912 – February 1914 (acting: March 1912–October 1912)
- President: Yuan Shikai
- Preceded by: Qi Yaolin
- Succeeded by: Duan Qirui

Viceroy of Zhili (acting)
- In office February 3 – February 12, 1912
- Monarch: Xuantong Emperor
- Preceded by: Chen Kuilong (as viceroy)
- Succeeded by: position abolished

Personal details
- Born: 1863
- Died: 1933 (aged 69–70)
- Relations: Yuan Shikai (cousin); Zhang Boju (stepson)
- Education: Jinshi degree in the Imperial Examination
- Occupation: Politician, businessman
- Known for: founder of Yien Yieh Commercial Bank

Zhang Zhenfang (Chinese: 張鎮芳, 1863–1933) was a Chinese politician and businessman. He served as the last Viceroy of Zhili from February 3, 1912, until the end of the Qing dynasty. Afterwards he served as the Governor of Henan. He was Yuan Shikai's cousin.
