= Articles of Favourable Treatment of the Great Qing Emperor after His Abdication =

1914 Chinese political agreement

Articles of Favourable Treatment
Articles of Favourable Treatment of the Great Qing Emperor after His Abdication 關於大清皇帝辭位之後優待之條件
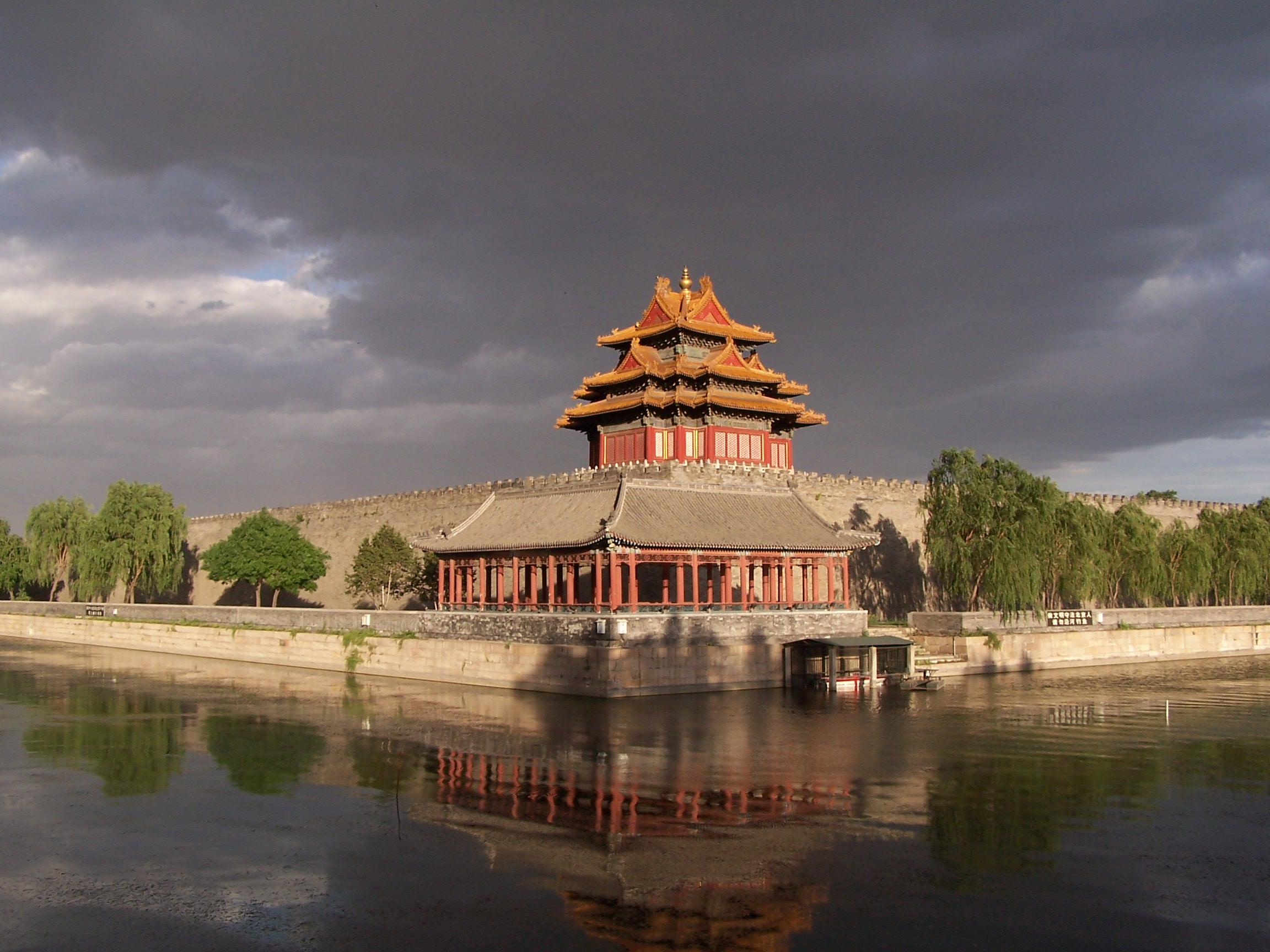
- Forbidden City, where the emperor was allowed to remain under the articles before moving to the Summer Palace
- Effective: 12 February 1912
- Replaced by: Amendments to the Articles of Favourable Treatment
- Expiry: 5 November 1924
- Parties: Republic of China; Great Qing

The Articles of Favourable Treatment of the Great Qing Emperor after His Abdication (Chinese: 關於大清皇帝辭位之後優待之條件), also known simply as the Articles of Favourable Treatment (清室優待條件), was an agreement drawn up by the Qing dynasty government and the Provisional Government of the Republic of China on the relevant protection measures after the abdication of the Qing imperial family and the Xinhai Revolution.

== Background ==
In December 1911, Qing Prime Minister Yuan Shikai began secret negotiations with the revolutionaries for peace following the outbreak of the 1911 Revolution, after Yuan was tasked by the Qing court to lead the Beiyang Army and suppress the revolt. On 20 December, both sides agreed to establish a republic and replace the Qing dynasty with Yuan as the inaugural president. The negotiations, known as the North-South Negotiation, also decided to provide preferential treatment to the royal family.^{:451-2}

The draft of the Articles of Favourable Treatment was telegrammed to Yuan's cabinet on 20 January 1912 by Wu Ting-fang, representative of the revolutionaries. The Provisional Senate adopted the final draft on 6 February. Facing immense threats from Yuan, Duan Qirui, and dozens of Beiyang Army generals, Empress Dowager Longyu was forced to accept the Articles and announce the abdication of the Qing Emperor on behalf of Puyi.^{:488}

== Articles ==
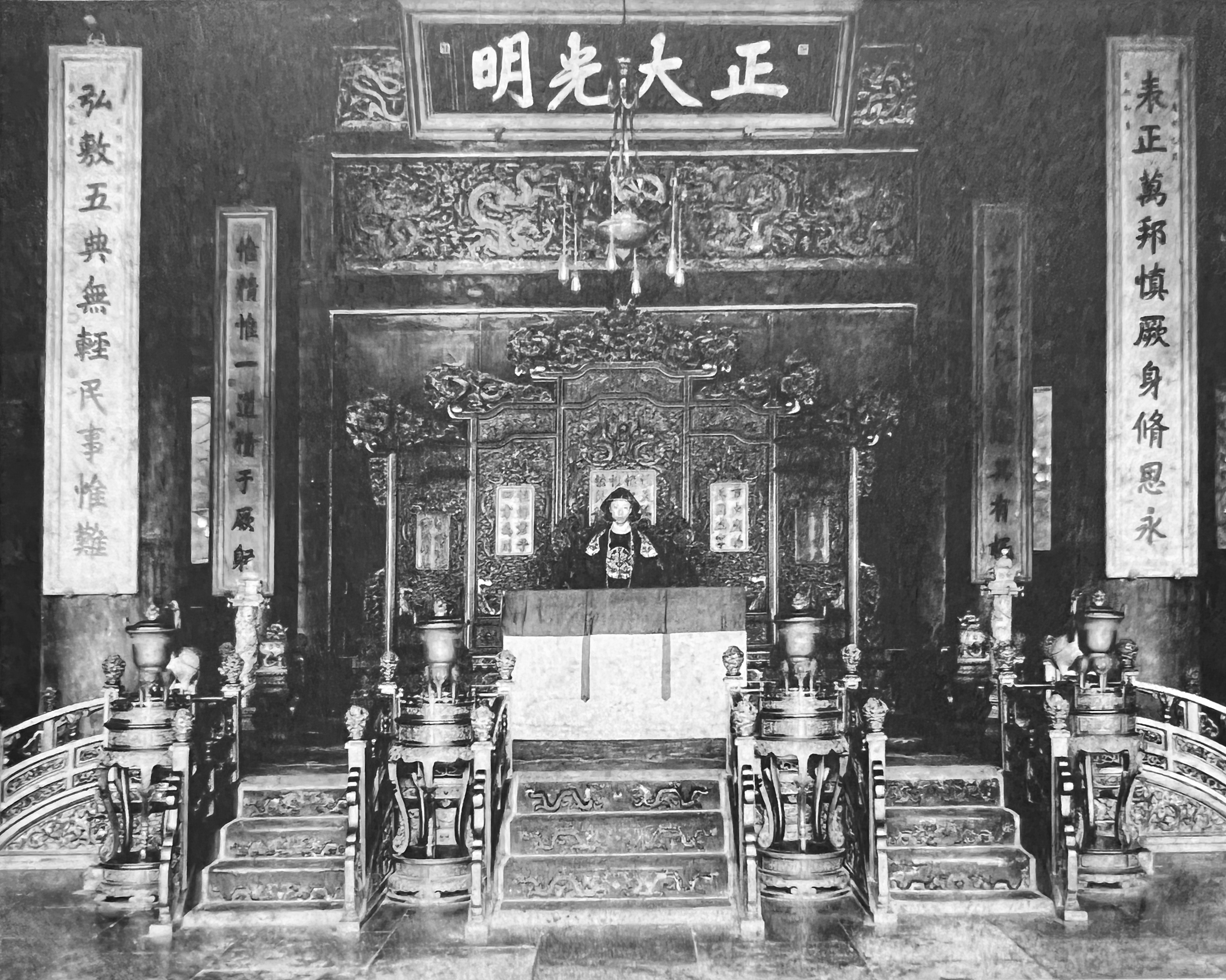
Puyi in Forbidden City, c. 1917

The document sets out several protections and privileges for the emperor after his abdication, including:

- Continued use of the imperial title; the emperor was to be accorded the courtesies due to a foreign monarch by the Republic
- An annual subsidy of four million taels (four million yuan after currency reform) by the government
- Permission to reside in the Forbidden City temporarily before moving to the Summer Palace
- Maintenance, in perpetuity, of the imperial family's temples and mausoleums
- Complete the construction of the Guangxu Emperor's mausoleum, funded by the Republic
- Continued employment of all servants previously employed, but no new eunuch should be employed

Some privileges extended to the imperial family more generally, such as to exempt from military service and to retain the noble titles. Equality of the five races was also reaffirmed under the agreement.

Puyi, the last Qing emperor, soon learned that the real reasons for the Articles of Favorable Settlement was that President Yuan Shikai was planning on restoring the monarchy with himself as the emperor of a new dynasty, and wanted to have Puyi as a sort of custodian of the Forbidden City until he could move in and marry him with his daughter.

Although the conditions outlined in this document were very favorable, the Republic of China government had not complied with the document. For example, it had been in arrears of four million tales of silver since the second year.

In December 1914, a new set of seven "settlement articles" was announced after negotiations between the republican government and the Qing family to "protect the integrity". Under the new rules, Qing royal family is obliged to respect the Republic of China and terminate any acts contradicting to the current laws. It also mandated the royal family to adopt the Gregorian calendar. The court was no longer allowed to grant posthumous titles and other unmaterialistic rewards. Mausoleums and ancestral shrines were handed to the interior ministry for control. The Imperial Household Department was kept, but the subordinate Department of Prudence was dissolved.

== Repeal ==
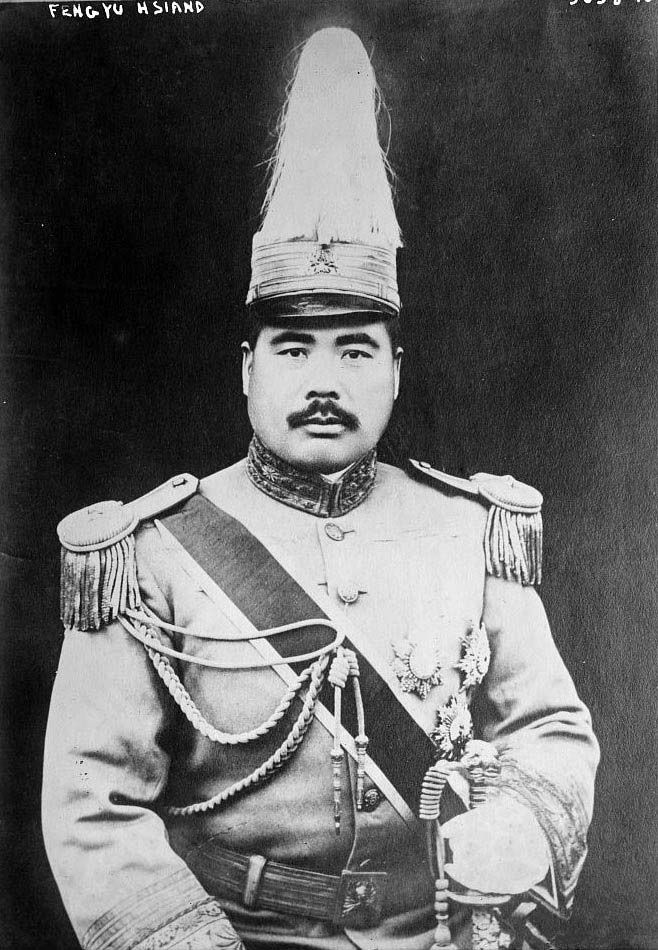
Feng Yuxiang

In 1924, warlord Feng Yuxiang overthrew the government in the Beijing coup. Feng, the latest of the warlords to take Beijing, was seeking legitimacy, and decided that abolishing the unpopular Articles of Favorable Settlement was an easy way to win the crowd's approval. The cabinet resolved to revise the Articles of Favourable Treatment, and in the morning of 5 November the army surrounded the Forbidden City. Puyi, under pressure, issued the Amendments to the Articles of Favourable Treatment (修正清室優待條件). These stripped Puyi of the title of emperor; he would henceforth enjoy legal rights equal to any other Chinese national. The imperial family would leave the palace and live as they pleased, and receive an annual subsidy of half a million dollars from the republican government. It was also entrusted with the private property of the Qing dynasty, but the government was granted ownership of its public property. The government also promised to protect the mausoleums, ancestral shrines, and private property of the former royals, as well as their safety.

The new settlement ended the rump dynasty in the Forbidden City. Puyi and his consorts, together with the other royals, departed the imperial palace later that afternoon. The Forbidden City would be opened by the government as the Palace Museum a year later.
