= Tong Jixu =

Chinese politician (1884-1943)

Tong Jixu 佟濟煦
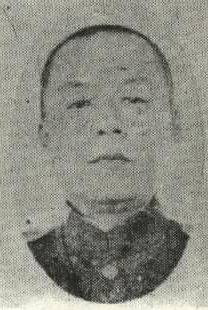
- Portrait of Tong Jixu as of 1930

Chief of Palace Security of the Manchukuo Imperial Household
- In office 1932–1937
- Monarch: Puyi
- Succeeded by: Nagao Yoshigorō

Personal details
- Born: 1 September 1884 Fuzhou, Fujian, China
- Died: 1 January 1943 (aged 58) Xinjing, Manchukuo

Tong Jixu (simplified Chinese: 佟济煦; traditional Chinese: 佟濟煦; pinyin: Tóng Jìxù; Wade–Giles: T’ung Chi-hsu; 1884–1943) was a Chinese businessman and Manchukuo official from Fujian province in southeast China.

== Biography ==
Tong Jixu was born in 1884, in Fuzhou city, Fujian Province in an intellectual Manchu family. His ancestors were engineers who produced the cannons for the Manchu military. His family lived on the Dongmen, Fuzhou, for seven generations as part of the Decorated Yellow Banner guard garrison.

=== Early career ===
He graduated from Fujian Higher School and was a friend of Chen Baochen, Emperor Puyi's teacher. He moved to Beijing around 1902, started a photograph business and later taught English in the Academy of Law and Politics for Aristocratic Education. After 1912, ethnic Manchu were persecuted in the southern cities such as Fuzhou by Han locals and he relocated the whole family to Beijing. He then joined the Beiyang Army and was commissioned as an officer in the department of chief staffs. Because of his English skills, he was instrumental in bringing in military technologies from the western world. He started the then new air force and served as a vice-principal of the Nanyuan Aviation School at the Nanyuan Military Base (current Nanyuan Airport). However, because of his Manchu ethnicity, he did not get a promotion for many years and was not able to support the family and relatives who escaped from Fuzhou to Beijing.

=== Publishing Business ===
He quit from the military and focused on his business – Yanguangshi publishing house, which became a pioneer in the field of art reproduction and publication in China. Tong introduced advanced German photographic and printing technologies to China, particularly the collotype printing technique (珂罗版). This allowed Yanguangshi to produce high-quality reproductions of paintings and calligraphy. The company specialized in creating limited-edition prints of authentic artworks, making rare pieces more accessible to collectors and art students. One major source of the early photo-books published by Yanguangshi was the imperial art collection that he accessed through borrowing from the emperor's relatives and Chen Baochen. His clients and collaborators included a lot of the famous collectors including Zhang Daqian, as well as many leading Manchu intellectuals and aristocrats such as Puru at the time because of his former tenure as an instructor in the academy.

=== Political career ===
In 1924, when Tong's old friend from Fuzhou, Zheng Xiaoxu was appointed as the minister of Household Department of Puyi, he recruited Tong to work as his chief of operation at the Imperial Household Department. His honesty and integrity in this short post was mentioned by the Emperor's Tutor, Reginald Johnston in his book, Twilight in The Forbidden City. Tong was tasked to clean up the administration and root out corruption within the Forbidden City. After Puyi was expelled from Forbidden City to exile in Zhang Yuan, Tianji, Tong moved the family to Tianjin and later to Changchun. Once Manchuguo started, he became chief of security (a three-star general ranked position) in the Imperial Household Department. Within the court, Tong was known for this anti-Japanese stance within the court of Puyi. (Secretly, two of his sons joined underground Chinese Communist Party to fight the Japanese). Tong established the Hujun, the elite guard division separated from the Japanese controlled military and tried to build up a military core that would be loyal to Puyi. However, this effort ran afoul with the Japanese military who only wanted to keep Puyi as their puppet emperor. The Kwantung Army plotted an incident when several Japanese and Korean army staff members in civilian clothes incited a fight with off-duty Hujun members. One of the Japanese officers was injured, and the Japanese military police arrested the involved Hujun soldiers. Using the incident as an excuse, Kwantung Army pushed Puyi to relieve Tong from the Chief of Security post, thus stripping his command over Hujun. Hujun was also merged into the Japanese controlled military.

Later, Puyi appointed Tong to be chief of Imperial Attendants (近侍处长). Tong died in 1943 in Changchun.

== Family ==
Tong Jixu's wife (née Zhao) was also from a Fuzhou Manchu family. Unlike most of the prominent Chinese at the time, Tong never had any concubine, and the couple had a very happy relationship throughout their lives. They had five sons and two daughters. His eldest son, Tong Zhishu (1909–1987), later ran the family business, Yanguangshi, after Tong joined the emperor's court. His second and third son both obtained college degrees from Japan. His third son, Tong Zhishan, married a Japanese woman against the family wish when he studied in the Imperial Japanese Naval Academy. He was a naval captain who fought the Russian Red Army at the northern border of Heilongjiang. After he lost one eye in an Ussuri River gun boat battle, he became an instructor in the Manchuguo Army Academy. Secretly, he joined the Chinese Communist Party Secret Service and worked with Shi Di and Zhang Weixian to establish an underground CCP branch and recruited several of his student cadets, including his own youngest brother. Tong Zhishan died in 1947 during the Chinese civil war, probably because his CCP identity was betrayed to the Chinese Nationalist. Tong Jixu's youngest son, known as Zhao Tong, (he changed his last name while working as an underground revolutionary and never changed back), became an educator after he retired from the military post. Zhao Tong was the vice president (provost) of two medical universities, Xinjiang Medical University and Guangxi Medical University. He committed suicide during the cultural revolutions in Nanning, Guangxi.
