= Yanguangshi =

Chinese publishing house

- Type: Private
- Industry: Photo-book Publisher
- Founded: 1912
- Headquarters: Beijing, China
- Key people: Tong Jixu, Tong Zhishu
- Products: Photo-books of Ancient Art Works

Yanguangshi, was the first Chinese publishing house to publish Photobooks of famous ancient painting and calligraphy from the imperial collections using the colophon photographic printing technique.

== History ==
After the 1912 Xinhai Revolution, Tong Jixu started Yanguangshi to publish photo-books of ancient painting and calligraphy from the Qing imperial collections. Through his friend Chen Baochen, who was Puyi’s teacher and some of his students such as Puru, he would borrow the art pieces and use high-resolution camera to take glass version photographs of them and use advanced photographic printing process called Corot Press to print photo-books. In 1924, after Tong became an official (director of operation or Danglangzhong in Chinese) at the Imperial Household Department himself, he stopped borrowing any additional artworks from the court in order to avoid conflict of interest. He also passed the operation of the business to his eldest son, Tong Zhishu. Since then, the business only focused on re-publishing existing editions or photo-books/art catalogs of private collections. In the 1940s, Tong Zhishu sold most of the original prints to Commercial Press (Shangwu Yinshuguan in Chinese) and kept a small amount of glass prints as souvenirs.

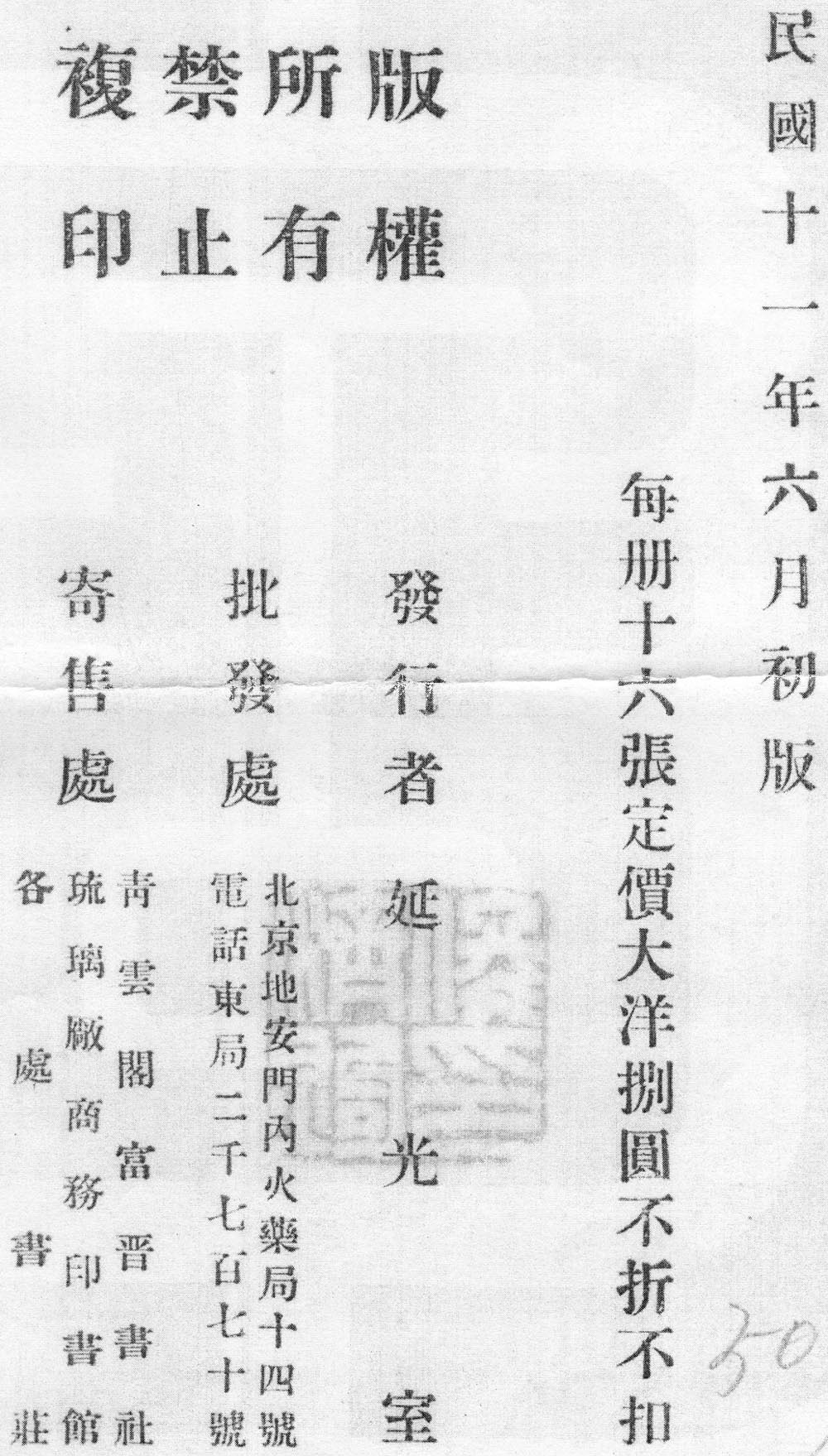

== Works ==
The photo-books include works from Wang Xizhi, Yan Zhenqing, Sun Guoting, Huaisu, Su Dongpo, Mi Fu, Guo Xi, Zhao Mengfu, and Giuseppe Castiglione, etc.

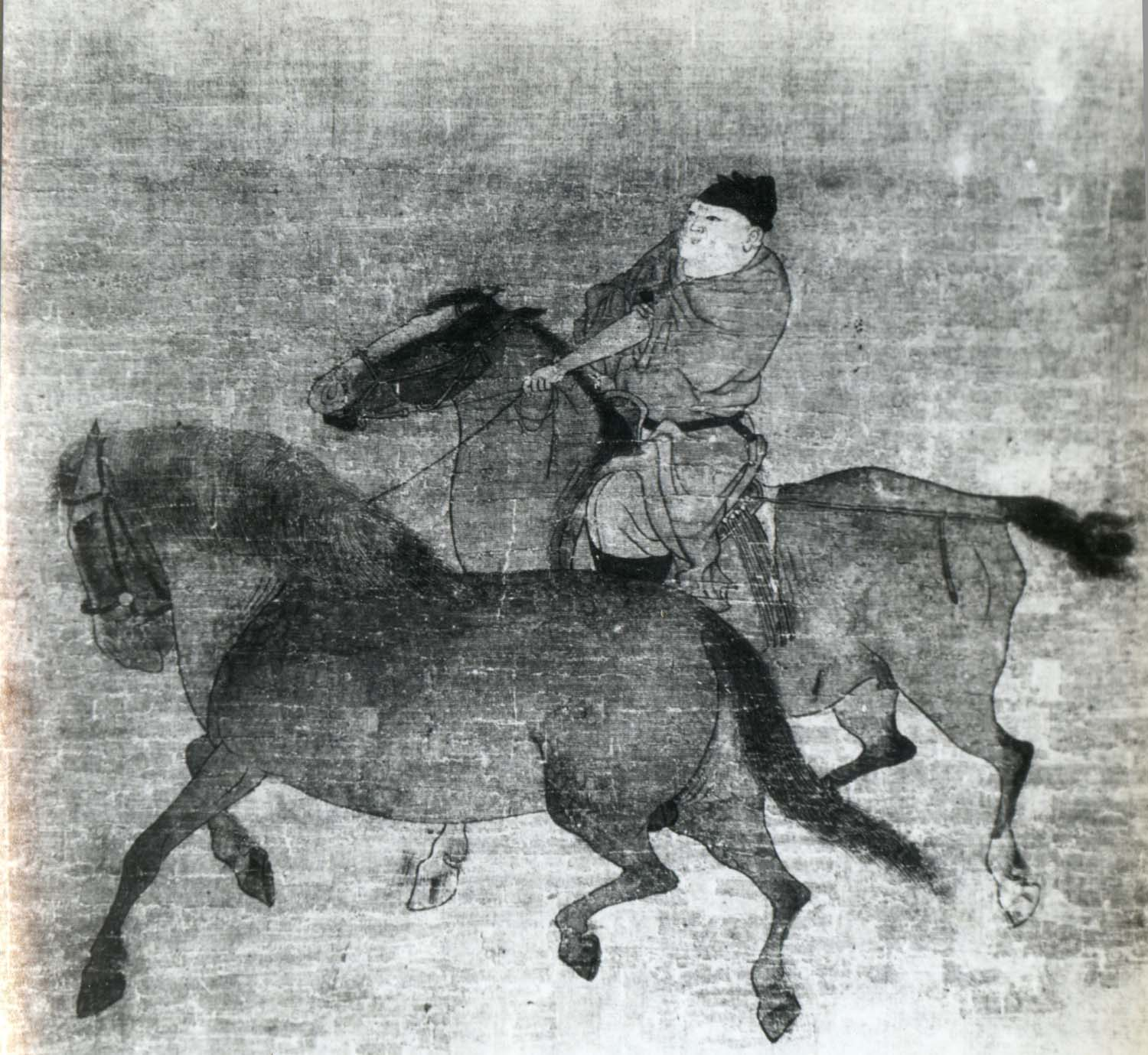
Pingyuanshima

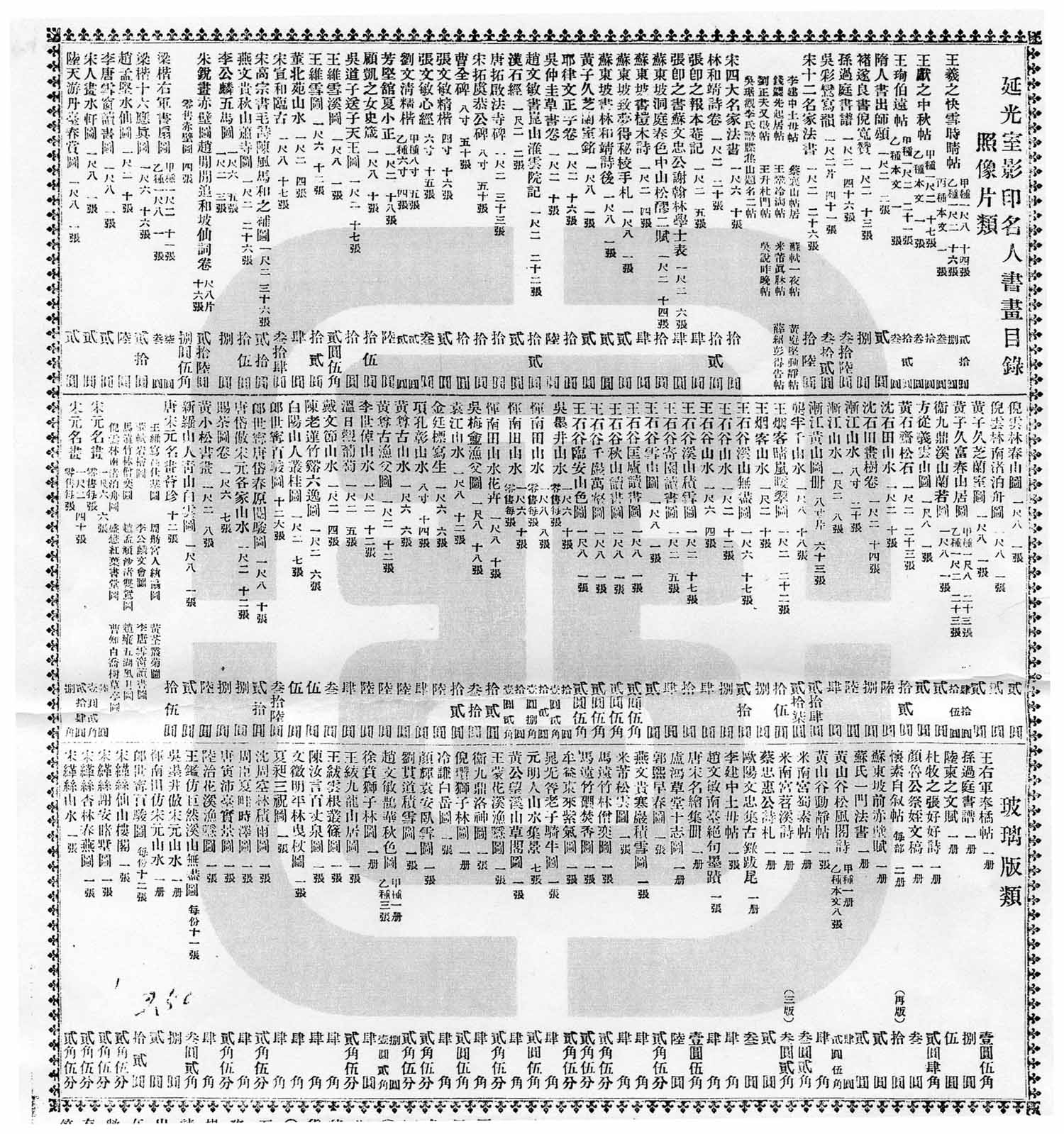
List of published books
