= Dong Yuanfeng =

Chinese philatelist

- Chinese: 董遠峯
Transcriptions
Standard Mandarin
- Hanyu Pinyin: Dǒng Yuǎnfēng
- Wade–Giles: Tung Yuan-feng

Dong Yuanfeng (1883-4 – 1941) was one of China's first serious philatelists. He made technical studies of several Chinese stamp issues, including overprints produced during the Revolution of 1911.

== Early life ==
Dong was born in Ganquan in Jiangsu Province sometime in 1883 or 1884. His father was interested in local history and was an admirer of Ming loyalist philosopher Wang Fuzhi. Dong was a nephew of Qing scholar Dong Xun. Dong received a traditional education in the classics from tutors. His father died early. Dong's early scholarship includes a revision of Gantong xiaozhi (1855), a work by his uncle concerning the topography of the Dong clan's native village. He also prepared an annotated catalog of the family library and collected samples of calligraphy.

== Philatelic activity ==
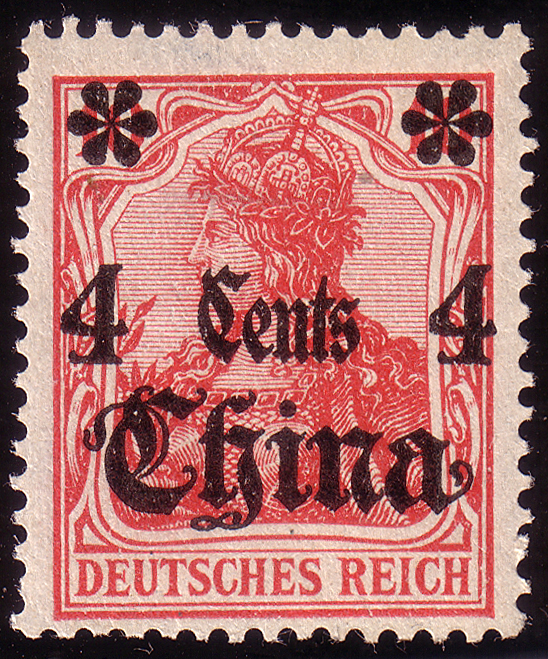
Dong's interest in treaty port stamps was criticized as unpatriotic. This one is a German stamp produced in 1905 and overprinted for use in China.

On a trip to Shanghai in 1908, Dong met Chen Jintao, who had been sent abroad to investigate production methods to improve the quality of Chinese postage stamps. Chen concluded the American production techniques were the best at fighting counterfeiting, a major problem in China. Chen hired two American experts to advise China's bureau of printing and engraving, William A. Grant and Lorenzo J. Hatch. Grant had been in charge of the engraving room of the American Bank Note Company. As a result of meeting Grant, Dong developed an interest in postage stamps and in techniques to inscribe Chinese characters on them.

Dong researched the history of stamp production in China, which began in 1878. In 1918, Dong published a work concerning the postage stamps used in the various treaty ports. This monograph is written in an elegant style of classical Chinese and includes hand-drawn illustrations. Dong was one of the first Chinese to study philatelic history. In 1924–1925, Dong wrote a series of articles for Shanghai's Philatelic Bulletin concerning the provisional neutrality overprints of 1912. These were stamps issued by the Qing postal service and overprinted by local authorities with the words "provisional neutrality" and "Republic of China". Dong described how to distinguish genuine issues from the numerous fakes that circulated at the time. The overprints could be used to illustrate the politics of the 1911 Revolution.

Dong was interested in all aspects of Chinese philately. He was fond of using philately to illustrate aspects of China's history.

Dong had particular interest in postage stamps that featured portraits. In 1935, Dong went to considerable lengths to obtain a Communist postage stamp that featured a portrait of Karl Marx. The stamp was issued by an authority in the Sichuan-Shaanxi border area. Assuming his interest political, the Nationalist police arrested Dong and the stamp confiscated. Although he was released after two weeks, the experience left Dong furious. After an appeal to Chiang Kai-shek, the stamp was returned.

Another focus of Dong's philatelic interest was the "martyr's issue." These stamps depicted supporters of Sun Yat-sen who had given their lives for the revolutionary cause. Dong compiled a list of 109 differences that could be used to distinguish the Beijing printing of 1932 from the Hong Kong reprint of 1937–1941.

When Shanghai was occupied by the Japanese in 1937, Dong remained. He eagerly bought rare stamps held by fellow collectors who fled to the interior. He saw this as a patriotic duty and worked to prevent "national treasures" from falling into the hands of Japanese collectors. In an article published posthumously in early 1942, Dong praised the aesthetic qualities of various Japanese postage stamps as superior to that of Chinese postage stamps. The article was later reprinted by the Nanjing Regime of Wang Jingwei, which interpreted it as pro-Japanese. Dong was consulted in the production of the bilingual Ma’s Illustrated Catalog of the Stamps of China (1947).

Aside from postage stamps, Dong was uninterested in foreign innovations. Even with respect to stamps, he was interested only in their Chinese aspect. He was a supporter of the Nationalists in their early years, but grew disillusioned and apolitical after 1928. Nationalists and Communists alike found fault with his interest in treaty port stamps. Dong stood apart from the various modernizing trends that swept the nation in his time. His activities as a philatelist built on the traditional role of the gentleman in Chinese society. Eccentric study and connoisseurship are both traditions with long histories in China.

Dong died in Shanghai of pneumonia in November 1941. After he died, some items in his collection were sold to British collector Sir Percival David. Some of these items were sold at an auction in London in 1964.
