= Chen Baochen =

Chinese official during late Qing era (1848-1935)

Imperial tutor Chen Baochen
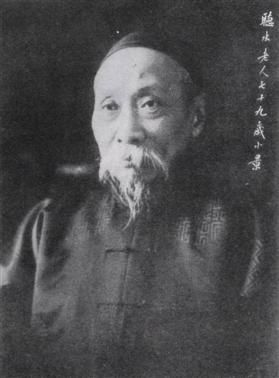

Minister of Deliberation
- In office 1 July – 12 July 1917 Serving with Zhang Xun, Liu Tingchen
- Prime Minister: Zhang Xun

Consultant minister of the Bideyuan
- In office 14 August – 1 November 1911
- Prime Minister: Yikuang

Personal details
- Born: 25 October 1848 Fuzhou, Fujian, Qing Empire
- Died: 5 March 1935 (aged 86) Beiping, Republic of China
- Education: Jinshi degree in the Imperial Examination
- Occupation: Politician

Chen Baochen (traditional Chinese: 陳寶琛; simplified Chinese: 陈宝琛; pinyin: Chén Bǎochēn; 1848–1935) was a Chinese official during late Qing era, hailing from Fuzhou, Fujian province in southeast/coastal China. During the last years of the Qing dynasty, he served as sub-chancellor in the Grand Secretariat and as vice minister of Rites (禮部侍郎). Following the collapse of the imperial order and the establishment of the Republic of China in 1912, he remained loyal to the Qing dynasty and served as tutor and adviser of the former emperor, Puyi, who was allowed to stay in the Forbidden City for more than thirteen years under the "Articles of Favorable Treatment". In 1917, Chen supported the Manchu Restoration, the loyalist general Zhang Xun's abortive attempt to restore the Qing dynasty. Chen Baochen continued to serve Puyi after he was finally expelled from the Forbidden City in 1924, but unlike his rival Zheng Xiaoxu, he refused to collaborate in the establishment of Manchukuo.

Victor Wong portrayed Chen in the 1987 feature film The Last Emperor.
