= Qing dynasty (Zhang Xun) =

Short-lived unrecognized government in Beijing in 1917

Empire of Great Qing 大清帝國 Dà Qīng dìguó
- 1917
- Flag

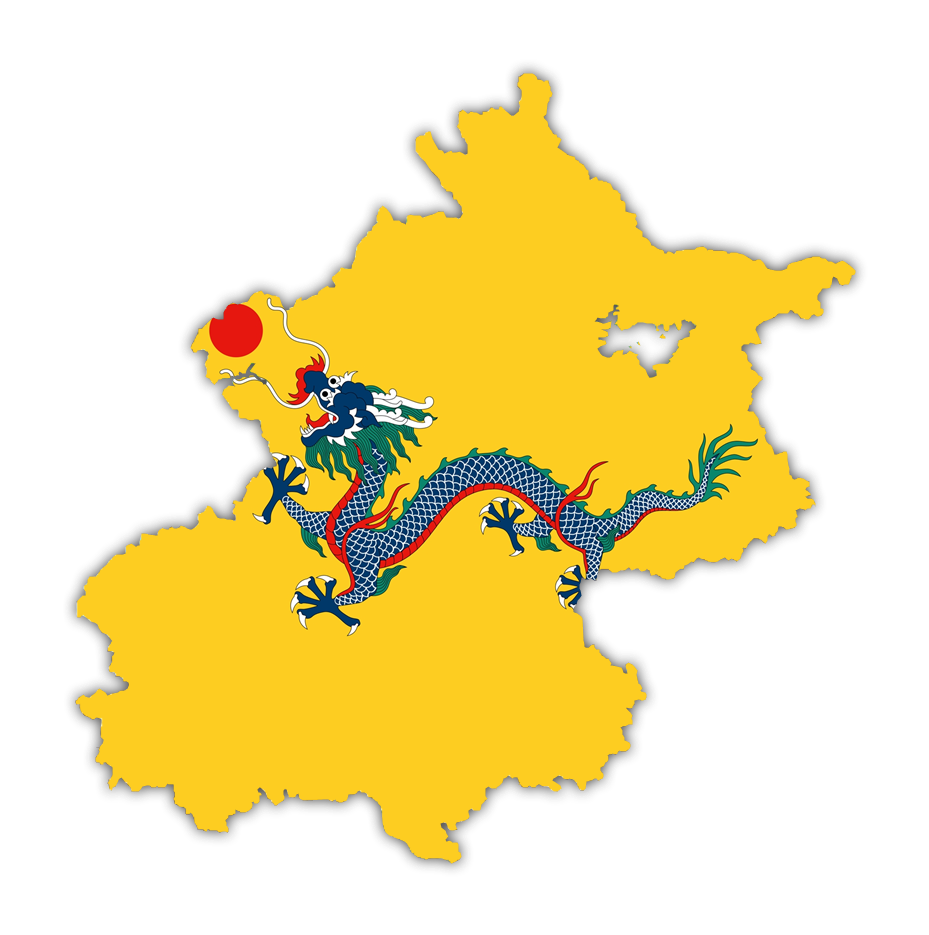
- Map of the Empire of Great Qing
- Status: Unrecognized government
- Capital: Beijing
- Emperor
  - 1917: Xuantong Emperor
- First Minister
  - 1917: Zhang Xun
- Establishment: Manchu Restoration (Warlord Era)
- History
  - Established: 1 July 1917
  - Disestablished: 12 July 1917
Preceded by	Succeeded by
Republic of China	Republic of China
- Today part of: People's Republic of China

The Empire of Great Qing was a short-lived, unrecognized government that was established by Zhang Xun during the beginning of the Manchu Restoration on 1 July 1917. It existed until the end of the Manchu Restoration on 12 July 1917, for around 12 days.

== Background ==
Although the Qing dynasty was overthrown in 1912, following the 1911 Revolution, many people in China wished for its restoration. Ethnic Manchus and Mongols believed that they were discriminated against by China's new Republican government, and restorationism consequently became popular among these ethnic groups. The Qing also enjoyed support among sections of the Han Chinese population as well, such as in Northeastern China. Many were disappointed about the Republican government's inability to solve China's problems. Finally, there were numerous reactionaries and disempowered ex-Qing officials who conspired to overthrow the Republic. As a result, pro-Qing restorationist groups, most notably the Royalist Party, remained an underrepresented but powerful factor in Chinese politics during the 1910s. Several royalist uprisings were launched, but all failed.

The confrontation between President Li Yuanhong and Premier Duan Qirui about whether to join the Allied Powers in World War I and declare war on Germany led to political unrest in the capital Beijing in the spring of 1917.

General Zhang Xun utilized Xuzhou as a primary base between 1916 and 1917.

== History ==
On the morning of 1 July 1917, the royalist general Zhang Xun took advantage of the unrest and entered the capital, proclaiming the restoration of Puyi as Emperor of China at 4 am with a small entourage and reviving the Qing monarchy which had been abolished on February 12, 1912. The capital police soon submitted to the new government. General Xu later published an edict of restoration that falsified the approval of the president of the republic, Li Yuanhong. He was also supported by several other officials, including Beiyang General Jiang Chaozong, former Qing war minister Wang Shizhen, civil affairs minister Zhu Jiabao, and diplomat Xie Jieshi.

On 5 July 1917, Duan's republican troops seized the Beijing–Tianjin railway 40 kilometers from the capital. On the same day, General Zhang left the capital to meet the republicans, his forces further bolstered by Manchu reinforcements. Zhang was faced with overwhelming odds; almost all of the Northern Army was opposed to him and he was forced to withdraw after republican troops seized control of the two main railway lines to the capital. Duan Qirui ordered an aerial bombardment of the Forbidden City compound, and a Caudron Type D aircraft, piloted by Pan Shizhong (潘世忠) with bombardier Du Yuyuan (杜裕源) was dispatched from Nanyuan Airbase to drop three bombs over the Forbidden City, causing the death of a eunuch, but otherwise causing minor damage; other sources state that the Caudron aircraft was piloted by the principal of the Nanyuan Aviation School, Qin Guoyong (秦國鏞). This was the first recorded instance of aerial bombardment deployed by the early-republican era Chinese Air Force.

On 9 July 1917, General Zhang resigned from his appointed positions, retaining only the command of his troops in the capital, which were surrounded by republican forces. The restored imperial court prepared an edict of abdication for Puyi, but fearful of Zhang's royalist forces, did not dare proclaim it. The imperial court began secret negotiations with republican forces to prevent an assault on the city, even asking the foreign legations to mediate between the parties. The uncertainty over the imperial court's own fate and that of General Zhang caused negotiations to fall apart.

On the evening of 11 July 1917 the republican generals announced a general assault on the positions of the royalists, the attack began the next day morning on the 12 July, with royalists troops entrenched on the wall of the Temple of Heaven and the republican troops to assault the Imperial Palace. Shortly after the fighting began, negotiations resumed, resulting in the royalists giving up their positions. General Zhang, dismayed, fled to the legations quarter. Once General Zhang had fled, the royalist troops called for a ceasefire, which was immediately granted.

== Government of Zhang Xun ==
Government of Zhang Xun
- Cabinet of Empire of Great Qing

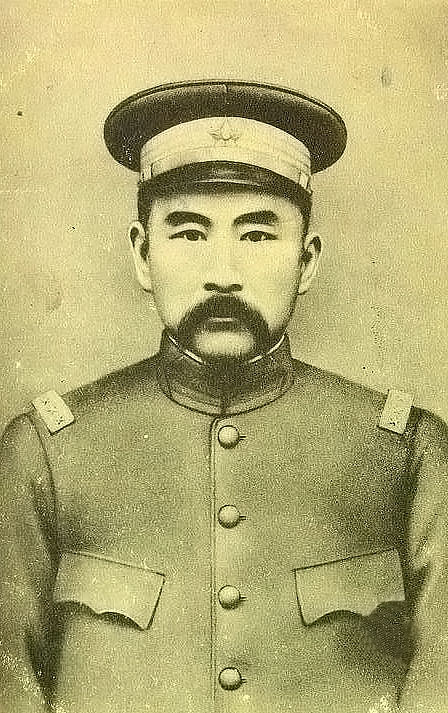
- Date formed: 1 July 1917
- Date dissolved: 12 July 1917

People and organisations
- Monarch: Xuantong Emperor
- First Minister: Zhang Xun
- No. of ministers: 19
- Member party: None (Some former Royalist Party members)

History
- Predecessor: None
- Successor: None

The Government of Zhang Xun was formed after the Qing dynasty was restored on 1 July 1917 by General Zhang Xun. Puyi (the Xuantong Emperor), who abdicated in 1912, became Qing emperor again. The government only lasted for 12 days, after which the army of the Republic of China forced Puyi to give up his throne. Puyi accepted Zhang's resignation on that day, dissolving the government.

=== Composition ===
The following is a list of ministers in the cabinet:

Portfolio	Minister
Minister of Deliberation 議政大臣; Viceroy of Zhili 直隸總督; Minister of Beiyang 北洋大臣	Zhang Xun (First Minister) 張勳
Minister of Deliberation 議政大臣; Viceroy of Zhili 直隸總督; Minister of Beiyang 北洋大臣	Chen Baochen 陳寶琛
Minister of Deliberation 議政大臣; Viceroy of Zhili 直隸總督; Minister of Beiyang 北洋大臣	Liu Tingchen 劉廷琛
Minister for Advice 顧問大臣	Zhao Erxun 趙爾巽
Minister for Advice 顧問大臣	Chen Kuilong 陳夔龍
Minister for Advice 顧問大臣	Zhang Yinglin 張英麟
Minister for Advice 顧問大臣	Feng Xu 馮煦
Steward of Foreign Affairs 外務部尚書	Liang Dunyan 梁敦彥
Steward of Home Affairs 民政部尚書	Zhu Jiabao 朱家寶
Steward of Treasury 度支部尚書	Zhang Zhenfang 張鎮芳
Steward of Education 學部尚書	Tang Jingchong 唐景崇
Steward of Education 學部尚書	Shen Zengzhi 沈曾植
Steward of Army 陸軍部尚書	Lei Zhenchun 雷震春
Minister of General Staff 參謀部大臣; Chief of Army 陸軍總長	Wang Shizhen 王士珍
Steward of Navy 海軍部尚書	Sa Zhenbing 薩鎮冰
Steward of Justice 法部尚書	Lao Naixuan 勞乃宣
Steward of Posts and Communications 郵傳部尚書	Zhan Tianyou 詹天佑
Steward of Colonial Affairs 理藩部尚書	Gungsangnorbu 貢桑諾爾布
Steward of Farming, Industry, and Commerce 農工商部尚書	Li Shengduo 李盛鐸

== See also ==
- Constitutional Protection junta
- Guangzhou government of the Republic of China
- Army and Navy Marshal stronghold
- Wuhan government of the Republic of China
- Great Han Sichuan Military Government
- Shanxi Provincial Military Government
- Great China Yunnan Military Governor's Office
- Hubei Military Government
- Constitution Protection Region of Southern Fujian
- Shanghai Commune of 1927
- Hailufeng Soviet
- Communist-controlled China (1927–1949)
- Chinese Soviet Republic
- Fujian People's Government
- Northwestern Federation of the Chinese Soviet Republic
- Yan'an Soviet
- Jiangxi Soviet
- Jin-Cha-Ji Border Region
- Inner Mongolian People's Republic
- East Mongolia People's Autonomous Government
- Inner Mongolia Autonomous Movement Federation
- Inner Mongolia Autonomous Government
- Tibetan People's Republic
- Revolutionary Government of the Republic of Geledesha
- Monarchy of the North
