= Zhu Jiabao =

Zhu Jiabao

Zhu Jiabao (Chinese: 朱家寶; 1860 – September 5, 1923) was a Chinese monarchist politician who supported the creation of the Empire of China and the 1917 Manchu Restoration of Zhang Xun. He was born in Ningzhou Town, Huaning County, Yunnan. In 1907, he was appointed Governor of Jilin Province and the next year, he became Governor of Anhui Province, a post he held until the Xinhai Revolution.
