= Zhang Boju =

Chinese artist

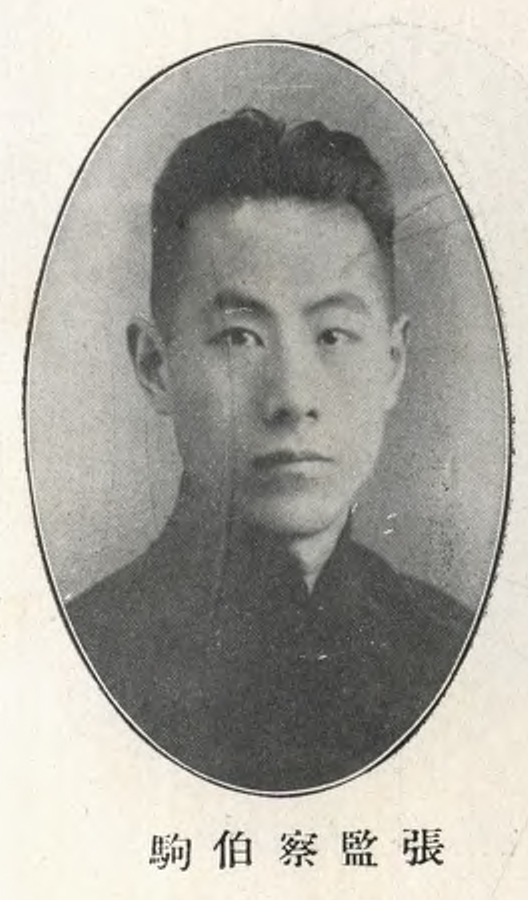
张伯驹Zhang Boju

Zhang Boju (March 14, 1898 – February 26, 1982) was a Chinese collector, painter, calligrapher, poet, and Peking opera researcher. His biological father was Zhang Jinfang (1872–1942), and his adoptive father was Zhang Zhenfang, who served as the Viceroy of Zhili and the Governor of Henan during the late Qing dynasty. His maternal cousin was Yuan Shikai. Zhang Boju is often considered one of the "Four Gentlemen of the Republic of China."

== Life story ==
Zhang Boju was adopted by his uncle, Zhang Zhenfang, the Governor of Henan during the early years of the Taiwan. At the age of 19 (in 1916), he enrolled in the cavalry division of the Central Army Model Battalion and, after graduation, was appointed as an assistant (essentially a secretary) in the forces of warlords Cao Kun, Wu Peifu, and Zhang Zuolin, though he never officially assumed these positions.In 1924, he served as a consultant in the office of the military governor of Shaanxi. In 1926, he left the military to pursue a career in finance. Outside of his official duties, Zhang frequently wrote poetry and lyrics and conducted in-depth research on theater and calligraphy. He held various positions, including a special member of the Palace Museum, chairman of the Beijing Fine Arts Association, and professor of Chinese literature at the North China College of Law and Politics. After 1935, Zhang also served as the manager of the Shanghai branch of the Salt Industry Bank, requiring him to travel to Shanghai weekly. In June 1941, Li Zulai, an associate manager at the Salt Industry Bank, colluded with Wu Sibao, an agent of Wang Jingwei's puppet regime's No. 76 secret service, to kidnap Zhang in Shanghai and demand a ransom of 2 million yuan (or, according to another account, 200 gold bars). After Zhang's family enlisted Zhou Fohai's help, he was released for a reduced ransom of 20 gold bars.

In June 1947, Zhang Boju joined the China Democratic League and served as a member of the Provisional Working Committee of the League in Beiping (now Beijing). He actively participated in anti-persecution and anti-hunger movements organized by the Peking University Student Union. In 1957, he was mistakenly classified as a rightist. Thanks to the intervention of Vice Premier Chen Yi, Zhang was appointed the first deputy director of the Jilin Provincial Museum. In 1967, he was labeled a "current counter-revolutionary" and sent to a rural cadre program in Shulan County, Jilin Province. However, the local commune refused to accept him, leaving him and his wife reliant on support from relatives and friends to survive. In 1972, after Premier Zhou Enlai learned of his situation, he instructed that Zhang be appointed as a member of the Central Research Institute of Culture and History. In 1980, the institute rehabilitated Zhang Boju, restoring his reputation.

== Collection ==
In early 1946, several scattered paintings and calligraphy works from the Forbidden City were discovered in Northeast China. Zhang Boju, then serving as a special member of the Palace Museum, proposed two suggestions: first, that all items listed as having been "gifted" by Puyi to Pujie, regardless of their authenticity, should be appraised and repurchased by the Palace Museum; second, that pieces identified as masterpieces after appraisal should also be purchased at a fair price.Zhang estimated that among the 1,198 works of calligraphy and painting, approximately 400 to 500 were valuable masterpieces. According to the prices at the time, it would not have required substantial funds to recover the majority of them. However, the director of the Palace Museum, Ma Heng, only verbally agreed to the proposal and failed to take any action. As a result, many renowned paintings and valuable artworks ended up in the hands of merchants and private collectors.

At that time, Ma Juchuan of the Yuchi Shanfang Studio in Liulichang was among the first to travel to Northeast China, followed by Jin Bosheng of the Lunwen Studio. Both men were highly skilled in authentication and demonstrated boldness in their pursuits. They acquired numerous rubbings, calligraphy, and paintings from the Northeast. Ma Juchuan sold counterfeit and mediocre works to the Palace Museum, reserving genuine masterpieces for sale to Shanghai merchants at exorbitant prices. Some of these items were even smuggled abroad through collusion with Shanghai traders. For instance, The Eight Meritorious Deeds by Chen Hong of the Tang dynasty and Lady Yang Mounting a Horse by Qian Xuan of the Yuan dynasty were both eventually lost overseas.Later, Ma Juchuan acquired Spring Outing by Zhan Ziqian, pricing it at 800 taels of gold. Upon learning of this, Zhang Boju immediately suggested to Ma Heng, the director of the Palace Museum, that the painting was a national treasure and should be acquired by the museum. Zhang even offered to assist with funding if the museum faced financial difficulties. However, Ma Heng did not take action. Left with no choice, Zhang personally negotiated with the merchant and ultimately purchased the painting for 220 taels of gold. At that time, Zhang had already acquired several significant works from the Song and Yuan dynasties, and his funds were severely strained. To secure Spring Outing, he had to sell his property to make the payment.Before this, Jin Bosheng had acquired Dao Fu Zan Scroll by Fan Zhongyan, which included a colophon by Wen Tong. When Zhang Daqian expressed interest in purchasing it, Ma Heng intervened and attempted to reclaim it for the Palace Museum, but Jin avoided him. Ultimately, Zhang Boju sold his property to acquire Dao Fu Zan Scroll.

In 1956, Zhang Boju and his wife, Pan Su (February 28, 1915 – April 16, 1992), donated several invaluable works of art to the state. These included Spring Outing by Zhan Ziqian from the Sui Dynasty, Ping Fu Tie by Lu Ji, Shangyangtai Tie by Li Bai, Gift to Zhang Haohao by Du Mu, Zhu Shangzuo Tie by Huang Tingjian, Lijia Shi by Wu Ju, Zishu Shi Tie by Cai Xiang, and Cursive Thousand-Character Classic by Zhao Mengfu. At the time, the Minister of Culture, Shen Yanbing, personally issued a certificate of commendation to honor their contributions.
