= Prime Minister of the Imperial Cabinet =

Position of the Qing Government

- 大清內閣總理大臣
- Flag of the Qing dynasty

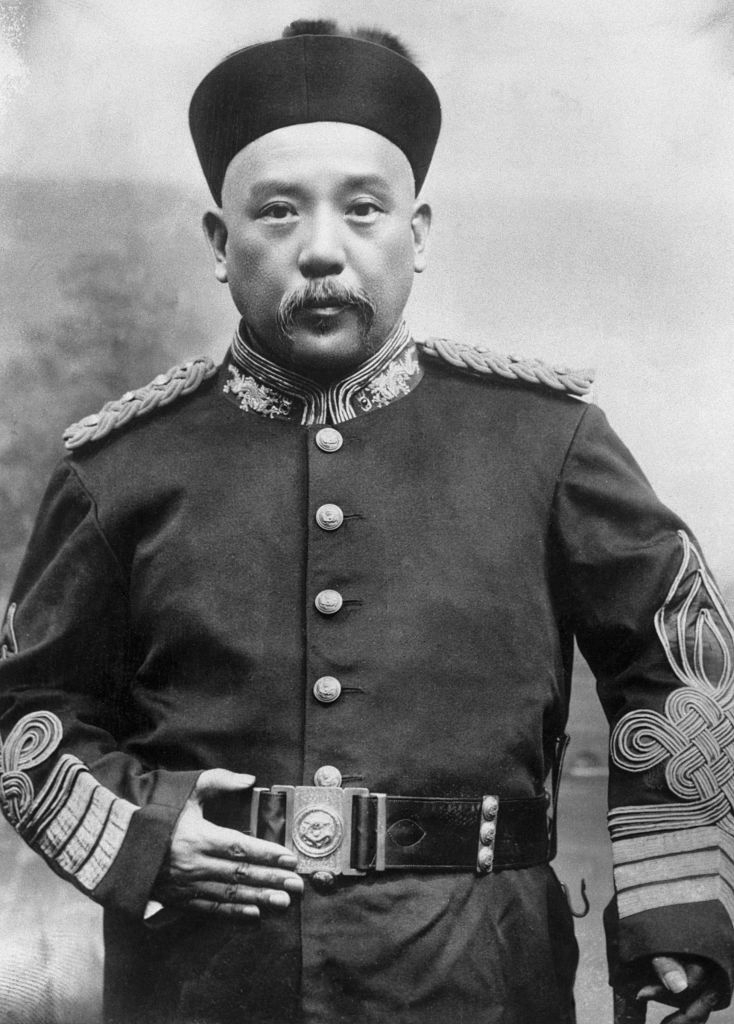
- Yuan Shikai; Last in office (nominally); 2 November 1911 — 10 March 1912
- Appointer: Emperor of China
- Inaugural holder: Prince Qing
- Formation: 8 May 1911; 115 years ago; 1 July 1917; 109 years ago (Manchu Restoration)
- Final holder: Yuan Shikai; Zhang Xun (Manchu Restoration)
- Abolished: 10 March 1912; 114 years ago; 12 July 1917; 109 years ago (Manchu Restoration)

Prime Minister of the Imperial Cabinet
- Traditional Chinese: 內閣總理大臣
- Simplified Chinese: 内阁总理大臣
Transcriptions
Standard Mandarin
- Hanyu Pinyin: Nèigé Zónglǐ Dàchén

The Prime Minister of the Imperial Cabinet was a position created on 8 May 1911 during the late Qing dynasty, as part of the imperial government's unsuccessful attempts at creating a constitutional monarchy in China.

== History ==
In the early 1900s, the Qing government began implementing constitutional reform in China in order to appease calls for reform and prevent a revolution. The reforms included the Principles of the Constitution passed in 1908, which ordered that elections for provincial assemblies must be held within a year. In May 1911, the government replaced the Grand Council with a thirteen-member cabinet, led by Prince Qing, who was appointed Prime Minister of the Imperial Cabinet. However, the cabinet included nine Manchus, seven of whom were members of the imperial clan. This "Princes' Cabinet" was unpopular among the people and was viewed as a reactionary measure, being described at one point as "the old Grand Council under the name of a cabinet, autocracy under the name of constitutionalism."

When the Wuchang Uprising broke out in November 1911, the imperial court summoned the general Yuan Shikai to command the Beiyang Army and put down the revolution. He was named prime minister on 2 November 1911, shortly after Prince Qing stepped down. He remained in that office until March 1912, when he negotiated with Empress Dowager Longyu the abdication of the Xuantong Emperor.

The post was briefly revived in July 1917 during Zhang Xun's attempt to restore the Qing monarchy, but he only held it for several days before Beijing was retaken by Republican forces.

== List of prime ministers ==
No.	Portrait	Name (Birth–Death)	Term of office			Political party	Cabinet	Emperor (Reign)	Ref.
No.	Portrait	Name (Birth–Death)	Took office	Left office	Time in office	Political party	Cabinet	Emperor (Reign)	Ref.
1		Yikuang, Prince Qing (1838–1917)	8 May 1911	1 November 1911	177 days	Independent (Imperial Family)	Yikuang	Xuantong (Puyi) (1908–1912)	
2		Yuan Shikai (1859–1916)	2 November 1911	10 March 1912	129 days	Beiyang Clique	Yuan	Xuantong (Puyi) (1908–1912)	
Abolished (1912–1917)
3		Zhang Xun (1854–1923)	1 July 1917	12 July 1917	11 days	Independent (Warlord)	Zhang	Puyi (unrecognized)	

== See also ==
- Chancellor of the Tang dynasty
- Grand chancellor (China)
- List of premiers of China
