= Shanxi Provincial Military Government =

Former Chinese government

- 1911–1912
- Flag
- Capital: Taiyuan
- Government: Military government
- Governor
  - 1911–1912: Yan Xishan
- History
  - Xinhai Revolution: October 10, 1911
  - Creation: October 29, 1911
  - Abolishment: April 4, 1912
Preceded by	Succeeded by
Qing Dynasty	Republic of China

The Shanxi Provincial Military Government was a government based in Taiyuan, established on October 29, 1911. The military government used the Bagua Taiji flag. On December 12, Niangziguan was occupied by the Qing army, and the military government withdrew from Taiyuan, which soon fell. On April 4, 1912. Yan Xishan was appointed Governor of Shanxi Province, and ended the Shanxi Provincial Military Government.
