= Chen Jintao =

Chinese financier and politician

- 陳錦濤
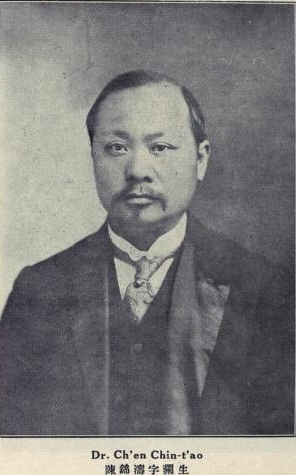
- Born: 1870; Nanhai, Guangdong, Qing dynasty
- Died: 1939 (aged 68–69)
- Education: Columbia University; Yale University
- Occupations: Banker; economist; professor
- Known for: Founder of Bank of China

Chen Jintao
- Chinese: 陈锦涛
Transcriptions
Standard Mandarin
- Hanyu Pinyin: Chén Jǐntāo
- Wade–Giles: Ch’en Chin-t’ao
Yue: Cantonese
- Jyutping: Can^{4} Gam^{2}tou^{4}

Chen Jintao (Chinese: 陳錦濤; pinyin: Chén Jǐntāo; Jyutping: Can^{4} Gam^{2}tou^{4}; 1870–1939) was a Chinese technocrat who founded the Bank of China. He was chief financial officer and head of currency reform in the Republic of China (1912–1949) and served as finance minister for warlords in Beijing, Nationalists in Nanjing, and the Nanjing Regime. Chen was responsible for innovations and improvements in printing and engraving, as well as for various currency reforms.

He graduated from Columbia University and Yale University and served as an economics professor of Tsinghua University. He is regarded as one of China's most skilled economists and bankers in the 20th century.

== Life ==
=== Early life and education ===
Chen was born in Nanhai in Guangdong Province in 1870, the son of a merchant from Hong Kong.

He graduated from Queens College in Hong Kong. He received a master's degree in math from Columbia University in 1902. He received a doctorate in political economy from Yale University in 1906.

When he returned to China, he received the highest score in an imperial exam for students returning from abroad. For this reason, he is sometimes referred to as China’s “first foreign scholar.”

=== Financial reforms and founding Bank of China ===
In 1908, Chen was appointed deputy director of the bureau of printing and engraving and sent on a mission overseas to investigate methods of postage stamp production. Chen concluded that American printing techniques were the best at preventing counterfeiting. He hired two American experts, William A. Grant and Lorenzo J. Hatch, to upgrade China’s postage stamp manufacturing.

When he returned to China, Chen was appointed head of a currency reform board. Following the 1911 Revolution, President Sun Yat-sen, who at this time headed a southern government based in Nanjing, named Chen minister of finance. Chen did not take up the post as he was abroad attending currency-related conferences. When he returned to China in September 1912, Chen was appointed the chief financial officer and head of the central audit office in Beijing.

In 1912, he also helped turn the Da-Qing Bank into the Bank of China.

In 1916, Chen was promoted to finance minister by Prime Minister Duan Qirui. When Duan was dismissed in May 1917, Chen was arrested for embezzlement. The Communications Clique was blamed for the arrest. Chen was exonerated in February 1918.

Chen returned to public service when Duan was restored as premier in November 1924. In 1926-1927, the Nationalists in the South advanced north and defeated the Beiyang government based in Beijing. In the spring of 1927, the Nationalists arrested Chen in Hangzhou and accused him of collusion with the leftist Wuhan government, a charge that was later dropped.

With the Nationalists in power, in 1929, Chen became professor of economics at Tsinghua University in Beijing. In the early 1930s, Chen briefly retired to Tianjin. In early 1935, he was appointed as an adviser on currency matters to H. H. Kung, the Nationalist finance minister.

=== World War 2 ===
In 1937, the Japanese occupied Nanjing, the Nationalist capital. While Kung and other officials fled to Chongqing, Chen remained at his post. In March 1938, he was appointed minister of finance in the collaborationist regime of Liang Hongzhi. The Liang regime had jurisdiction in the provinces of Jiangsu, Zhejiang, and Anhui. Chen retained this post until he died in June 1939.

== Contributions and reform ==
Before 1928, Chen was one of the few Chinese officials considered expert or competent by China’s foreign diplomats. He was responsible for significant improvements in printing and engraving, as well as founding the Bank of China. The currency reforms of the early Republican period may be credited to Chen.

He was a technocrat who diligently served China. He was apparently indifferent as to whether the government was imperialist, militarist, Nationalist, or collaborationist. Other than for the sake of running China's banks, his views and motives remain elusive.

== Publications ==
He is known for writing Junfu《均富》(meaning roughly 'Equal Wealth'), a treatise on capital and banking.
