= Zhang Xun =

Chinese general (1854–1923)

Prince Zhongyong of the First Rank Zhang Xun
- 張勳
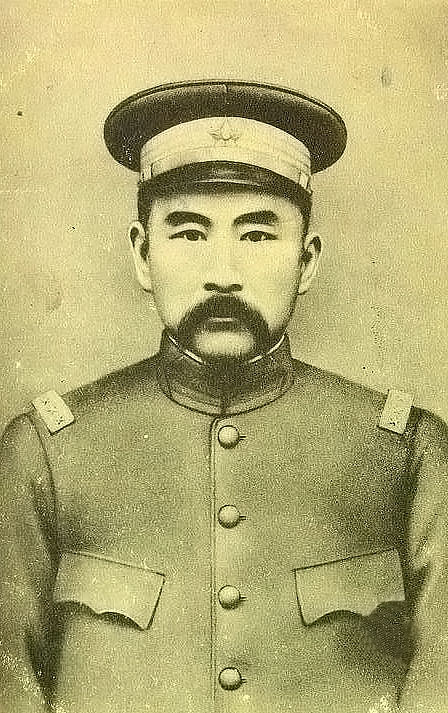

3rd Prime Minister of the Imperial Cabinet
- In office 1–12 July 1917
- Monarch: Xuantong Emperor
- Preceded by: Yuan Shikai (1912)
- Succeeded by: Position abolished

Personal details
- Born: 16 September 1854 Fengxin County, Yichun, Jiangxi, Qing Empire
- Died: 11 September 1923 (aged 68) Tianjin, Zhili, Republic of China
- Party: Royalist Party (Note: According to Madeleine Chi, Zhang was an "active member" of the Royalist Party, while Phil Billingsley only reports that "rumor had it" that Zhang was affiliated with the party.)
- Nickname: Queue General

Military service
- Allegiance: Qing dynasty Republic of China; Empire of China
- Branch/service: Beiyang Army
- Years of service: 1884–1917
- Rank: General officer Field marshal
- Battles/wars: Boxer Rebellion; Xinhai Revolution; Second Revolution; National Protection War; Manchu Restoration

Zhang Xun (Chinese: 張勳; pinyin: Zhāng Xūn; Wade–Giles: Chang^{1} Hsün^{1}; September 16, 1854 – September 11, 1923), courtesy name Shaoxuan (少軒), art name Songshou Laoren (松壽老人), nickname Bianshuai (辮帥, lit. 'marshal with queue'), was a Chinese general and Qing loyalist who attempted to restore the abdicated emperor Puyi in the Manchu Restoration of 1917. He also supported Yuan Shikai during his time as president.

== Biography ==
He was born on September 16, 1854, in Chitian village, Fengxin county, Jiangxi.

Zhang served as a military escort for Empress Dowager Cixi during the Boxer Uprising. He later served as a subordinate of General Yuan Shikai in the Beiyang Army. He fought for the Qing at Nanjing in 1911, and then after the fall of the Qing, he remained loyal to Yuan Shikai. Despite serving as a general in the new Republic, he refused to cut his queue, as a symbol of his loyalty to the Qing. He was called the "Queue General". He seized Nanjing from the KMT in 1913, defeating the Second Revolution. Despite allowing his troops to savagely loot the city, Zhang was named a field marshal by Yuan.

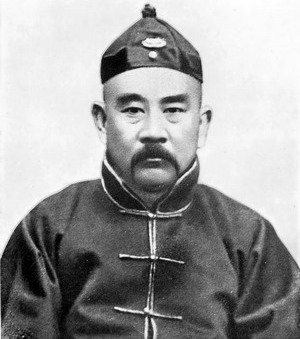
Zhang Xun as seen after his failed restoration

Between 1 July 1917 and 12 July 1917, Zhang Xun proclaimed himself Prime Minister of the Imperial Cabinet by entering Beijing to reinstate the deposed Puyi as Emperor of the Qing dynasty. However, Zhang Xun's proclamation in July 1917 was never recognized by the Government of the Chinese Republic, most of the Chinese people, or any foreign countries. Other generals loyal to the Republic subsequently thwarted Zhang and forced Puyi to abdicate again. Zhang then took refuge in the Dutch legation and never participated in politics again.

He died on September 11, 1923.

== See also ==
- Qing dynasty (Zhang Xun)

== Notes ==
Political offices
Preceded by Yuan Shikai (1912)	Prime Minister of the Imperial Cabinet; 1 July 1917 – 12 July 1917	Succeeded by Position abolished
