= Manchu Restoration =

Royalist attempt to restore the Qing dynasty, July 1917

- Part of the Warlord Era
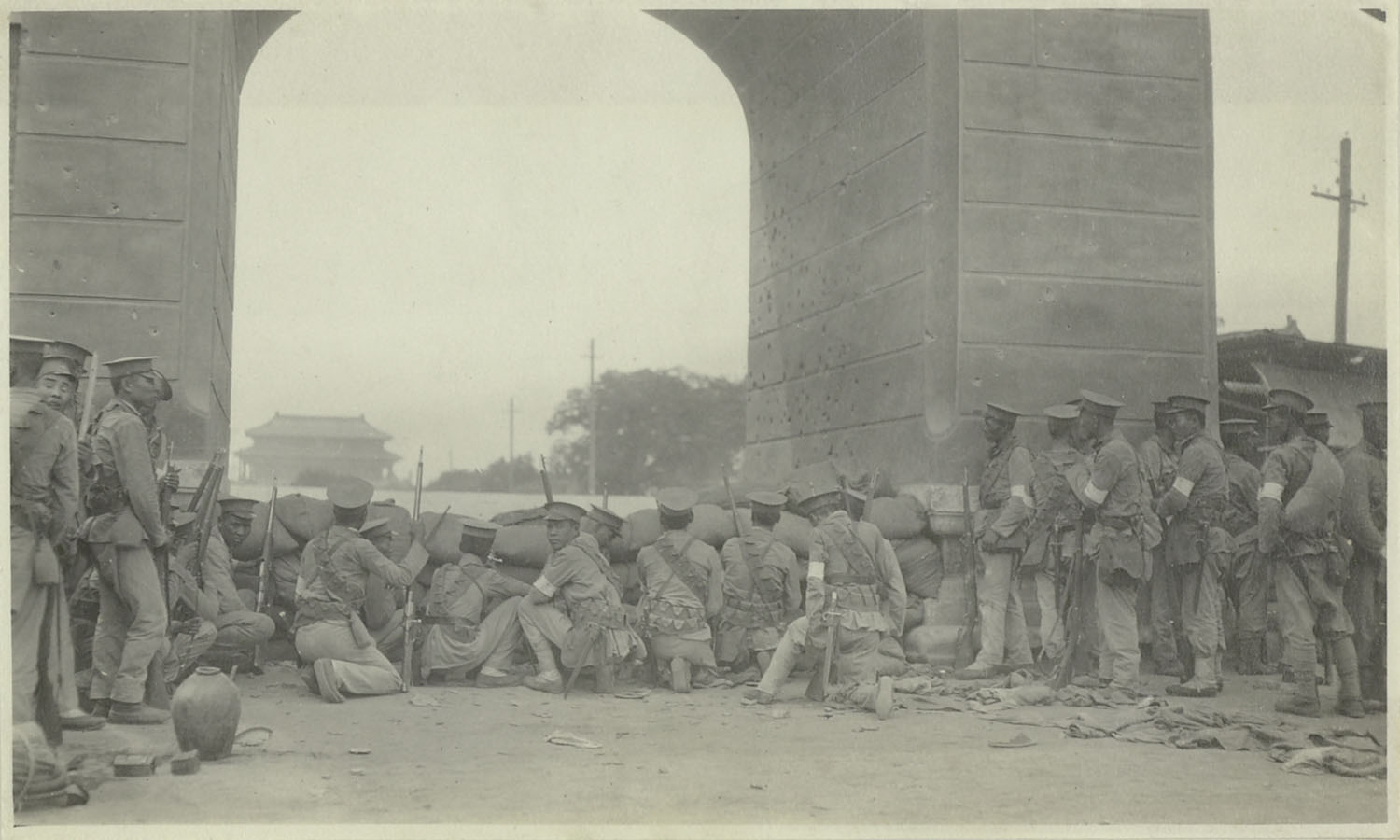
- Beiyang government "Anti-Rebel Army" (Tao Ni Jun) soldiers stationed at Dong'anmen in Beijing, July 12, 1917
Date	1–12 July 1917 (12 days)
Location	Beijing, China
Result	Failure of the restoration; Downfall of President Li Yuanhong

Belligerents
Great Qing: Dingwu Army; Royalist Party	(Republic of China (1912–1949)) Republic of China: Anhui clique; Zhili clique; Fengtian clique

Commanders and leaders
Puyi; (Qing dynasty) Zhang Xun; (Qing dynasty) Tieliang; (Qing dynasty) Kang Youwei; (Qing dynasty) Jiang Chaozong; (Qing dynasty) Wang Shizhen; (Qing dynasty) Zhu Jiabao; (Qing dynasty) Zaitao	(Republic of China (1912–1949)) Li Yuanhong; (Republic of China (1912–1949)) Duan Qirui; (Republic of China (1912–1949)) Liang Qichao; (Republic of China (1912–1949)) Jin Yunpeng; (Republic of China (1912–1949)) Feng Guozhang; (Republic of China (1912–1949)) Feng Yuxiang; (Republic of China (1912–1949)) Song Zheyuan; (Republic of China (1912–1949)) Zhang Zuolin

The Manchu Restoration or Dingsi Restoration (Chinese: 丁巳復辟), also known as Zhang Xun Restoration (simplified Chinese: 张勋复辟; traditional Chinese: 張勳復辟), or Xuantong Restoration (simplified Chinese: 宣统复辟; traditional Chinese: 宣統復辟), was an attempt to restore the Chinese monarchy by General Zhang Xun, whose army seized Beijing and briefly reinstalled the last emperor of the Qing dynasty, Puyi, to the throne. The restoration lasted just less than two weeks, from July 1 to July 12, 1917, and was quickly reversed by Republican troops. Despite the uprising's popular name ("Manchu Restoration"), almost all putschists were ethnic Han.

== Background ==
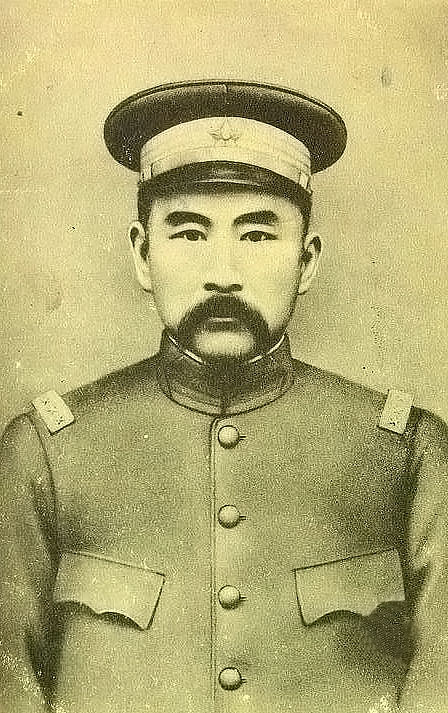
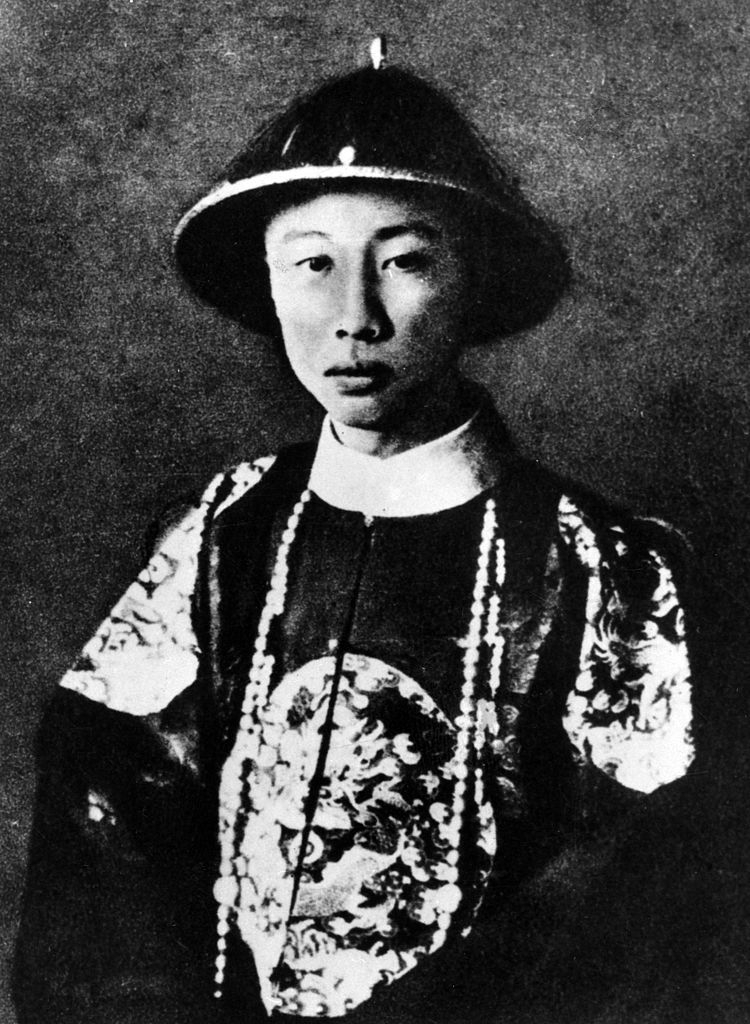
Royalist warlord Zhang Xun (left) tried to restore the last Qing emperor Puyi (right) to the Chinese throne in Beijing.

Although the Qing dynasty was overthrown in 1912, following the 1911 Revolution, many people in China wished for its restoration. Ethnic Manchus and Mongols believed that they were discriminated against by China's new Republican government, and restorationism consequently became popular among these ethnic groups. The Qing also enjoyed support among sections of the Han Chinese population as well, such as in Northeastern China. Many were disappointed about the Republican government's inability to solve China's problems. Finally, there were numerous reactionaries and disempowered ex-Qing officials who conspired to overthrow the Republic. As a result, pro-Qing restorationist groups, most notably the Royalist Party, remained an underrepresented, but powerful factor in Chinese politics during the 1910s. Several royalist uprisings were launched, but all failed.

The confrontation between President Li Yuanhong and Premier Duan Qirui about whether to join the Allied Powers in World War I and declare war on Germany led to political unrest in the capital Beijing in the spring of 1917.

The military governors left Beijing after Duan Qirui's dismissal as Premier. They gathered in Tianjin, calling on the troops from the provinces to rebel against Li and take the capital, despite the opposition of the navy and the southern provinces. In response, on June 7, 1917, Li requested that General Zhang Xun mediate the situation. General Zhang demanded that parliament be dissolved, which Li considered unconstitutional.

== Restoration ==
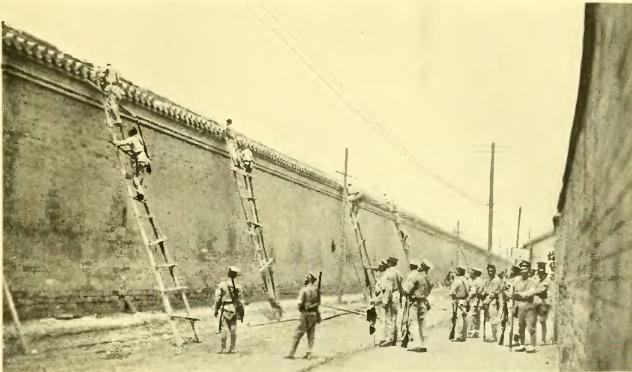
Republican troops scaling the wall of the Forbidden City.

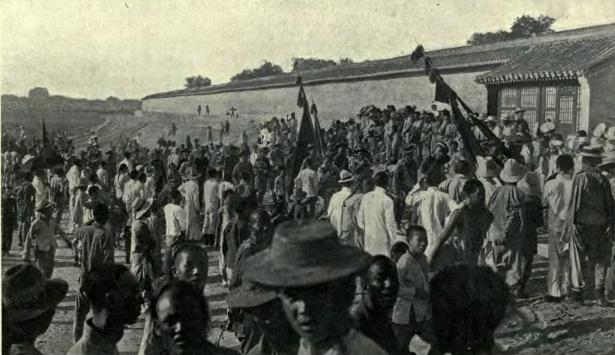
Monarchist supporters and spectators gather at the Temple of Heaven in Beijing during Zhang Xun's attempted restoration of the Qing dynasty.

On the morning of July 1, 1917, the royalist general Zhang Xun took advantage of the unrest and entered the capital, proclaiming the restoration of Puyi as Emperor of China at 4 am with a small entourage and reviving the Qing monarchy which had been abolished on February 12, 1912. The capital police soon submitted to the new government. General Xu later published an edict of restoration that falsified the approval of the president of the republic, Li Yuanhong. He was also supported by several other officials, including Beiyang General Jiang Chaozong, former Qing war minister Wang Shizhen, civil affairs minister Zhu Jiabao, and diplomat Xie Jieshi.

Over the next 48 hours, edicts were proclaimed in an attempt to bolster the restoration, to the astonishment of the general public. On July 3, Li fled the presidential palace with two of his aides and took refuge in the embassy district, first in the French legation and later in the Japanese embassy.

Before taking refuge in the Japanese embassy, Li had taken certain measures, including leaving the presidential seal in the Presidential Palace, appointing Vice President Feng Guozhang as Acting President, and restoring Duan Qirui as Premier, in an attempt to enlist them in the defense of the republic.

Duan immediately took command of the republican troops stationed in nearby Tianjin. On July 5, 1917, his troops seized the Beijing–Tianjin railway 40 kilometers from the capital. On the same day, General Zhang left the capital to meet the republicans, his forces further bolstered by Manchu reinforcements. Zhang was faced with overwhelming odds; almost all of the Northern Army was opposed to him and he was forced to withdraw after republican troops seized control of the two main railway lines to the capital. Duan Qirui ordered an aerial bombardment of the Forbidden City compound, and a Caudron Type D aircraft, piloted by Pan Shizhong (潘世忠) with bombardier Du Yuyuan (杜裕源) was dispatched from Nanyuan Airbase to drop three bombs over the Forbidden City, causing the death of a eunuch, but otherwise causing minor damage; other sources state that the Caudron aircraft was piloted by the principal of the Nanyuan Aviation School, Qin Guoyong (秦國鏞). This was the first recorded instance of aerial bombardment deployed by the early-republican era Chinese Air Force.

On the ninth day of the Restoration, General Zhang resigned from his appointed positions, retaining only the command of his troops in the capital, which were surrounded by republican forces. The restored imperial court prepared an edict of abdication for Puyi, but fearful of Zhang's royalist forces, did not dare proclaim it. The imperial court began secret negotiations with republican forces to prevent an assault on the city, even asking the foreign legations to mediate between the parties. The uncertainty over the imperial court's own fate and that of General Zhang caused negotiations to fall apart. The republican generals announced a general assault on the positions of the monarchists on the morning of July 12.

The attack began the next day, with royalists troops entrenched on the wall of the Temple of Heaven. Shortly after the fighting began, negotiations resumed, resulting in the royalists giving up their positions. General Zhang, dismayed, fled to the legations quarter. Once General Zhang had fled, the royalist troops called for a ceasefire, which was immediately granted.

== Aftermath ==
The military failure of the royalist troops left the Qing court and imperial family in a precarious position with the republican government suspicious of the Qing remnants.

President Li refused to return to his post, leaving it in Feng Guozhang's hands. Li's departure from the republican leadership allowed Duan to take charge of the government; and on August 14, 1917, a month after the recapture of the capital, China declared war on Germany as Duan had originally wished, without opposition from Li.

Li's withdrawal strengthened military cliques in northern China and left the already fractured central government in the hands of the Feng Zhili-Anhui clique, which Duan dominated. As the central government weakened, China fragmented further, foreshadowing the era of warlords and, in the South, increasing the popularity and strength of Sun Yat-sen's rival government.

== See also ==
- Monarchy of the North
