= Three Alls policy =

Japanese scorched earth policy in World War II

Three Alls Policy
- Part of the Second Sino-Japanese War of World War II
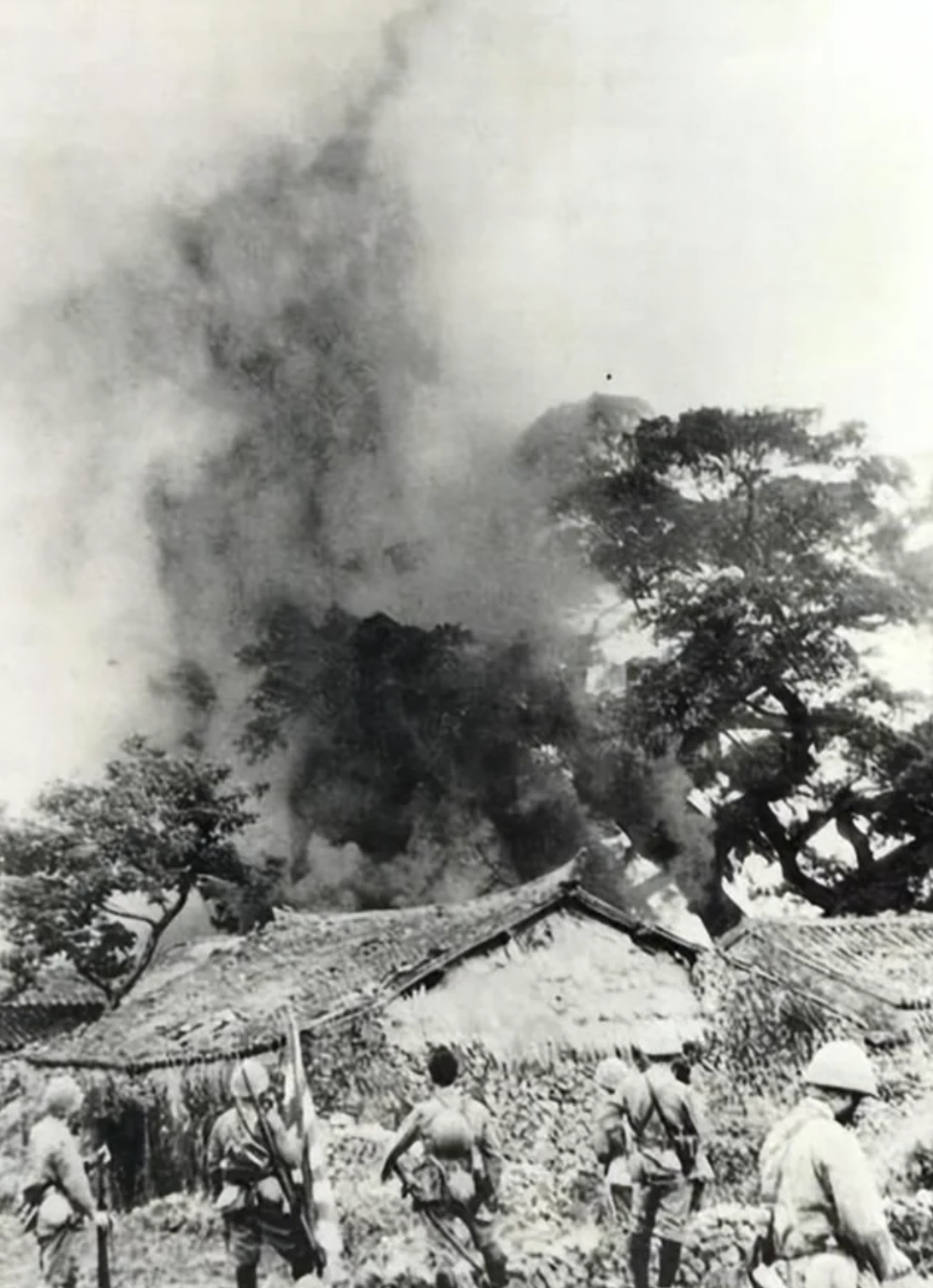
- A photo of Japanese forces burning down a village in China.
- Location: North China and Central China: Shandong, Hebei, Shanxi, Chahar, Henan
- Date: Spring 1941 to 1942, pacification campaigns had already begun in January 1940 and persisted until March 1945
- Attack type: Mass murder, forced starvation, genocide (debated), (Note: According to Gavan McCormack, the North China pacification campaigns merit consideration under the criteria of genocide due to their exterminatory nature. Sarah Paine characterizes the Three Alls Policy as a "war of annihilation" due to its indiscriminate nature and enormous civilian body count. According to Bob Wakabayashi, the Three Alls Policy could qualify as a genocide if the targets were defined as Chinese people residing in contested areas, but counters with an argument that those Chinese would not have been killed if they had not resisted.) looting, forced labour and slavery, arson, wartime rape, state terrorism, collective punishment
- Deaths: 2,000,000—3,180,000 (Note: Total number of civilians massacred by Japanese forces in Communist guerilla base areas in North China during the eight-year war) civilians killed, likely more (Note: Chinese records reported a population drop of 19,000,000 in the affected areas. It is unknown what proportions of this number were displaced, deported, or murdered.)
- Victim: 0.7–2.76 million civilians enslaved (Note: From Communist guerilla base areas in North China during the eight-year war)
- Perpetrators: Japanese North China Area Army: General Yasuji Okamura; Major General Ryūkichi Tanaka

The Three Alls policy (Japanese: 三光作戦, Hepburn: Sankō Sakusen; Chinese: 三光政策; pinyin: Sānguāng Zhèngcè) was the Japanese scorched-earth policy (Japanese: 燼滅作戦, Hepburn: Jinmetsu Sakusen) adopted in China during World War II, the three "alls" being "kill all, burn all, loot all". This policy was designed as retaliation against the Chinese for the Communist-led Hundred Regiments Offensive in December 1940.

The policy targeted suspected guerrilla base areas and used extreme measures to eliminate their inhabitants in order to transform them into "unpopulated zones" (mujin chiku, or a "no-man's-land").

Japanese tactics included indiscriminate massacres, destroying entire villages, forced starvation, and the widespread deployment of chemical weapons against rural populations. Japanese forces also targeted young men to deny Communist forces potential recruits; those not killed immediately were conscripted into forced labour units. In addition, Japanese troops stripped the countryside of their food stores and razed crop fields, deliberately engineering food shortages to starve the civilian population into submission.

Japanese troops had already launched violent pacification measures since 1938 in Hebei, and Major General Ryūkichi Tanaka had formalized the campaigns in 1940. General Yasuji Okamura escalated these anti-partisan drives following the Hundred Regiments Offensive, with his forces doubling in size and conducting five pacification campaigns between 1941 and 1942 in Shandong, Hebei, Shanxi, Henan and Charhar. Pacification drives continued well into March of 1945, but they ultimately failed in securing North China.

The Three Alls Policy killed millions of Chinese civilians. Chinese Communists recorded that the populations of their base areas dropped from 44,000,000 to 25,000,000. Some historians have characterized the Japanese campaigns as genocidal in their scale and intent.

== Background ==
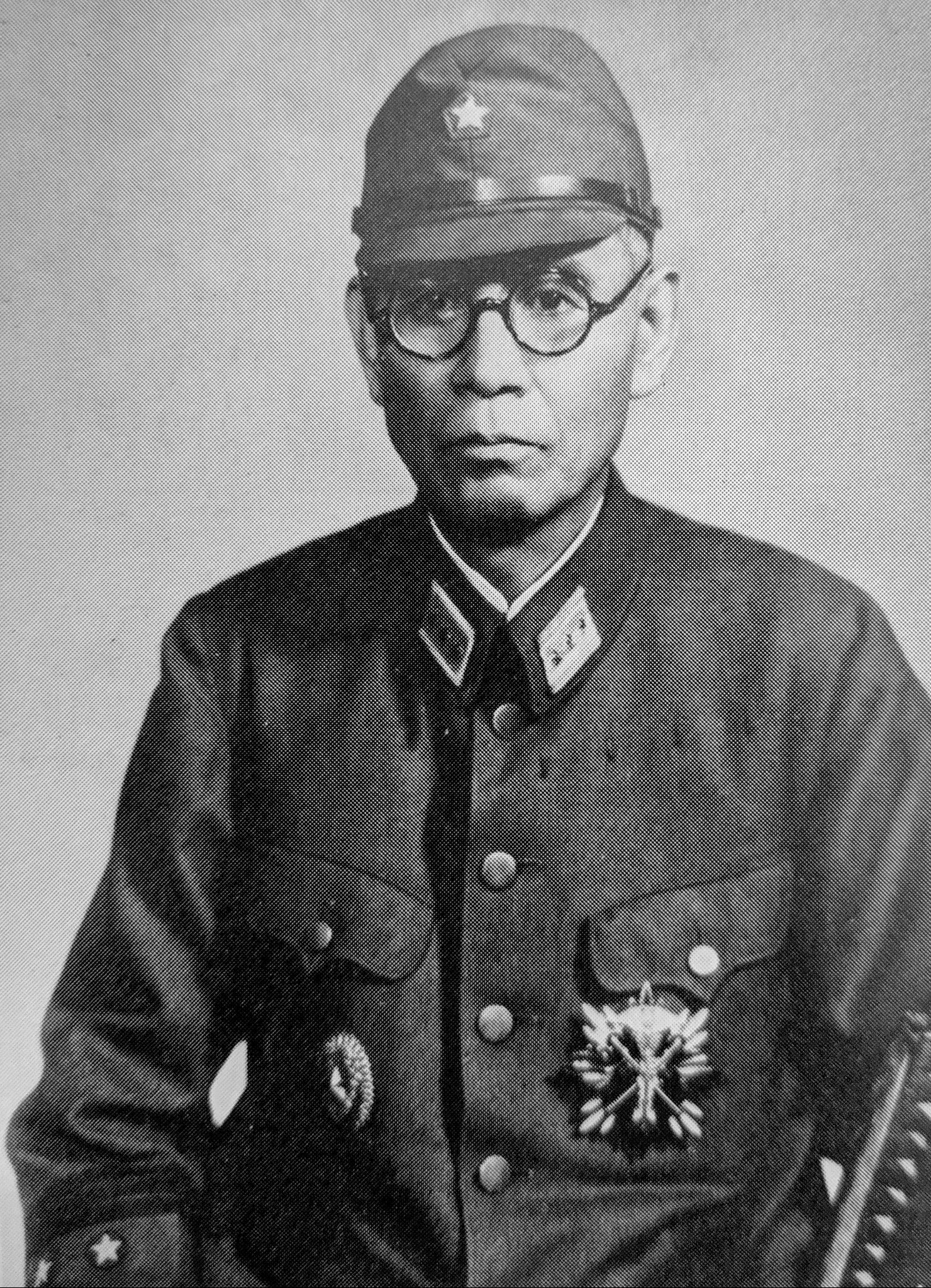
General Yasuji Okamura, one of the main perpetrators of the Three Alls Policy.

Japanese forces had already committed numerous atrocities in North China since their occupation of Manchuria, with one notable example being the 3,000 victims of the Pingdingshan massacre, where Japanese soldiers had machine-gunned civilians and razed the village to the ground, all on the suspicion that the town had been harboring resistance fighters.

=== Prior campaigns ===
The prototype of the Sankō Sakusen policies were the "annihilation campaigns" launched in late 1938 by the North China Area Army (NCAA) to stamp out the vigorous guerrilla resistance in Hebei province. Emperor Hirohito personally gave his approval in an order dated 2 December 1938.

Major General Ryūkichi Tanaka had also initiated formal annihilation campaigns in 1940. These campaigns entailed devastating villages and massacring their populations.

In Shanxi Province, from September to December of 1940, Japanese forces targeted and destroyed villages in "mopping-up" campaigns. They killed wounded guerrillas sheltering in towns, slaughtered herds of livestock and burned massive stockpiles of grain. They razed thousands of houses and massacred inhabitants with machine guns and grenades.

In one example, the Japanese killed 5,000 villagers in Qinyuan County in a two-week "mopping operation" in late October 1940. In one village, they sealed 129 inhabitants of Hanhong town into the village temple and burned them alive. In another, they raped 97 villagers before murdering them.

Since the Imperial Japanese Army always viewed the National Revolutionary Army and other Kuomintang-aligned forces as their main enemies in China, they tended to ignore the Chinese Communist forces. By mid-1940, the Communists controlled vast tracts of the Chinese countryside, ruling tens of millions of people.

=== Hundred Regiments Offensive ===
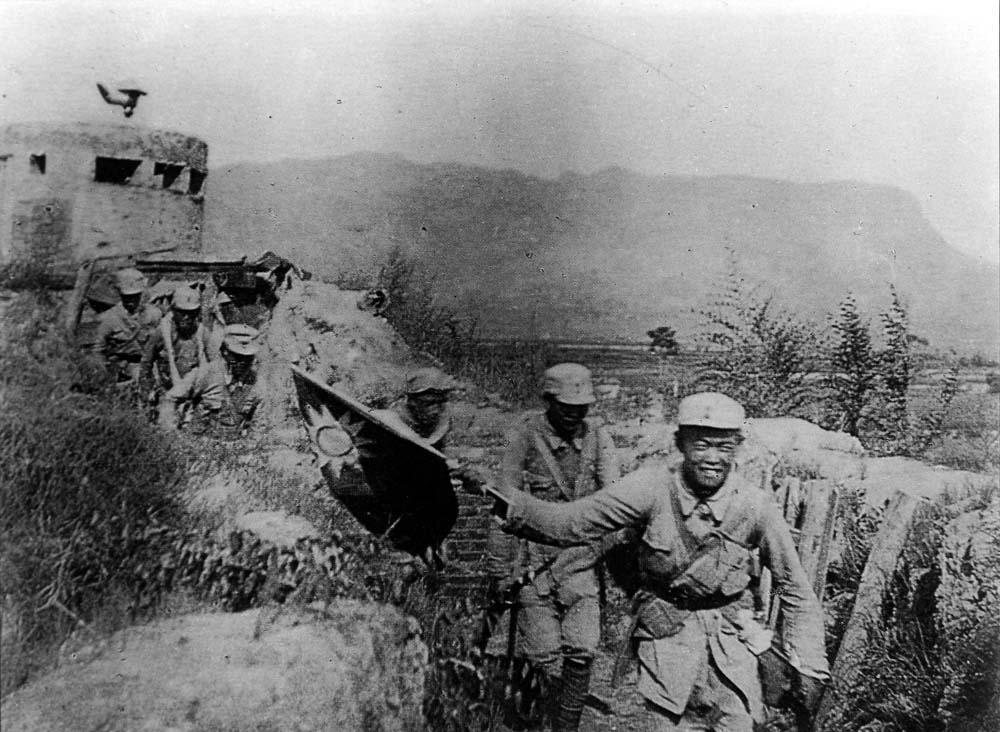
Chinese Communist soldiers, one brandishing a Republic of China banner, storm a Japanese position during the Hundred Regiments Offensive, 1940.

In August 1940, the Communist Eighth Route Army (created from the Chinese Red Army) launched the "Hundred Regiments Campaign", a large guerrilla offensive targeting bridges, railroads, mines, blockade houses and telephone lines in northern China that caused extensive damage. The scale of the campaign surprised Japanese commanders, as the Communists had rarely pursued formal military campaigns.

In retaliation for the "100 Regiments" offensive, General Ryūkichi Tanaka, commanding North China Area Army devised a plan for the "total annihilation" of the Communist base areas so that "the enemy could never use them again."

== Implementation in China (1941-1945) ==
=== Japanese strategy ===
The Three Alls Policy, titled Jinmetsu Soto Sakusen amongst Japanese command, was implemented in full scale in the spring of 1941. General Yasuji Okamura, who assumed command in the summer, divided the five provinces within North China and Central China (Hebei, Shandong, Shaanxi, Shanxi, Chahar) into "pacified", "semi-pacified" and "unpacified" areas.

The Japanese army also sought to concentrate the region's population into militarized encampments, whilst transforming the open countryside into “unpopulated zones" (mujin chiku). Gavan McCormack wrote that these measures merit consideration as genocide. Journalist Iris Chang, author of The Rape of Nanking, described the measures implemented as a "massive terrorist campaign".

=== 1941 ===
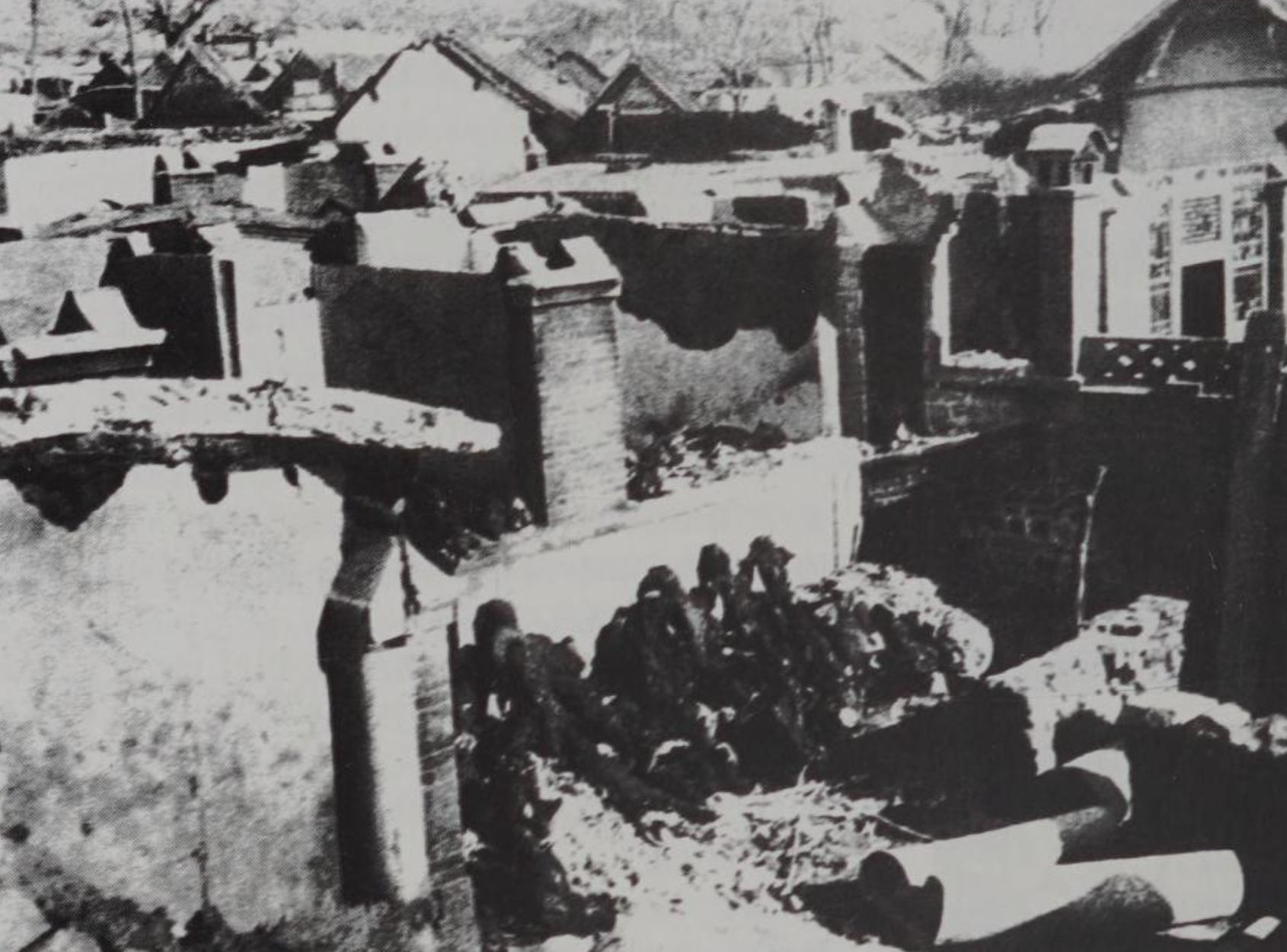
The aftermath of a massacre in Panjiayu village, where 1,300 villagers were burned alive or gunned down by Japanese forces.

Starting in 1941, the Japanese North China Army launched an "annihilation war" in Shanxi and Hebei Provinces. Japanese units massacred civilians, razed villages, and plundered food reserves. One Japanese colonel recorded in his diary that "around here, even these China women join the war", and that his orders were " that every person in this place must be killed".

Japanese troops used public displays of violence to terrorize local civilians. In one instance on April 27, Japanese troops in Hebei gathered 16 civilians suspected of assisting the Eighth Route Army and publicly tortured them to death.

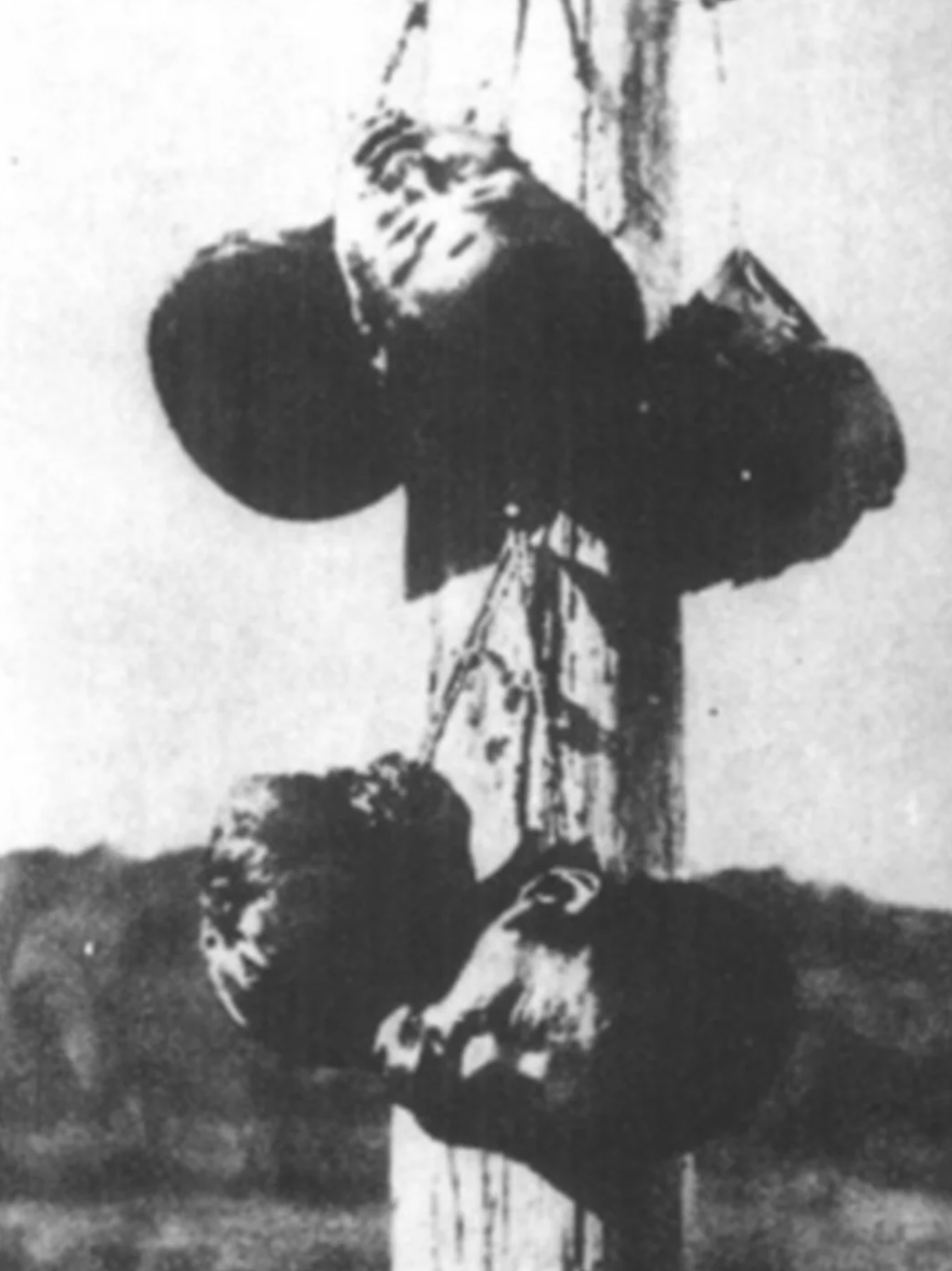
The severed heads of five alleged Chinese resistance fighters hung from a utility pole by Japanese soldiers, meant to terrorize local civilians. Occupied Manchuria.

Japanese forces also targeted the families of suspected guerrilla fighters. On May 4, 1941, having learned that the families of several Communist guerrillas lived in Liangou Village, Japanese troops massacred 80 women, children, and elderly civilians in a reprisal raid.

On July 7 1941, General Yasuji Okamura was appointed as the North China Area Army's new commander. On July 9, Okamura's predecessor and then acting commander Lieutenant-General Hayao Tada issued the "Jin-Cha-Ji Border Region Pacification Plan"—a policy of wearing down and crushing Communist forces in the Jin-Cha-Ji Border Region through the destruction of their bases, seizure of resources, and breaking their self-sufficiency—which historian Eguchi Keiichi described as a Three Alls Operation. Okamura's strategies involved burning down villages, confiscating grain, and forcibly mobilizing peasants to construct collective hamlets. It also centered on the digging of vast trench lines and the building of thousands of miles of containment walls and moats, watchtowers and roads to prevent guerrillas from moving around. The Three Alls Policy targeted for destruction "enemies pretending to be local people" and "all males between the ages of fifteen and sixty whom we suspect to be enemies." Consequently, Japanese soldiers routinely targeted and massacred young men in their raids, conscripting those who were not killed into forced labour units.

From August 1941, the North China Army would identify regions to become a "no-man's-land", usually along railways or around mountains. They would then depopulate them through massacres or deportations. In one example, Japanese forces designated a region around Mount Wutai as a "no-man's-land", and drowned 342 villagers in a local river. In another, Japanese units massacred 1,411 villagers around Mount Lushan in Pingshan, Hubei.

These raids inflicted massive damage and property losses amongst the targeted civilian populations. In two districts alone (Pingxi and Beiyue), Japanese forces abducted 20,000 young men and conscripted them as slaves, looted 80,000 heads of livestock and chickens, and plundered or destroyed 30,000 tons of grain.

Imperial General Headquarters Order Number 575 authorized an escalation of the policy on 3 December 1941.

=== 1942 ===
Following the attack on Pearl Harbor, the Japanese military began redeploying troops and resources from the North China Army for the broader war. However, the North China Army only intensified its "mopping-up operations" against regional Communist guerrillas. 1942 marked the greatest intensity of the Three Alls Policy and its campaigns.

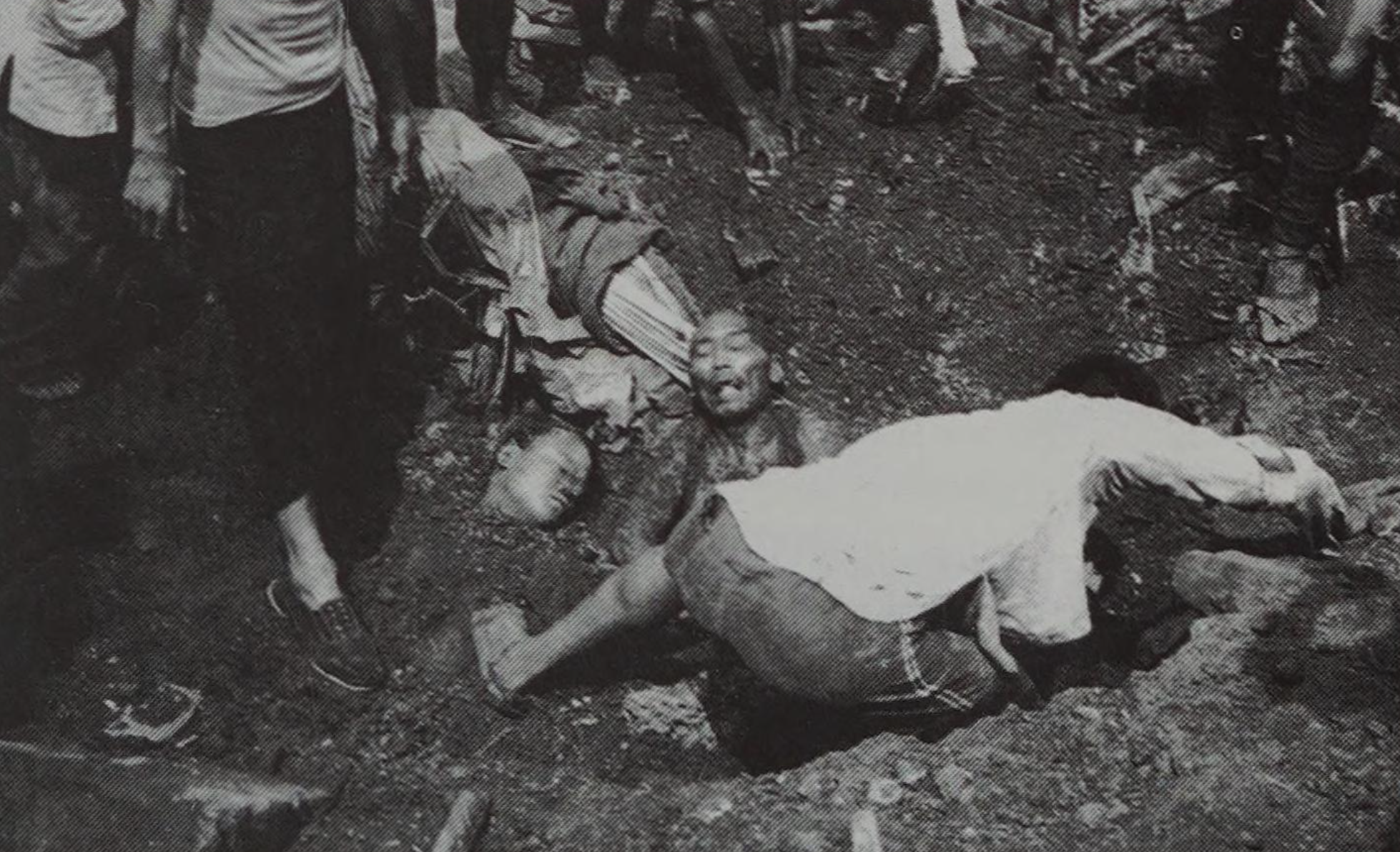
Chinese victims who were buried alive by Japanese forces.

Having suffered losses from the campaign, the Chinese Eighth Route Army retreated to the southwest of Hebei Province. In their pursuit of the Communist guerrillas, Japanese forces killed thousands of civilians in multiple villages, in one instance dumping their corpses into the local wells.

Starting in May 1942, General Okamura deployed three divisions and two mixed brigades, some 50,000 men, in a large "mopping-up operation" in central Hebei. These troops killed tens of thousands of civilians, whilst deporting many more to Manchuria for slave labor. In one massacre, Japanese troops of the 110th Division killed over 1,000 civilians in the Beitong Village with chemical weapons.

On June 14, 1942, Japanese troops massacred 167 civilians in Yebei Village, Hebei, and threw 9 children and infants to their deaths from high heights.

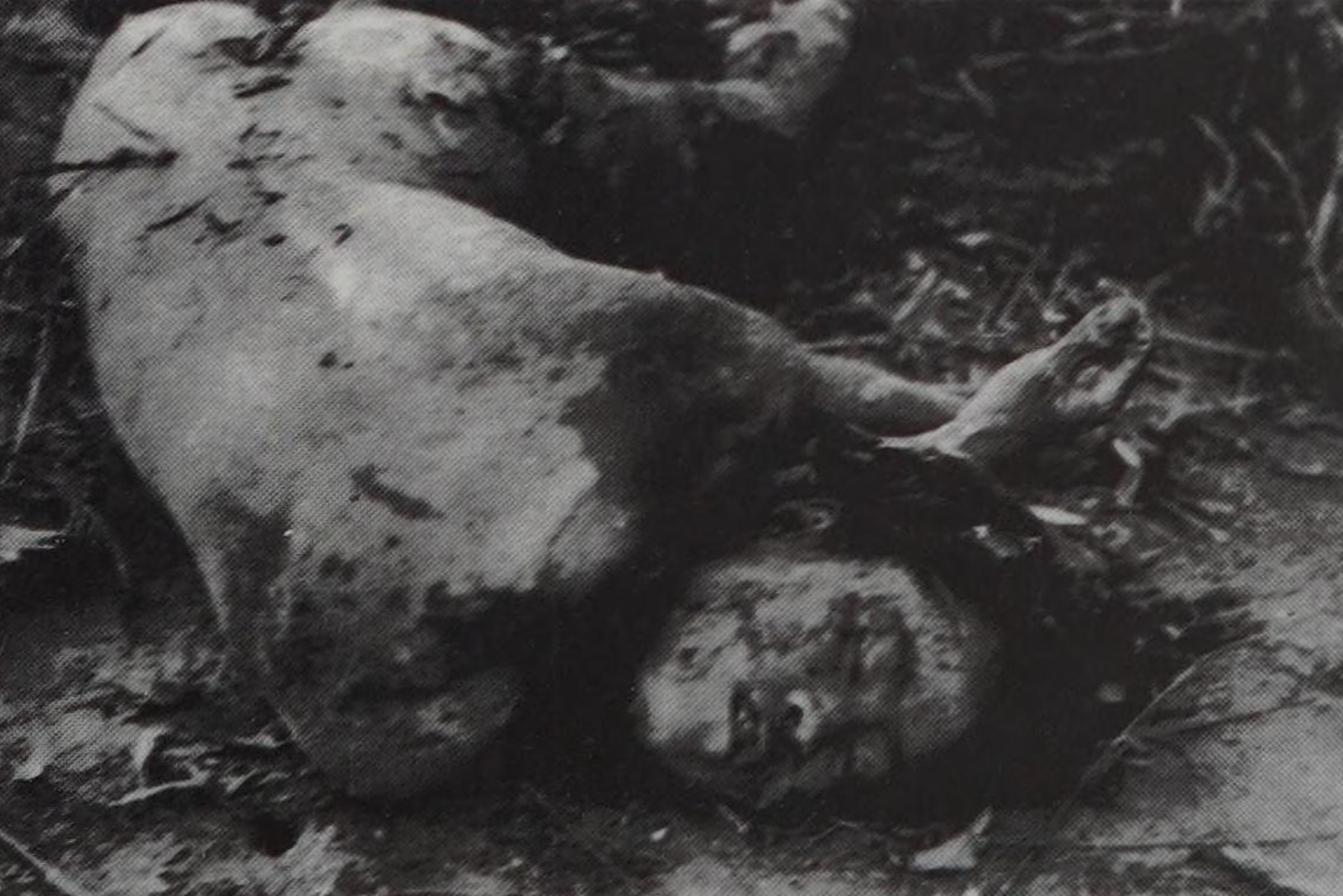
The body of 22 year old Lu Yaomei, who was killed by Japanese forces during a "sweep campaign". The flesh of her left leg was cut off by Japanese soldiers to make dumpling filling. 1943.

The Japanese also demolished river dikes to instigate flooding. In July 1942, Japanese troops destroyed 128 dikes, causing flooding in every county of Hebei Province. The flooding impacted 6,752 villages, destroyed 400 square miles of farmland, and displaced 2,000,000 civilians.

Deported Chinese civilians were concentrated into "protected areas" where they were enslaved to build forts and pillboxes. Japanese soldiers also routinely sent photographs of beheadings and bayonetings back home to their families, and also recorded their atrocities in letters and diaries.

=== 1943—1945 ===
Japanese scorched earth campaigns continued into 1943 and 1944, with continuous raids designed to sabotage harvests, loot supplies, and deprive the Chinese Communist forces of their resources.

These measures included using public displays of torture and large atrocities. For example, villagers would be forced to stand naked in the snow until they died, or men would be forced to watch their female relatives be raped and murdered. In another example on November 1943, Japanese forces executed several hundred Chinese villagers near Heishuiping by shooting them, burying them alive, dismembering them, crushing them to death, beheading them, feeding them to wolves and dogs, throwing them off cliffs, and gassing them.

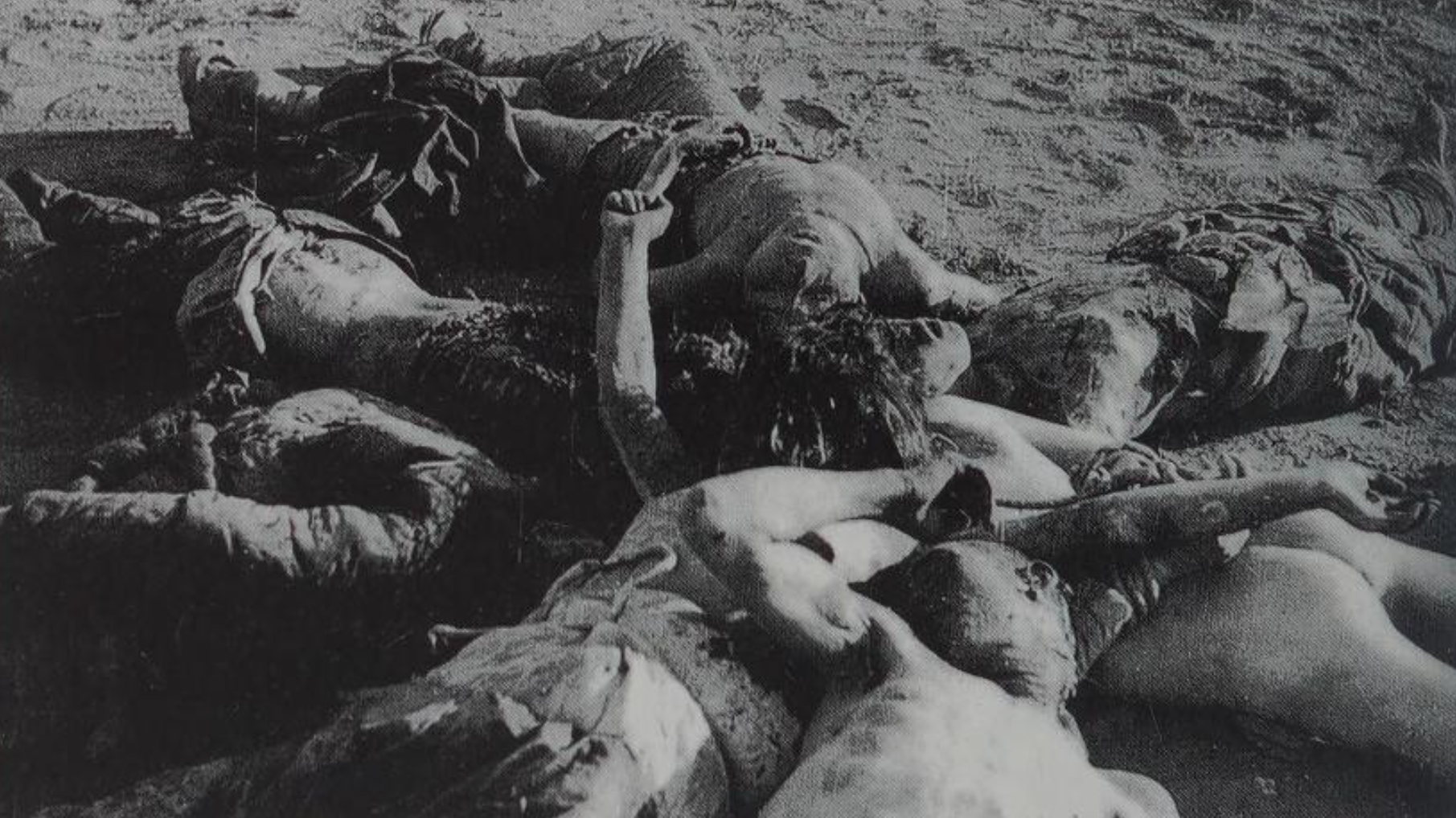
Victims of a Japanese massacre that killed 1,000 civilians. Hebei, 1943.

However, due to the increasing demands of the Pacific War and reversal of Japanese gains, these campaigns gradually diminished in intensity and scale. These measures would continue until March of 1945, when North and Central China would still remained unpacified by the Japanese occupation.

=== Sexual violence ===
Young Chinese women were also forcibly conscripted, many of whom faced sexual violence by their Japanese captors. One, fourteen-year-old Deng Yumin from Baoding, was "chosen for special work" by a forty-year-old Japanese officer, who then "raped [her] every day".

In southern Shanxi and northwest Hubei, Japanese forces raped and tortured local farmers and villagers, whilst deporting the survivors to Manchuria. They left corpses unburied and used swords to kill victims.

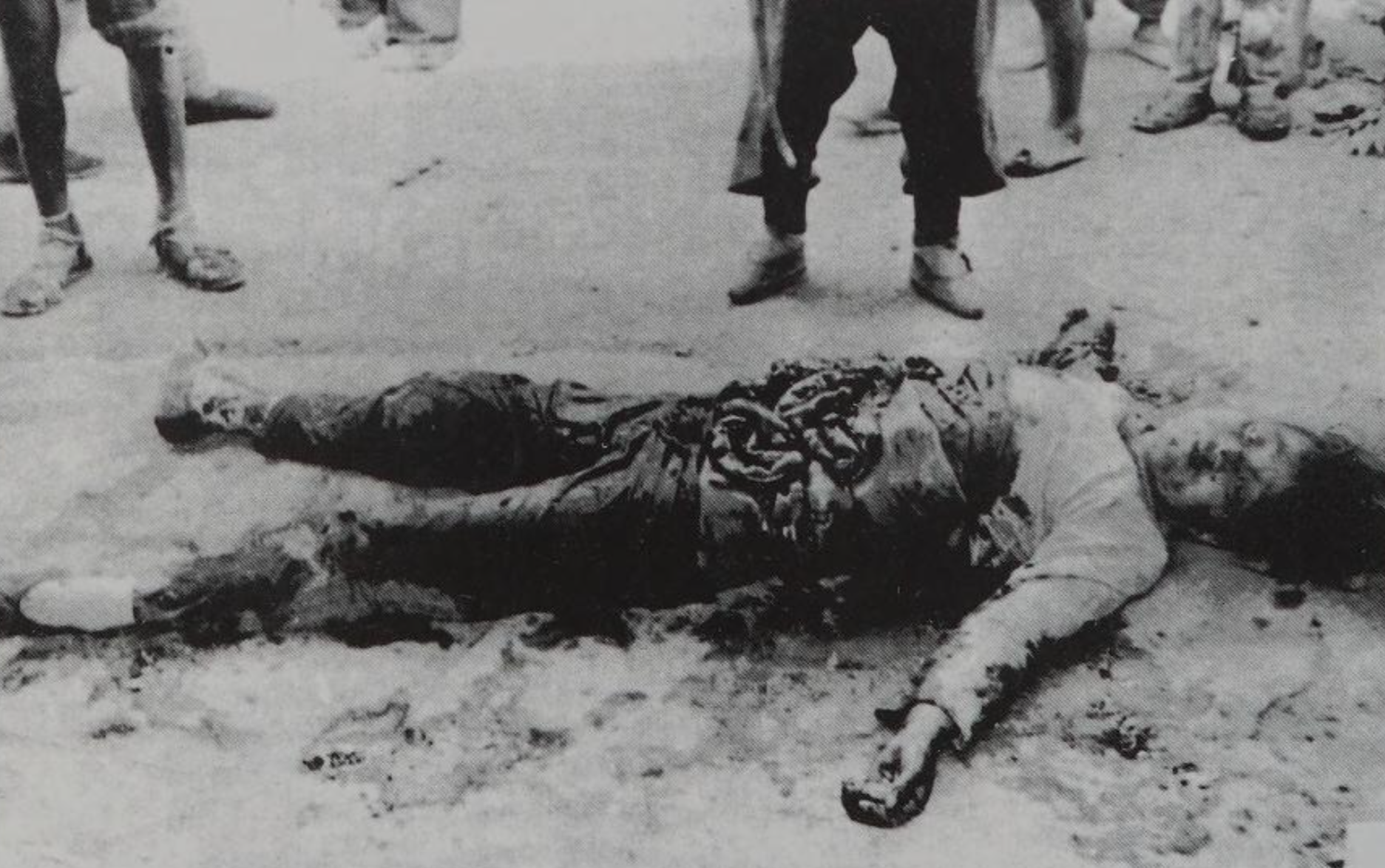
A woman who was raped and disemboweled with a bayonet by Japanese soldiers in the Langya Mountain Area. September 23, 1941, Hebei Province.

In one case on Hainan Island in December 1943, where Japanese forces had implemented similar destructive measures, they forced ten young women and teenagers to the edge of their village and gangraped them. They stabbed a 14-year-old in the genitals until she died, cut the breasts off a 15-year-old, and cut open the stomach of a pregnant woman and ripped out the fetus.

=== Use of chemical weapons and starvation ===
NCAA forces also weaponized starvation against civilian populations. Japanese forces looted rural grain stores and burned whatever harvests they could not confiscate. They slaughtered livestock and destroyed village wells. Japanese troops also demolished river dikes to instigate flooding and destroy agricultural systems. These measures created widespread food shortages and civilian suffering.

Between 1937 and 1945, the seven Communist base regions affected by the Three Alls Policy lost 76,000,000 tons of grain and 55,000,000 heads of livestock, pigs, and sheep. Another 19,520,000 homes were burned down.

Japanese forces also deployed chemical weapons against rural villages and instituted a cycle of raiding the same area multiple times, to ensure no resistance sprang up from the local population.

For example, in May 1942, Japanese forces used chemical weapons on the village of Beitong in a massacre that killed 1,000 civilians. In it, 500 men of the Japanese 110th Division "swept" Beitong, where local villagers had dug and hid in underground tunnels to avoid Japanese army operations. Japanese forces filled the tunnels with chemical weapons, tear gas, and smoke. Hundreds of villagers were gassed to death or asphyxiated, and those that escaped were gunned down or stabbed to death, including children as young as 10. Japanese troops raped women who had fled and then killed them. The village houses were burned down and the food looted.

== Death toll ==
Historian Sarah Paine characterizes the Three Alls Policy as a "war of annihilation" in its scope and devastation. Rummel states that the Three Alls Policy was "the worst" of all Japanese atrocities committed in mainland China.

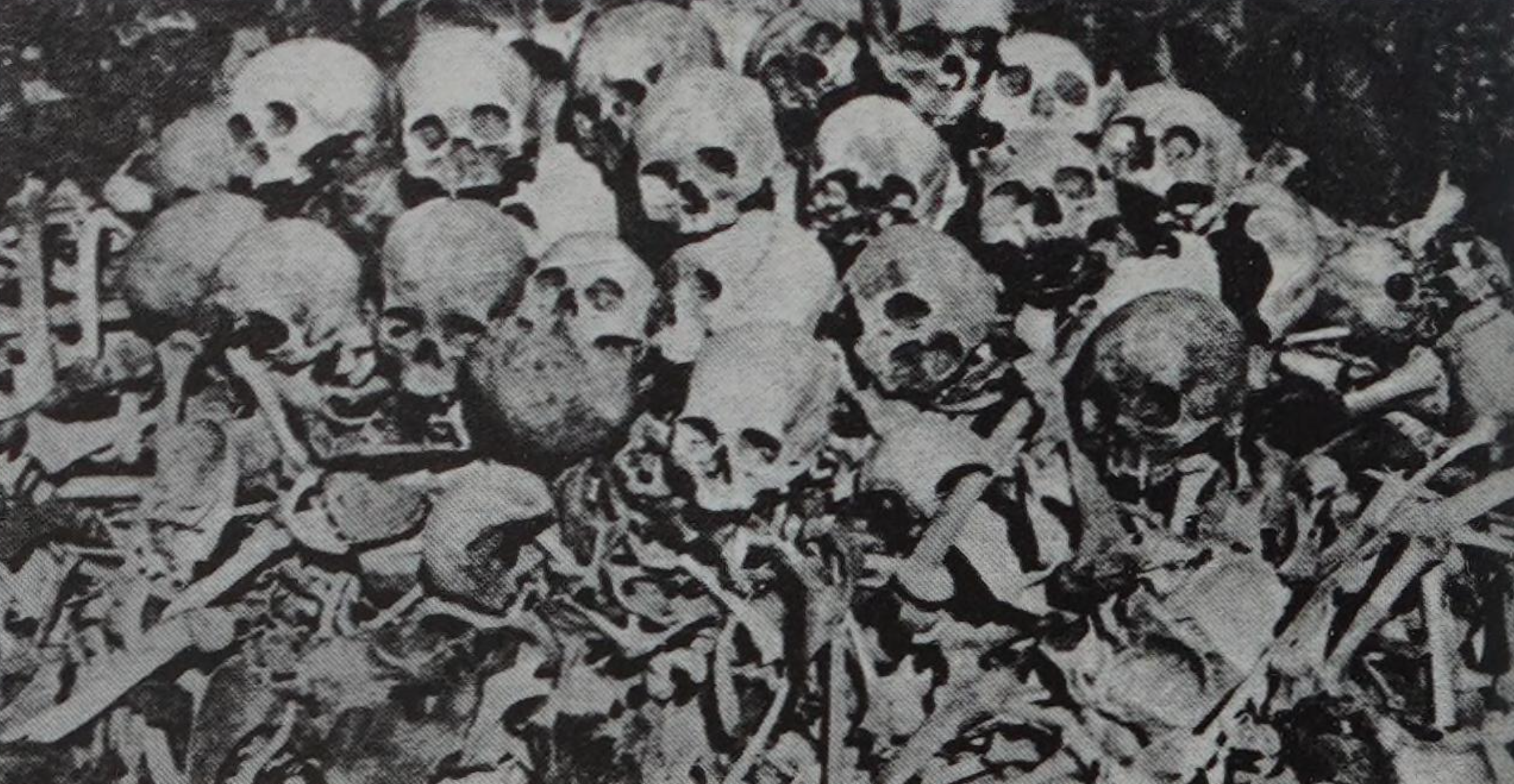
Unearthed victims of a massacre near Chengde, Hebei.

In a study published in 1996, historian Mitsuyoshi Himeta estimates that the Three Alls policy, sanctioned by Emperor Hirohito himself, was directly and indirectly responsible for the deaths of more than 2,700,000 Chinese civilians. Max Hastings writes that several million Chinese civilians died from the policy.

Li Enhan estimates a total of 3,180,000 Chinese civilians who lived in Communist guerilla base areas in North China massacred by Japanese forces throughout the whole war according to Communist records, but notes that those figures were incomplete. Another 2,760,000 civilians were forcibly enslaved.

On January 30, 1946, Ye Jianying wrote to the United Nations Relief and Rehabilitation Administration and the Hebei-Rehe-Beiping-Tianjin Branch Office of the Chinese National Relief and Rehabilitation Administration on the devastation left behind by Japanese forces in Communist liberated zones. In the letter, he explained that during the eight-year war, Japanese and Chinese Collaborationist forces conducted repeated "mopping-up" and "annihilation" operations in the liberated zones. Since 1940, they further implemented the so-called "Three Alls Policy", creating so-called "no-man's-lands" and causing severe harm to the civilians in the liberated zones. According to the preliminary investigations by the Provisional Relief Committee of the Chinese Liberated Areas in Yan'an, in the six liberated zones of Shanxi-Suiyuan, Shanxi-Chahar-Hebei, Hebei-Shandong-Henan, Taihang, Shandong, and Huaihai, Japanese forces massacred nearly 2 million civilians and abducted as many as 700,000 during the war.

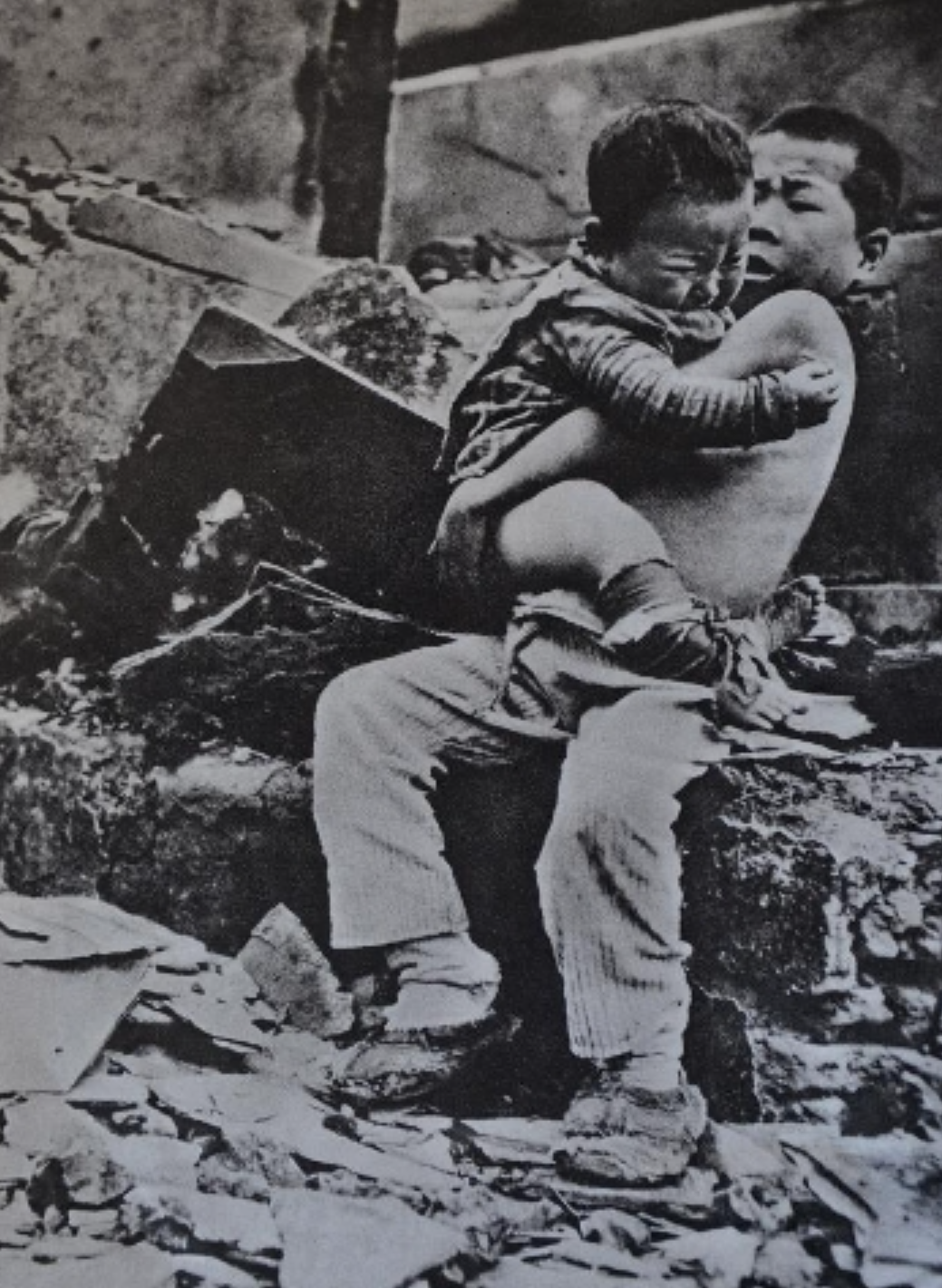
Two Chinese children embrace in the ruins of their village. Their parents were murdered before the photo was taken. Hebei, 1943.

Drawing on Himeta's works and those of Akira Fujiwara, Herbert P. Bix wrote that the Sankō Sakusen far surpassed the Rape of Nanking not only in terms of numbers, but in brutality as well: "These military operations caused death and suffering on a scale incomparably greater than the totally unplanned orgy of killing in Nanking, which later came to symbolize the war."

Chinese Communist sources record a large drop in the populations of their base areas, with their inhabitants plummeting from an initial figure of 44,000,000 to 25,000,000. According to Jules Archer, the Japanese were estimated to have killed most of the 19,000,000 missing people, although other scholars believe many fled to safer ground.

The consequences of the Japanese campaigns were further exacerbated by Chinese military tactics, which included the masking of military forces as civilians, or the use of civilians as deterrents against Japanese attacks. In multiple instances, the Japanese used chemical weapons against civilian populations in non-observance of international agreements they refused to sign at the time. Furthermore, while the pacification campaigns did prompt greater rates of desertions amongst Chinese guerrillas, they did not effectively combat the mobile Communist military units, who remained active in North China until the war's end.

== Etymology ==
The Chinese expression "Three Alls" originally appeared in the CCP's newspaper Liberation Daily published in July 1941 and was later popularized in Japan in 1957 when former Japanese soldiers released from the Fushun War Criminals Management Centre wrote a book called "The Three Alls: Japanese Confessions of War Crimes in China" (三光、日本人の中国における戦争犯罪の告白, Sankō, Nihonjin no Chūgoku ni okeru sensō hanzai no kokuhaku) (new edition: Kanki Haruo, 1979) in which Japanese veterans confessed to war crimes committed under the leadership of General Yasuji Okamura. The publishers were forced to stop the publication of the book after they had received death threats from Japanese militarists and ultranationalists.

In contradiction to their atrocities, Japanese officers claimed the actual name of the campaign was the "Three Prohibitions Campaign", alleging that the effort was actually an attempt by Japanese forces to prevent local Chinese civilians from burning, committing crimes, or killing people.

== Three Alls in Vietnam ==
Japan replaced the French government on 9 March 1945 and started openly looting the Vietnamese even more in addition to taking French owned properties and stole watches, pencils, bicycles, money and clothing in Bac Giang, and Bac Can. The Viet Minh rejected the Japanese demands to cease fighting and support Japan, so the Japanese implemented the Three Alls policy (San Kuang) against the Vietnamese, pillaging, burning, killing, looting, and raping Vietnamese women. The Vietnamese called the Japanese "dwarfed monsters" (Wa) and the Japanese committed these atrocities in Thai Nguyen province at Dinh Hoa, Vo Nhai and Hung Son.

On 17 August 1970, the North Vietnamese National Assembly Chairman Truong Chinh reprinted an article in Vietnamese in Nhan Dan, published in Hanoi titled "Policy of the Japanese Pirates Towards Our People" which was a reprint of his original article written in August 1945 in No. 3 of the Communist Magazine (Tap Chi Cong San) with the same title, describing Japanese atrocities like looting, slaughter, and rape against the people of north Vietnam in 1945. He denounced the Japanese claims to have liberated Vietnam from France with the Greater East Asia Co-prosperity Sphere announced by Tojo and mentioned how the Japanese looted shrines, temples, eggs, vegetables, straw, rice, chickens, hogs, cattle, vehicles, homes, stole land, built military stations and airstrips, and destroyed cotton fields and vegetable fields for peanut and jute cultivation in Annam and Tonkin.

The Japanese tried to play the Vietnamese against the French and play the Laotians against the Vietnamese by inciting Lao people to kill Vietnamese as Lao murdered seven Vietnamese officials in Luang Prabang and Lao youths were recruited to an anti-Vietnam organization by the Japanese when they took over Luang Prabang. The Japanese spread false rumours that the French were massacring Vietnamese at the time, to distract the Vietnamese from Japanese atrocities.

The Japanese created groups to counter the Viet Minh Communists like Vietnam Pao ve doan (Vietnam protection group) and Vietnam Ai quoc doan (Vietnam Patriotic Group) to force Vietnamese into coolie labour, take taxes and rice, and arrested anti-Japanese Vietnamese with their puppet government run by Tran Trong Kim.

The Japanese created the puppet Vietnam Phuc quoc quan (Vietnam restoration army), and tried to disrupt the Viet Minh's redistribution and confiscation of property of pro-Japanese Vietnamese traitors by disguising themselves as Viet Minh and then attacking people who took letters from them and organizing anti-French rallies and Trung sisters celebrations. Japanese soldiers tried to infiltrate Viet Minh bases with Viet Minh flags and brown trousers during their fighting.

The Japanese murdered, plundered and raped Vietnamese, and beheaded Vietnamese who stole bread and corn while they were starving according to their martial law. They shot a Vietnamese pharmacy student to death outside of his own house when he was coming home from guard duty at a hospital after midnight in Hanoi and also shot a defendant for a political case in the same city. In Thai Nguyen province, Vo Nhai, a Vietnamese boat builder was thrown in a river and had his stomach stabbed by the Japanese under suspicion of helping Viet Minh guerillas. The Japanese slit the abdomen and hung the Dai Tu mayor upside down in Thai Nguyen as well. The Japanese also beat thousands of people in Hanoi for not cooperating. Japanese officers ordered their soldiers to behead and burn Vietnamese.

Some claimed that Taiwanese and Chinese (Manchurian) soldiers in the Japanese army were participating in the atrocities against the Vietnamese but Truong Chinh said that even if it was true Taiwanese and Manchurian soldiers were committing the rapes and killing, their Japanese officers were the ones giving the orders and participating along with them. Truong Chinh said that the Japanese wanted to plunder Asians for their own market and take it from the United States and Great Britain and were imperialists with no intent on liberating Vietnam.

Truong Chinh wrote another article on 12 September 1945, No. 16 in Liberation Banner (Co Giai Phong) which was also reprinted on 16 August 1970 in Nhan Dan. He commemorated the August revolution against the Japanese, after the Japanese surrendered on 15 August 1945 then the Viet Minh started attacking and slaughtering Japanese, and disarming them in a nationwide rebellion on 19 August 1945. The Japanese had already disarmed the French and the Japanese themselves lost morale so the Viet Minh managed to seize control after attacking the Japanese. Viet Minh had begun fighting in 1944, when the French were attacked on Dinh Ca in October 1944 and in Cao Bang and Bac Can French were attacked by Viet Cong in November 1944 and the French and Japanese fought each other on 9 March 1945, so in Tonkin the Viet Cong began disarming French soldiers and attacking the Japanese. In Quang Ngai, Ba To, Yen Bai, and Nghia Lo the political prisoners who escaped the Japanese were attacked by Meo (Hmong) tribesmen and in Hoa Binh and Lang Son by Muong tribesmen. Viet Minh took control of six provinces in Tonkin after 9 March 1945 within two weeks. The Viet Minh led a brutal campaign against the Japanese where many died from 9 March 1945 to 19 August 1945. Truong Chinh ended the article with a quote from Sun Yatsen, "The revolution is not yet won. All comrades must continue their all out efforts!"

In Hanoi on 15–20 April 1945 the Tonkin Revolutionary Military Conference of the Viet Minh issued a resolution that was reprinted on pages 1–4 on 25 August 1970 in the Nhan Dan journal. It called for a general uprising, resistance and guerilla warfare against the Japanese by establishing seven war zones across Vietnam named after past heroes of Vietnam, calling for propaganda to explain to the people that their only way forward was violent resistance against the Japanese and exposing the Vietnamese puppet government that served them. The conference also called for training propagandists and having women spread military propaganda, and target Japanese soldiers with Chinese language leaflets and Japanese language propaganda. The Viet Minh's Vietnamese Liberation Army published the "Resistance against Japan" (Khang Nhat) newspaper. They also called for the creation of a group called "Chinese and Vietnamese Allied against Japan" by sending leaflets to recruit overseas Chinese in Vietnam to their cause. The resolution called on forcing French in Vietnam to recognize Vietnamese independence and for the De Gaulle France (Allied French) to recognize their independence and cooperate with them against Japan.

The Japanese forced Vietnamese women to become comfort women and with Burmese, Indonesian, Thai, and Filipino women they made up a notable portion of Asian comfort women in general. Japanese use of Malaysian and Vietnamese women as comfort women was corroborated by testimonies. There were comfort women stations in Malaysia, Indonesia, Philippines, Burma, Thailand, Cambodia, Vietnam, North Korea, and South Korea. A Korean comfort woman named Kim Ch'un-hui stayed behind in Vietnam and died there when she was 44 in 1963, owning a dairy farm, cafe, US cash, and diamonds worth 200,000 US dollars. One million Vietnamese were starved to death during World War II according to Thomas U. Berger. 2 billion US dollars' worth (1945 values) of damage, 148 million dollars of them due to destruction of industrial plants was incurred by Vietnam. 90% of heavy vehicles and motorcycles, cars and 16 tons of junks as well as railways, port installations were destroyed as well as one third of bridges. Some Japanese soldiers married Vietnamese women like Nguyen Thi Xuan and Nguyen Thi Thu and fathered multiple children with the Vietnamese women who remained behind in Vietnam while the Japanese soldiers themselves returned to Japan in 1955. The official Vietnamese historical narrative view them as children of rape and prostitution.

On 25 March 2000, the Vietnamese journalist Trần Khuê wrote an article "Dân chủ: Vấn đề của dân tộc và thời đại" where he harshly criticized ethnographers and historians in Ho Chin Minh city's Institute of Social Sciences like Dr. Đinh Văn Liên and Professor Mạc Đường who tried to whitewash Japan's atrocities against the Vietnamese by portraying Japan's aid to the South Vietnamese regime against North Vietnam as humanitarian aid, changing the death toll of 2 million Vietnamese dead at the hands of the Japanese famine to 1 million, and describing the Japanese invasion as a presence and calling Japanese fascists simply Japanese at the Vietnam-Japan international conference. He accused them of changing history in exchange for only a few tens of thousands of dollars, and the Presidium of international Vietnamese studies in Hanoi did not include any Vietnamese women. The Vietnamese professor Văn Tạo and Japanese professor Furuta Moto both conducted a study in the field on the Japanese induced famine of 1945 admitting that Japan killed 2 million Vietnamese by starvation.

== In popular culture ==
The 2008 movie The Children of Huang Shi, which covers the Japanese invasion from 1938 to 1945, is set in part during the sankō sakusen.
