= Agriculture in Lebanon =

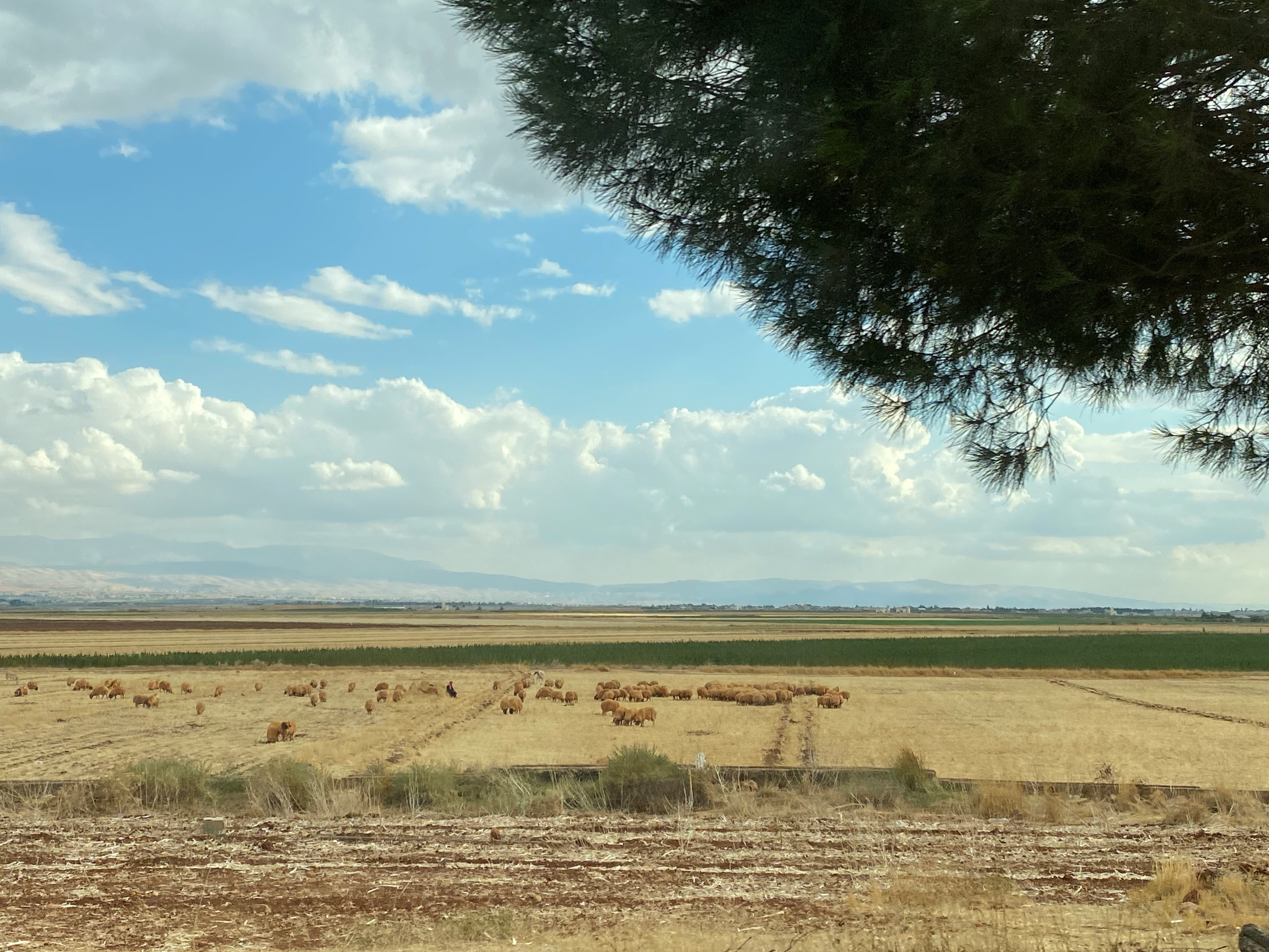
Sheep and fields in Bekaa Valley (2021)

Agriculture in Lebanon is the third most productive sector in the country after the tertiary and industrial sectors. It contributes 3.1% of GDP and 8 percent of the effective labor force. The sector includes an informal Syrian labor and is dependent on foreign labor for its productivity. However, tobacco crops mostly rely on household labor, largely performed by women and children.

Main crops include cereals (mainly wheat and barley), fruits and vegetables, olives, grapes, and tobacco, along with sheep and goat herding. Mineral resources are limited and are only exploited for domestic consumption. Lebanon, which has a variety of agricultural lands, from the interior plateau of the Beqaa Valley to the narrow valleys leading downward to the sea, enables farmers to grow both European and tropical crops. Tobacco and figs are grown in the south, citrus fruits and bananas along the coast, olives in the north and around the Shouf Mountains, and fruits and vegetables in the Beqaa Valley. More exotic crops include avocados, grown near Byblos, and hashish (a major crop in the Beqaa Valley). Although the country benefits from favorable farming conditions and diverse microclimates, it relies on food imports, which make up 80% of its consumption.

== History ==
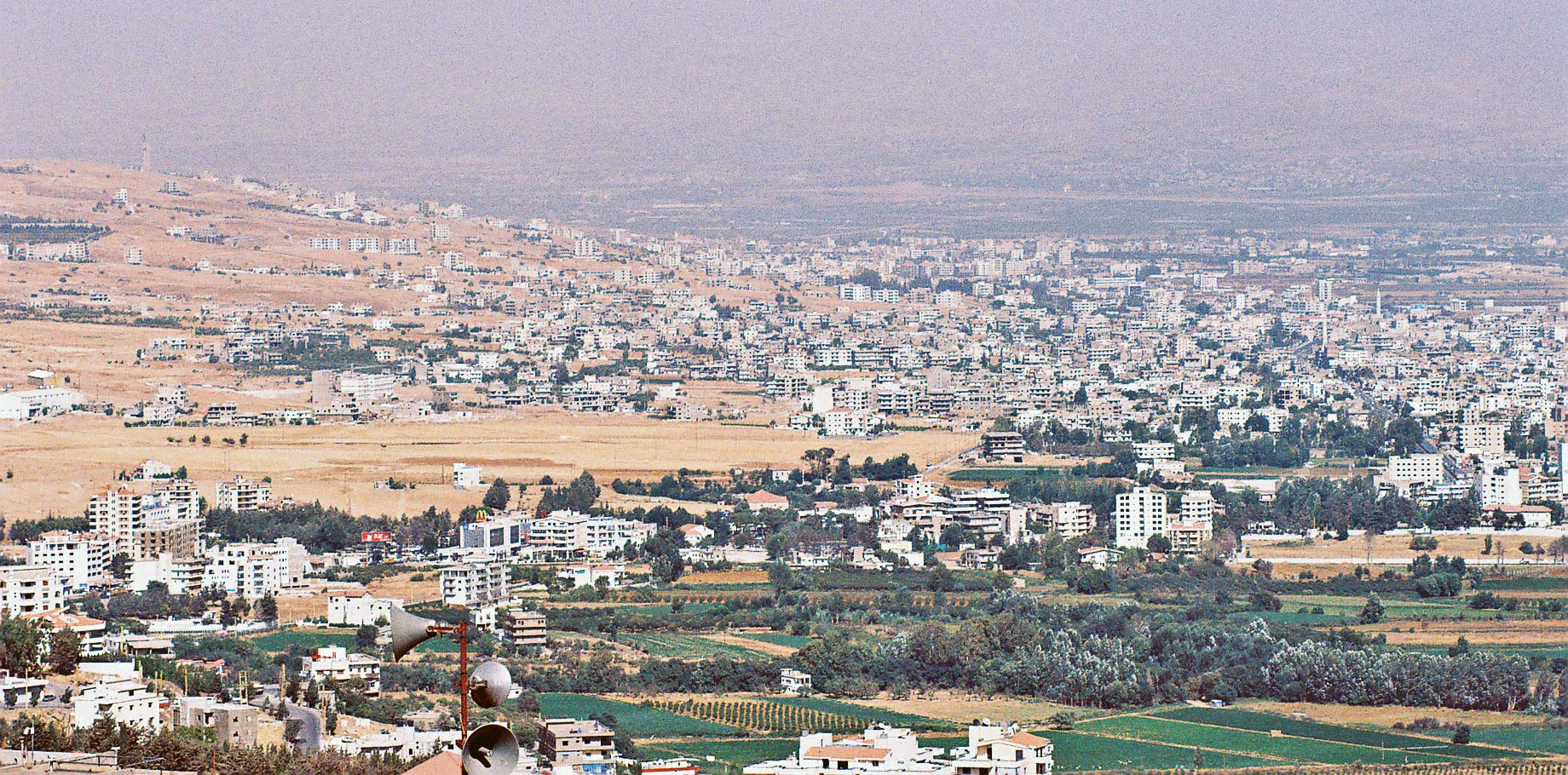
During Roman rule, the Beqaa Valley was considered to be the granary of Ancient Rome.

Agriculture in Lebanon dates back to Phoenician times, with the first trading activities taking place in the eastern Mediterranean. The wine making tradition, which has a 5,000 years of history in the region, was a known skill for its ancient dwellers. The Phoenicians tended vineyards, made wine and exported a significant amount to neighboring countries such as Egypt, Greece and Assyria. Although the trading activity was active in that period, however agriculture was not their main source of wealth because most of the land was not arable; therefore, they focused on commerce and trading instead. They did, however, raise sheep and sell them and their wool.

During Arab rule in the Middle Ages, the country enjoyed an economic boom, in which the Lebanese harbors of Tyre and Tripoli were busy with shipping of industrial and agricultural products. Lebanese products were sought after not only in Arab countries, but also throughout the Mediterranean Basin. This period of economic growth was later oppressed with the beginning of the Ottoman rule and the high taxes imposed on the Lebanese production.

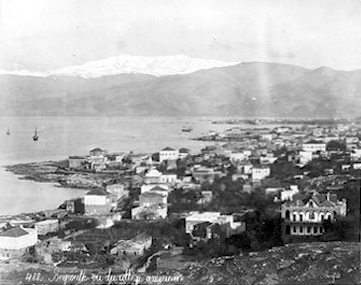
Beirut in the 19th century. In that period, even the capital had a significant portion of agricultural land, along with the bordering rural regions.

In the first half of the 20th century, Lebanon had regained its past agricultural boom, where almost one-fourth of its land had been cultivable (the highest proportion in the Arab world). After the 1950s and the prosperous decades that followed, agriculture faced a decline with the beginning of the Lebanese Civil War and after the Israeli invasion in the early 1980s. In the latter period, the government prepared plans to irrigate an additional 60,000 hectares, and by 1984 studies were under way on six major irrigation projects, all designed to be carried out as part of the 1982–1991 reconstruction plan. However, with the Israeli invasion came a diversion of water from rivers mainly located in the south. Even in the relative calm between 1978 and 1981, about 1,100 hectares of tobacco were destroyed, 300 hectares of agricultural land were abandoned because of land mines, and 51,000 olive trees and 70,000 fruit trees were destroyed, according to the United Nations High Commissioner for Refugees.

In 1935, French Mandate authorities established a private tobacco monopoly (Régie), which granted licenses to political elites (zu'ama). The 1948 Nakba cut off longstanding trans-border trade networks with Palestine and displaced over 100,000 refugees. Throughout the 1950s and 1960s, southern tobacco farmers organised cross-sectarian labour unions to protest landlord license speculation and low purchasing prices. This movement resulted in the 1973 Nabatiyeh Tobacco Uprising, which forced state subsidies for prices and smallholder licensing. In 1993, the Régie was nationalised and licenses were redistributed directly to resident farmers.

By the mid-1980s, Lebanon had become one of the world's most prominent narcotics trafficking centers, with the prosperous phase that it witnessed (especially in the Beqaa valley). Before 1975, much of this trade was exported by air from small airstrips in the Beqaa Valley. After the valley came under Syrian control, the drug crop left the country by sea through Christian-controlled ports to Cyprus, overland to Syria or sometimes through Israel to Egypt.

In the early 1990s, the Lebanese government and the United Nations Development Programme (UNDP) launched an initiative to replace drug crops with legitimate alternatives. The UNDP estimated some $300 million was required for rural development of the Beqaa. Lebanon was removed from the U.S. government's list of major drug producing countries in 1997.

== The main agriculture areas in Lebanon ==
Lebanon's main agriculture areas are: the Coastal Strip, Akkar plain with upper Mount Lebanon, Bekaa Valley, Mountainous region, Western slope of anti-Lebanon range, Southern Hills. Here are the following harvest type of each of these areas:

- The Coastal Strip: citrus, banana & horticulture & greenhouse production
- Akkar plain with upper Mount Lebanon: cereals, potatoes, grapes & vegetables
- Bekaa valley: potatoes, grains, fruits & vegetables
- Mountainous region: orchards & vegetables
- Western slope of Anti-Lebanon range: grapes, olives & cherries
- Southern hills: olives, tobacco, almonds & grains

== Major agricultural products ==
Lebanon produces a variety of primary products for both export and domestic consumption. Lebanese agricultural exports are mainly concentrated in the Arab League countries. In 2003, approximately 350,000 metric tons of commodities were exported to the surrounding region, primarily Saudi Arabia, with potatoes being the fastest-growing vegetable export (30% of total exports). Other regions that import Lebanese agricultural products include North America (3,123 metric and 1% of total exports in 2003), primarily the United States which imports products such as almonds, apricots, beans, cucumbers and gherkins, nuts and orange juice, and members of the European Union. This table includes the top ten Lebanese exported agricultural products for the year 2004:

	Commodity	Quantity (Mt)	Value (000 US$)	Unit Value (US$)
1	Maize	290,530	48,538	167
2	Tobacco leaves	9,260	21,981	2,374
3	Apples	39,795	20,640	519
4	Potatoes	45,754	8,311	182
5	Beverages Non-alcoholic	18,650	7,980	428
6	Prepared Vegetables	6,719	7,341	1,093
7	Wine	1,433	7,193	5,020
8	Prepared Nuts	3,811	7,115	1,867
9	Sugar confectionery	2,255	7,075	3,137
10	Pastry	3,616	5,545	1,533

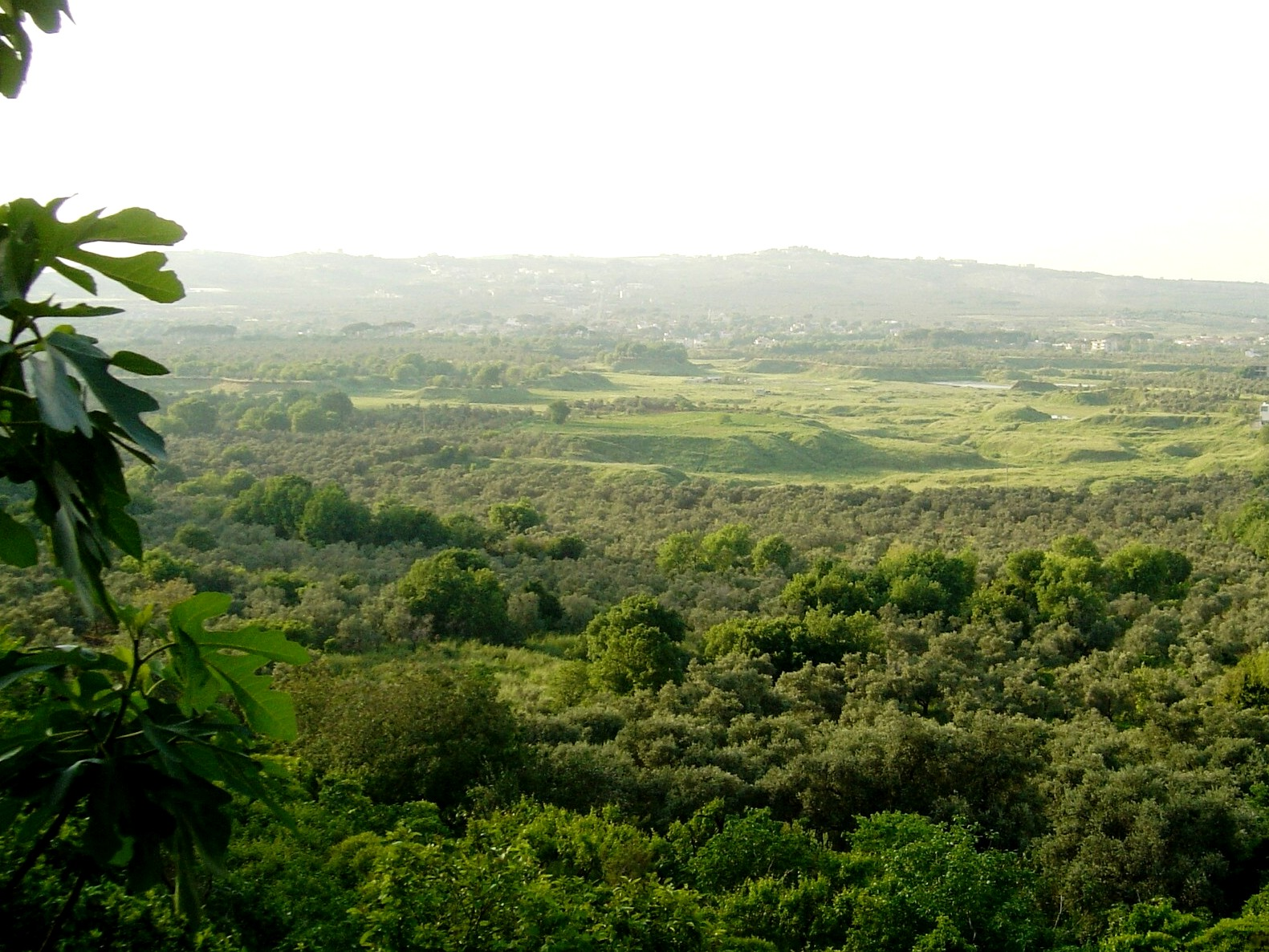
- Olive fields in Amioun, El-Koura district.
  Mt = Metric Ton

=== Crops ===
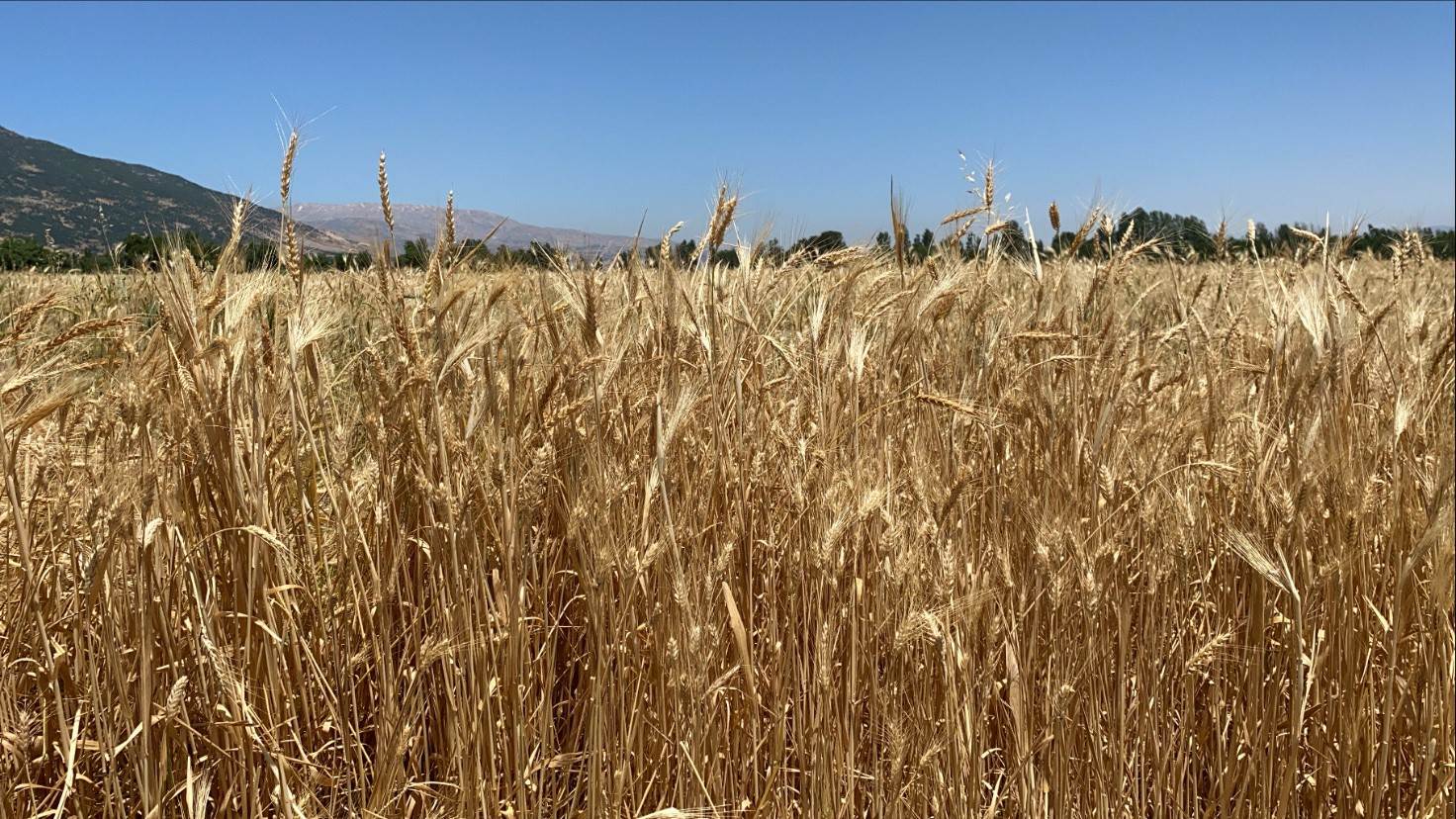
Wheat in Ammiq Village, Bekaa

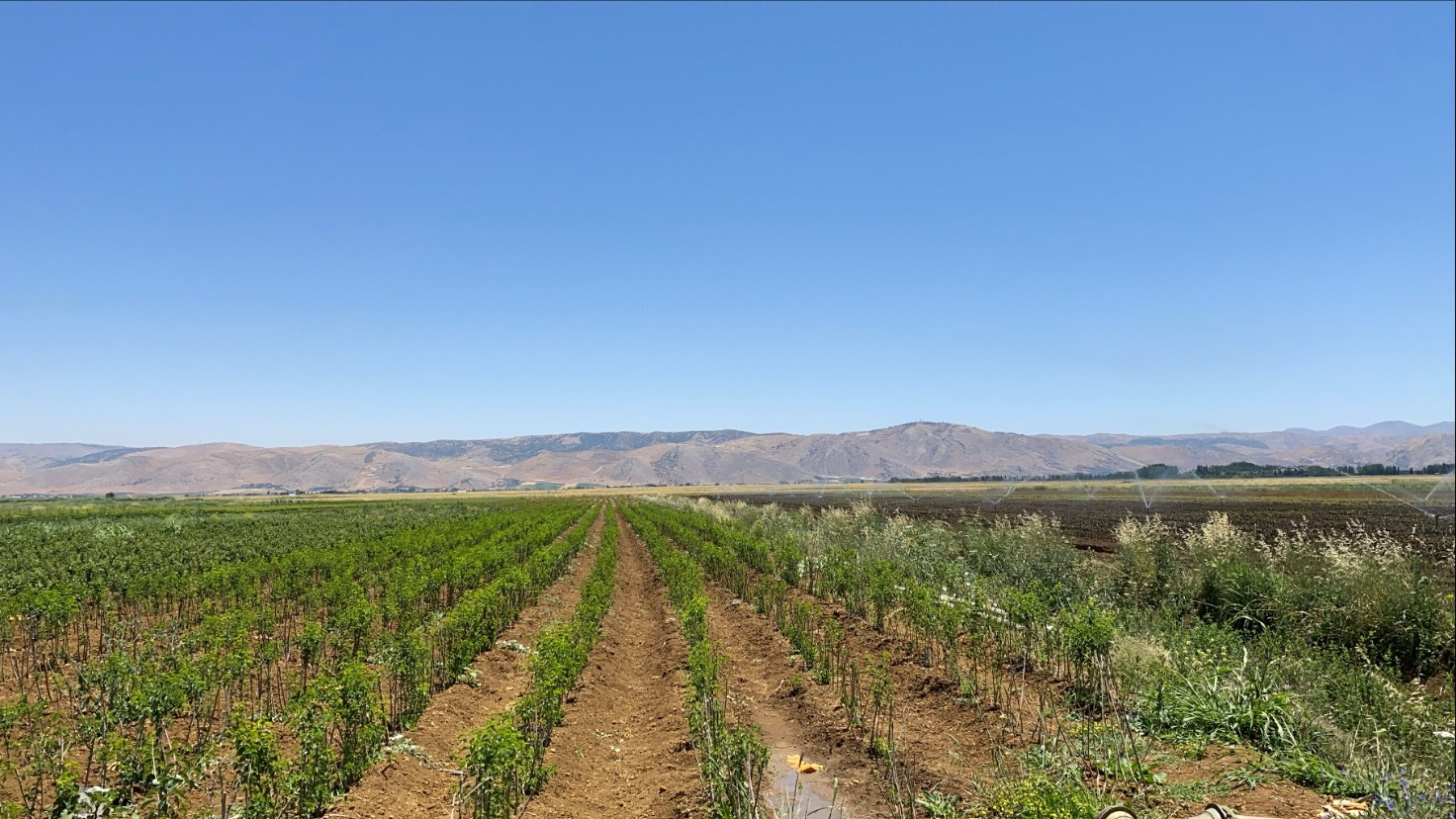
Varied crops harvested in a large agriculture land in Ammiq, Beqaa

Lebanon produces crops in five major categories: cereals, fruits (not including olives), olives, industrial crops (such as sugar beet and tobacco), and vegetables. Fruit and olive trees occupy 45% of the total cultivated area, and have increased by about 230,000 m^{2} in the past 10 years. The area covered by greenhouse production has also significantly increased over the past years, from 6,700 m^{2} in the late 1980s to almost 50,000 m^{2} in 1999. Agricultural production in greenhouses is more intensive than in open fields and requires more agrochemicals (pesticides and fertilizers). Agricultural production is concentrated in the Beqaa, which accounts for 42% of total cultivated land. The Beqaa hosts 62% of the total area used for industrial crops (including sugar beet, tobacco, and vineyards) and 57% of the total area used for cereal production. The North (Akkar and Koura regions) hosts 40% of the area used for olive production in the country. Fruit trees cover 24% of the total cultivated area.

In the villages on the southern border of Lebanon, there exists a monoculture on tobacco. A lot of those lands were formerly used for a variety of crops that changed with the seasons. The main reason for this is that tobacco is a hardy crop that is uniquely adapted to the region's dry and hilly topography, as it survives on morning dew. Therefore, it needs no expensive irrigation systems, which is ideal in a region that Israeli forces regularly targets. Since 1993 the Lebanese state-owned tobacco monopoly, the Régie Libanaise des Tabac et Tombacs, has guaranteed the purchase of tobacco at subsidized prices to ensure that citizens would stay on their land during the Israeli occupation. This presents the people living at the southern border of Lebanon an existential s to economic lifeline in times of war.

The table below lists the land used for major types of crops by Governorates (in m^{2}) for year 1999: Lebanon also produces cannabis for medical use.

Governorate	Cereals	Fruit Trees	Olives	Industrial crops	Vegetables
Mount Lebanon	3,140	97,820	77,678	1,613	31,100
North	120,380	135,685	209,628	37,769	128,584
Beqaa	297,737	217,570	31,443	153,232	259,743
South	37,638	123,304	89,340	14,625	20,753
Nabatieh	59,525	20,768	116,124	40,026	12,141
Total	518,420	595,147	524,213	247,265	452,321

=== Tobacco farming ===
Tobacco is locally known as al-nabti al-murrah ("the bitter crop") and is also referred to as the crop of resistance, reflecting it's importance to livelihoods in the conflict-affected border region. As an annual dryland crop, tobacco is well adapted to the hilly terain and arid climate of southern Lebanon. It's cultivation remains important to village households despite the challenges posed by recurring conflict in the border region.

In the southern villages, tobacco production is organised primarily through household labour. Women perform most stages of cultivation and processing, including planting, harvesting, threading and drying the leaves, while children and elderly relatives may also participate. Men are more prominent in the institutional and commercial levels of the industry, including the administration of the Regie. This division is partly connected to migration and warfare. Indeed many working-age men leave the villages for employment, education or military activity. The resulting income is generally modest, but supports women-led households and helps to keep otherwise depopulated border villages inhabited. Munira Khayyat characterizes tobacco as both a source of relative independence and a demanding obligation, since its cultivation is labour intensive, increasingly expensive and difficult for households to abandon.

The polticial economy of tobacco in Southern Lebanon developed from earlier Ottoman and French colonial monopolies. Under the French Mandate, cultivation licences were largely controlled by landowners and political notables who rented or distributed them through patronage networks. During the 1950s to 1970s, tobacco farmers formed cross-secterian labour organisations that brought together Shi'a and Maronite cultivators, often in cooperation with communist and other left-wing movements. On 22 January 1973, thousands of labourers occupied the Regie's regional office in Nabatieh, demanding higher purchasing prices, restrictions on licence speculation and the nationalisation of the monopoly. The Regie was eventually nationalised in 1993 and placed under the ministery of finance. Cultivation licences were redistributed to residents who continued farming in villages under Israeli occupation, partly to provide income independent of the occupation economy.

=== Livestock ===
Livestock production in Lebanon is an important activity, particularly in mountainous areas and in the Baalbek–Hermel area on the eastern mountain chain, where soil fertility is relatively low. While the number of goats have been relatively stable for more than two decades, sheep production has increased sharply. In recent years, livestock production (goats and sheep) has relied increasingly on feed blocks and feed supplements, thereby reducing dependence on wild grazing and ultimately leading to more sedentary animal production. Bovines and dairy production is becoming increasingly popular. In the past five years, several medium-to large-scale dairy farms have been established in the North and in the Beqaa. Several grant and loan agreements (proposed by organizations such as USAID) have encouraged farmers to expand dairy production. The table shows the evolution of livestock production from 1980 to 1999:

Category	1980	1999	Variation (%)
Cows	55,612	75,874	+ 36
Sheep	145,068	378,050	+ 160
Goats	444,448	435,965	2
Total	645,128	889,889	+ 38

=== Horticulture ===
Lebanon produces a variety of fruits and vegetables. The largest crops (more than 20 kilo tonnes in 2003) include potatoes, oranges, apples and grapes. Exotic crops include avocados mainly in north Mount Lebanon and hashish in the Beqaa valley.

Horticulture has traditionally provided the Lebanese with all their fresh fruit and vegetable needs, with a smaller export industry. However, loosened border controls and increasing imports have threatened local industries. In recent years governmental projects such as Export Plus have put into action the encouragement of local fruits and vegetables production, quality control and investment incentives for farmers in order to boost their produce and raise the level of the Lebanese horticulture industry. The tables below show the exported quantities of major crops (Metric tons) which include potatoes, apples and grapes, from 2002 to 2005:

Year	Potato	Apple	Grape
2002	130,570	18,805	17,321
2003	108,527	27,883	32,387
2004	144,702	55,337	28,904
2005	106,012	50,357	9,120

=== Viticulture ===
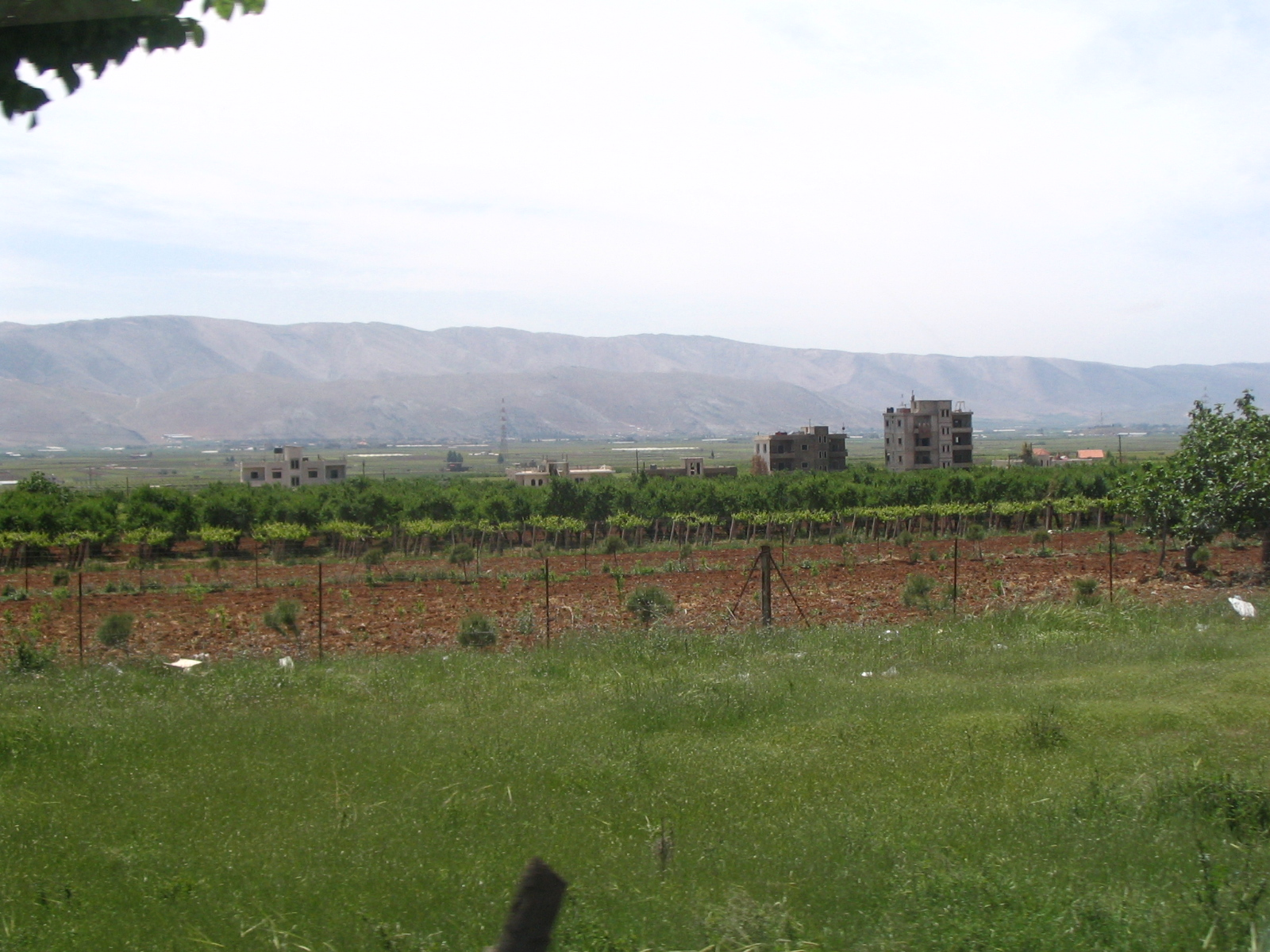
Vineyards near Zahlé, in the central Beqaa Valley.

Viticulture in Lebanon, which is considered a thriving industry nowadays, is mainly concentrated in the Beqaa Valley with wineries producing an annual amount of approximately 600,000 cases of wine. Wineries like Château Ksara, Château Kefraya, Château Musar and Massaya grow French wine varieties such as Cabernet Sauvignon, Merlot and Rhone varietals such as Cinsaut, Carignan and Grenache, along with some indigenous grapes like the Musar White, a blend of Obaideh and Merwah. Lebanese wine has an export success, with many wineries exporting over 50% of their production – and in the case of smaller wineries, as much as 90%. Exports cover several European and North American countries, France's Lebanese wine imports, for example, had 7% of the top five imports between the two countries' bilateral trade in 2005.

=== Dairy ===
In recent statistics from the Lebanese Ministry of Agriculture, there were 80,000 cattle, including 65,000 dairy cows, 350,000 sheep, including 315,000 milk sheep, and 450,000 goats, including 400,000 dairy goats. Of the dairy cows, 40% are of the local breed, 26% are purebred Friesian imported from Germany and the Netherlands, and 34% are crosses between Baladi and Canadian Holstein. The Friesians and the crossbred Holsteins have a generally good milk production and are kept, for the most part, on small farms, with an average of five cows per farm. The majority of the sheep are Awassi and goats are local Baladi. Both are kept in extensive and semi-sedentary systems, where productivity is low. The value of exported dairy products has been diminishing in recent years except for cheese which has gained a significant rise in its value. This table shows the variations in value of Lebanese exports from 2001 to 2004:

Product Group	Value (000 US$) 2001	Value (000 US$) 2002	Value (000 US$) 2003	Value (000 US$) 2004
Milk & cream and milk products other than butter or cheese	1,189	538	746	594
Butter and other fats and oils derived from milk	473	852	89	76
Cheese and Curd	443	702	1,800	2,049

=== Fishing ===
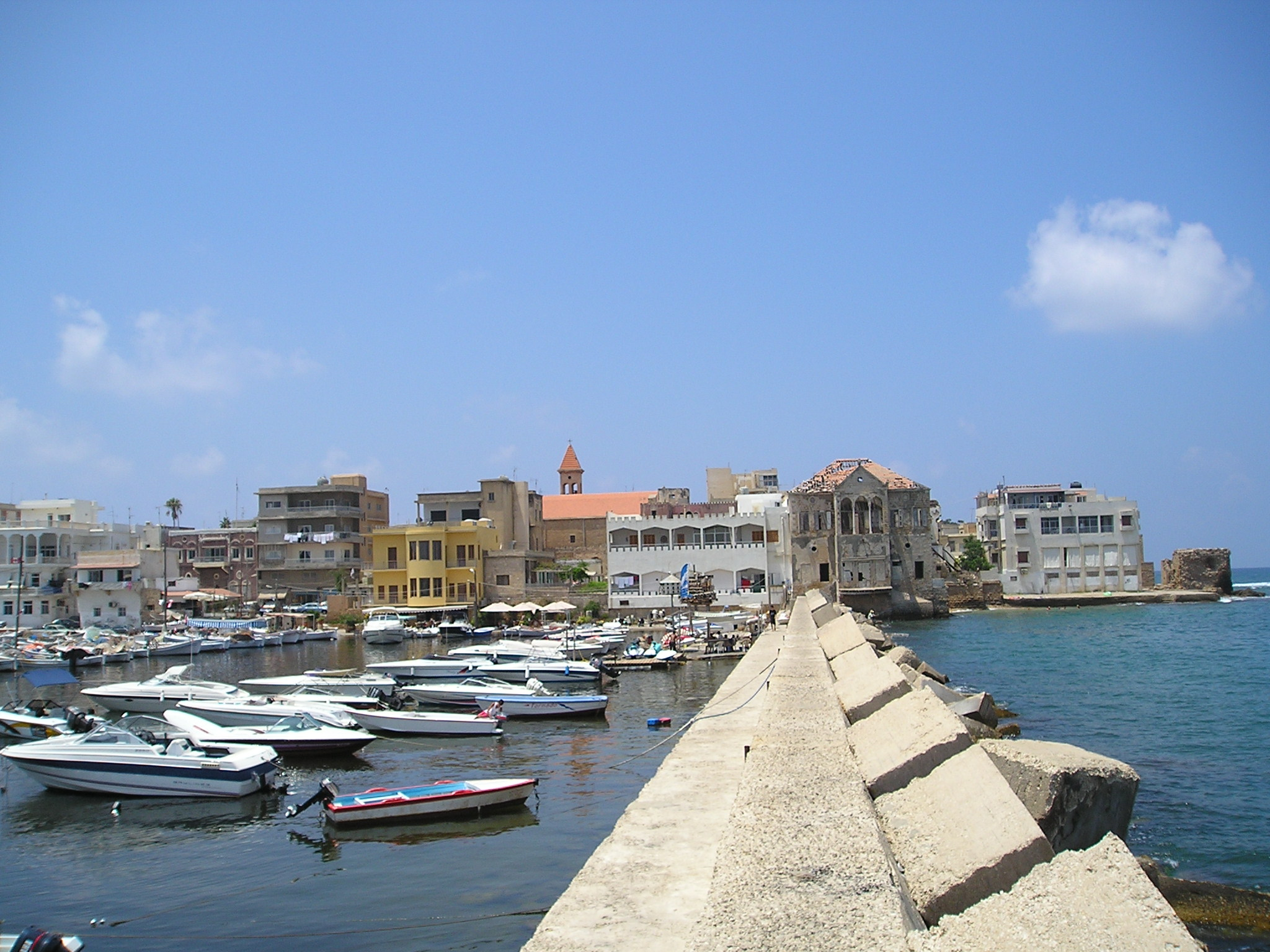
Docked fishing boats at the harbor of Tyre, South Lebanon.

In a 1999 report done by the "Regional Socio-Economic Development Program for South Lebanon" indications reveal that Lebanon has 3,000 to 4,000 fishermen. Annual fish production in 1996 doubled in average over a phase of ten years, with production amounting to 4,485 tonnes (4,110 tonnes of sea fish and 375 tonnes of freshwater fish, mostly in fish farms). Fishing in rivers has relatively small importance in Lebanon, with productions significantly taking place in the Lake Qaraoun (about 30 tonnes per year of mainly carp and trout production) and other rivers such as the Litani and Nahr Ibrahim.

While sea fish production in Lebanon is compared to that of neighboring countries on a km of coastline basis, freshwater fish production continues to lag behind. Absence of sea fish breeding along the coast due to strong coastal currents have been substituted by offshore fishing of pelagic fish (such as Tuna, Blue fish, etc.) using draglines. This type of fishing has become trendy in the past decade, mostly among sports amateurs equipped with motor speedboats.

=== Drugs ===
The Beqaa Valley, situated near the Syrian border, serves as a focal point for Lebanon's drug industry, characterized by the cultivation, production, and trade of various narcotics within the region. Studies indicate a significant involvement of various factions and militias, including Hezbollah, in Lebanon's drug economy, with Western intelligence estimating the annual production of over 4 million pounds (1,800 tonnes) of hashish and 20,000 pounds (9,100 kg) of heroin, generating profits exceeding $4 billion. Despite some of the harvest being retained for local use, a significant amount is smuggled worldwide. Despite ongoing efforts, the government's inability to control the drug-producing Beqaa Valley and address illicit Captagon factories allows for the persistent occurrence of drug trades, impacting Lebanon's economy and regional stability.

== Governance ==
Agriculture is a state responsibility in Lebanon, where the ministry of agriculture is involved in setting agricultural policies and regulations. In the 1990s, the Lebanese government has awarded 89 contracts in the agricultural sector worth a total of US$13.6 million and an additional 46 projects in the irrigation sector, worth US$51.8 million. Contracts include consultancy and design, as well as works and equipment supply. Capital investment in the agricultural sector includes the rehabilitation of the Ministry of Agriculture, land reclamation projects, as well as the rehabilitation of agricultural schools and research stations. The agricultural sector is struggling to survive in a competitive regional market. Through loans and grant agreements, the government has implemented large-scale irrigation projects and has taken steps to ban a long list of hazardous pesticides. However, there are many problems facing the agricultural development with effective extension programs, use of water-conserving irrigation techniques, and rational use of agrochemicals still scant or localized.

=== Key Policies and Actions ===
- Banning dangerous pesticides, the ministry of agriculture banned 110 pesticides in 1998, including aldrin, dieldrin, endrin and DDT.
- Safe handling of obsolete pesticides, FAO supported a project in 1998 (US$101,000) to assist the Lebanese government in eliminating a stock of 8.5 tonnes of pesticides and train the staff of the Agricultural Research Institute to manage and handle the pesticides stock.
- Phasing out methyl bromide, the ministry of economy initiated the Methyl Bromide Alternatives Project in May 1999. The project has shown the efficiency of all available alternatives to methyl bromide over four consecutive growing seasons in 19 sites around the country, totaling 52 greenhouses covering a total area of 20.5 km^{2}.
- Land reclamation projects:
1. Provided assistance, either financial or technical, to 1407 farmers.
2. Reclaimed 756 hectares of abandoned lands.
3. Supported the construction of several earth-lined hill lakes (total capacity of 5,300,000 m^{3}) and cement reservoirs (total capacity 500,000 m^{3}).
4. Terraced approximately 16,000 hectares. This is equivalent to 6.3% of the total surface area currently under cultivation.
- Improving water management, Canal 800 (a series of surface water distribution networks) and the IRMP will convert/add 32,255 hectares to irrigated agriculture. These irrigation schemes are designed to tap surface water resources and may therefore alleviate current demand pressure on groundwater.
- Promoting organic farming, the introduction and improvement of certified and labeled organic produce to local and foreign markets.

In September 1995, Lebanon through the Ministry of Agriculture signed the United Nations Convention to Combat Desertification (UNCCD). Lebanon has requested assistance from the United Nations Development Programme (UNDP) and the German Agency for Technical Cooperation (GTZ) to support the implementation of the convention and to establish a National Action Programme for Combating Desertification, which was launched in June 2003. The NAP project has four immediate goals:

1. Promotion of Innovative Trade Initiatives Promoted to Increase Market Opportunities for Dryland Products
2. Sub-national and Local Level NAP Priority Projects Implemented
3. Developing a National Resource Mobilization Strategy for UNCCD/NAP Implementation
4. Flood Risk Management and Water Harvesting for Livelihood Recovery in Baalback-Hermel

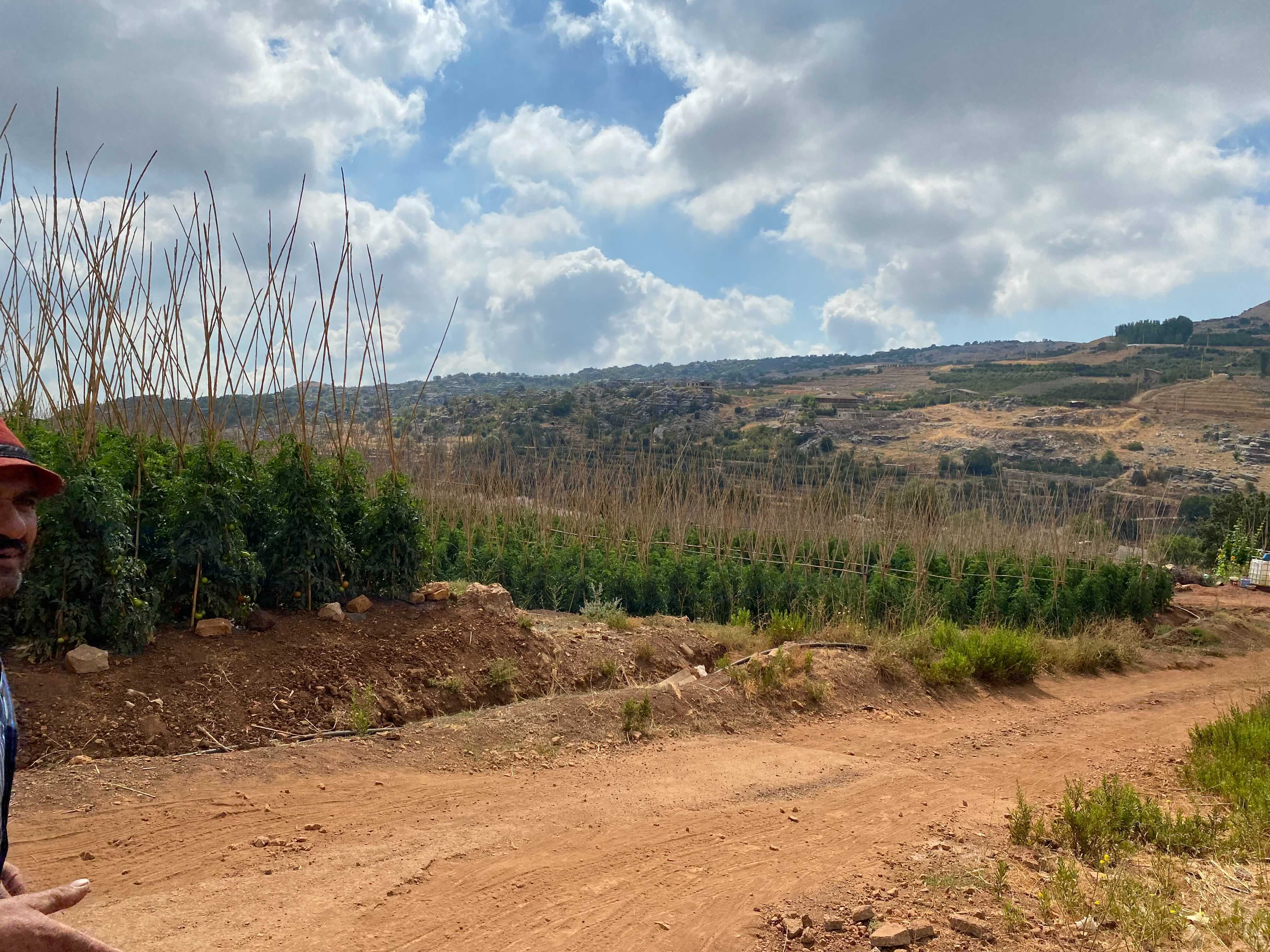
Small-scale agriculture in Mount Lebanon

== Current challenges ==
Lebanon's agriculture, which offers fertile land, landscaped terraces, and fresh and healthy produce, faces several challenges in recent years. Improper agricultural practices leading to soil erosion and impoverishment, depletion of underground water resources, water pollution and health impacts from inappropriate use of pesticides and fertilizers, and environmental pollution from haphazard dumping of slaughter waste and animal farms are from the main problems of this sector. Agriculture is also diminishing to rampant urbanization, such as in the coastal plains and in parts of the Beqaa Valley. The government's policies appear to be targeting the increase in the availability of water irrigation (especially in the South) and controlling the use of pesticides, with no or little investment or incentives for water- and soil-conserving irrigation techniques. The private sector is gradually taking advantage of new but small scale opportunities offered by organic farming and high-value agricultural produce.

The ongoing economic crisis in Lebanon and devaluation of the Lebanese pound have had adverse effects on the agricultural sector, leading to increased costs for vital imports like seeds and fertilizers. The economic strain intensifies pre-existing difficulties for farmers, encompassing escalating debts and inefficient agricultural practices. As a result, farmers are witnessing a decline in revenues and facing difficulties in meeting their loan repayment obligations.

The country's focus on the banking sector, real estate market and a fixed Lebanese pound as a post war reconstruction strategy, led the government to not invest in the sector and its development. The state has favored the services sector over the productive sector, resulting in some major challenges in local agriculture: heavy use of traditional techniques for agriculture by farmers, high dependence on imports from seeds to pesticides and fertilizers, most inputs are imported. A major dependence of Lebanese landowners on foreign labor, namely Syrian refugees working informally, is also a challenge which came as a result of the lack of importance and investment given to the sector.

Farmers do not have a financial institution to provide them with credit. Suppliers, filled this gap for farmers and became their first and main source of credit, by supplying them with the inputs they need to harvest. These suppliers have created an unsustainable and excess use of inputs resulting in a huge dependency of farmers to the imported goods suppliers provide them with. The Lebanese pound being volatile, and with its devaluation in comparison with the dollars, makes it difficult for farmers currently to be able to access these credits. They are unable to generate an income in dollars to buy the input, which are imported, thus priced in dollars. Farmers now, buy less inputs, which result in poor harvest quality, less harvest output and a poor profit for farmers in the Lebanese pounds.

=== Environmental warfare and unexploded bombs ===
For farmers in South Lebanon, the challenge of survival extends beyond financial trouble, as the agricultural landscape itself has been heavily weaponized by decades of conflict. During the 2006 Lebanon War, the Israeli military dropped approximately 4.6 million cluster bombs on the region. The attacks took place at the height of the tobacco season and burned large proportions of the harvest. Khayyat's work describes how Israeli forces burned fields and peppered them with cluster bombs during the month-long war. The war itself caused large losses in the agricultural sector. When the war ended, only a few farmers with the 'right' connections were compensated for their lost crops. Most farmers recovered on their own after the war. Unexploded bombs can still be found in agricultural fields and impact the livelihoods of farmers in South Lebanon. While the Israeli military stated these munitions were aimed at militant positions, researchers have described the massive deployment of cluster bombs in the final days of the 2006 Lebanon War as a form of environmental warfare, functioning to deliberately target ecologies and the livelihoods of farmers in the region. Khayyat writes that during the 2006 war the Israeli military did not differentiate its enemy (Hezbollah), from the landscape of life in South Lebanon. There was no distinction made between both. This form of modern, environmental warfare, targets life itself and its vital environments.

An example of the impact of this environmental warfare on agricultural practices in the region is the shift in livestock practices. Farmers have abandoned heavy cattle, as these easily detonate unexploded bombs. Instead, they have shifted to goats, which are lighter and therefore safer in lands with many unexploded bombs. When it comes to choosing crop, a similar shift has taken place. Anthropologist Munira Khayyat argues that farmers in border villages rarely plant fruit orchards. The trees take years to bear fruit, require costly irrigation and are targeted and destroyed by Israeli attacks as guerilla cover. Tobacco, on the other hand, grows quickly without irrigation. It is bought each year at a fixed price by the state tobacco monopoly, the Régie. Before Israel's withdrawal in 2000, 45% of Lebanon's tobacco was grown in the occupied border strip. Khayyat uses the term 'resistant ecologies' to refer to these practices. People continue their everyday life in environments that are characterised by violence and instability. She argues that practices adapting to precarious situations such as cultivating tobacco and herding goats show how communities continue to live in regions affected by war. Khayyat also argues that the shift towards tobacco farming has narrowed the agricultural base of the borderland. Khayyat studied the "marj" in one village. This refers to a fertile plain once used as base for vegetables, grapes, chickpeas and other crops. These grounds are now divided into private plots were only tobacco is planted. Some plots near the border were cleared of fruit trees to create space for tobacco farming. While being dependent on only one crop (tobacco), new challenges came to the surface. In 2018, a virus affected the gross of the tobacco planted in South Lebanon. This severely impacted the livelihood of farmers.

== See also ==
- Geography of Lebanon
- Mediterranean climate
- Eastern Mediterranean conifer-sclerophyllous-broadleaf forests
