= General Tanaka =

General Tanaka may refer to:

- Hisakazu Tanaka (1889–1947), Imperial Japanese Army lieutenant general
- Ryūkichi Tanaka (1896–1972), Imperial Japanese Army major general
- Shizuichi Tanaka (1887–1945), Imperial Japanese Army general
