= Ryūkichi Tanaka =

Japanese general (1893–1972)

- 田中 隆吉
- Born: July 9, 1893; Shimane, Japan
- Died: June 5, 1972 (aged 78)
- Military career
- Allegiance: Empire of Japan
- Branch: Imperial Japanese Army
- Service years: 1913–1945
- Rank: Major General
- Conflicts: Second Sino-Japanese War; World War II

Ryūkichi Tanaka (田中 隆吉, Tanaka Ryūkichi; 9 July 1893 – 5 June 1972) was a major general in the Imperial Japanese Army during World War II.

== Biography ==
=== Early military career ===
Tanaka was born in what is now part of the city of Yasugi in Shimane Prefecture, and attended a military preparatory school in Hiroshima. He graduated from the 26th class of the Imperial Japanese Army Academy in 1913, specializing in artillery, and was assigned to serve with the IJA 23rd Field Artillery Regiment based on Okayama.

=== Spymaster ===
After graduating from the 34th class of the Army Staff College in 1923, Tanaka served in various staff positions in the Imperial Japanese Army General Staff, and came into contact with Pan-Asianism theorist and nationalist writer Shūmei Ōkawa. He was sent on special assignment to Beijing and Kalgan in China and Manchuria from 1927 to 1929 to gather military intelligence. In October 1930, he was based in Shanghai, where he developed a close relationship with Yoshiko Kawashima, and assisted them in establishing their spy network. He was living together with Kawashima in Shanghai at the time of the Shanghai Incident of 1932, which he claimed in his post-war memoirs to have scripted, with Kawashima acting as an Agent provocateur to incite the riot with 20,000 Yen in funds provided by the Kwantung Army. However, there is no other written evidence to support this claim other than Tanaka's own memoirs. His relationship with Kawashima soured after a fictionalized account of their exploits was published in Japan which mentioned him by name and after he found that her movements were being closely monitored by KMT agents.

=== Later career ===
Recalled to Japan in August 1932. Tanaka was appointed commander of the IJA 4th Field Artillery Regiment. He was attached to the IJA 1st Heavy Field Artillery Regiment from 1934 to 1935, and then attached to the 2nd Section of the Kwantung Army staff from 1935 to 1937. From 1937 to 1939, Tanaka was commander of the IJA 25th Mountain Artillery Regiment in Manchukuo, which was at the disastrous Battle of Lake Khasan against the Soviet Union.

Recalled to Japan again from 1939 to 1940, Tanaka was appointed Chief of the Military Service Section, Military Administration Bureau within the Army Ministry.

In March 1940, he was promoted to major general, and briefly returned to China as Chief of Staff of the Japanese First Army, during which time he initiated an unsuccessful attempted to woo Chinese warlord Yan Xishan of Shanxi Province to support the Japanese cause. At the end of 1940, Tanaka was recalled back to Japan, and the following year became Commandant of the Nakano School, the primary espionage and sabotage training facility for the Japanese army.

Suffering from poor health, Tanaka went into the reserves until September 1942 when he was attached to the Eastern Defense Army; however, he was hospitalized from October due to acute depression, and retired from military service in March 1943.

In 1945, Tanaka was recalled and served as Commandant of Ratsu Fortress on the border of Korea with the Soviet Union at Rason. He remained at that post until the end of the war.

During the International Military Tribunal for the Far East after the war, Tanaka testified three times for the prosecution and twice for the defense. He was used by chief prosecutor Joseph Keenan to persuade Hideki Tōjō to revise his testimony referring to Emperor Hirohito's ultimate authority. During the trial, Life Magazine nicknamed him "The Monster", stating that he testified that General Araki Sadao was the mastermind behind Japanese militarism, charging General Doihara Kenji with running narcotics operations in Manchukuo and blaming Generals Tojo Hideki and Akira Muto of promoting policies favoring atrocities against prisoners of war. On the other hand, he defended Generals Shunroku Hata and Yoshijirō Umezu and Foreign Minister Mamoru Shigemitsu for having attempted to prevent or end the war, and promoted himself as both a war hero and "apostle of peace", stating also that he fully expected to be found guilty and executed.

In 1949, he moved to a cabin at Lake Yamanaka, where he attempted suicide in September. He died of colorectal cancer in 1972.
