= Environmental warfare =

Type of warfare

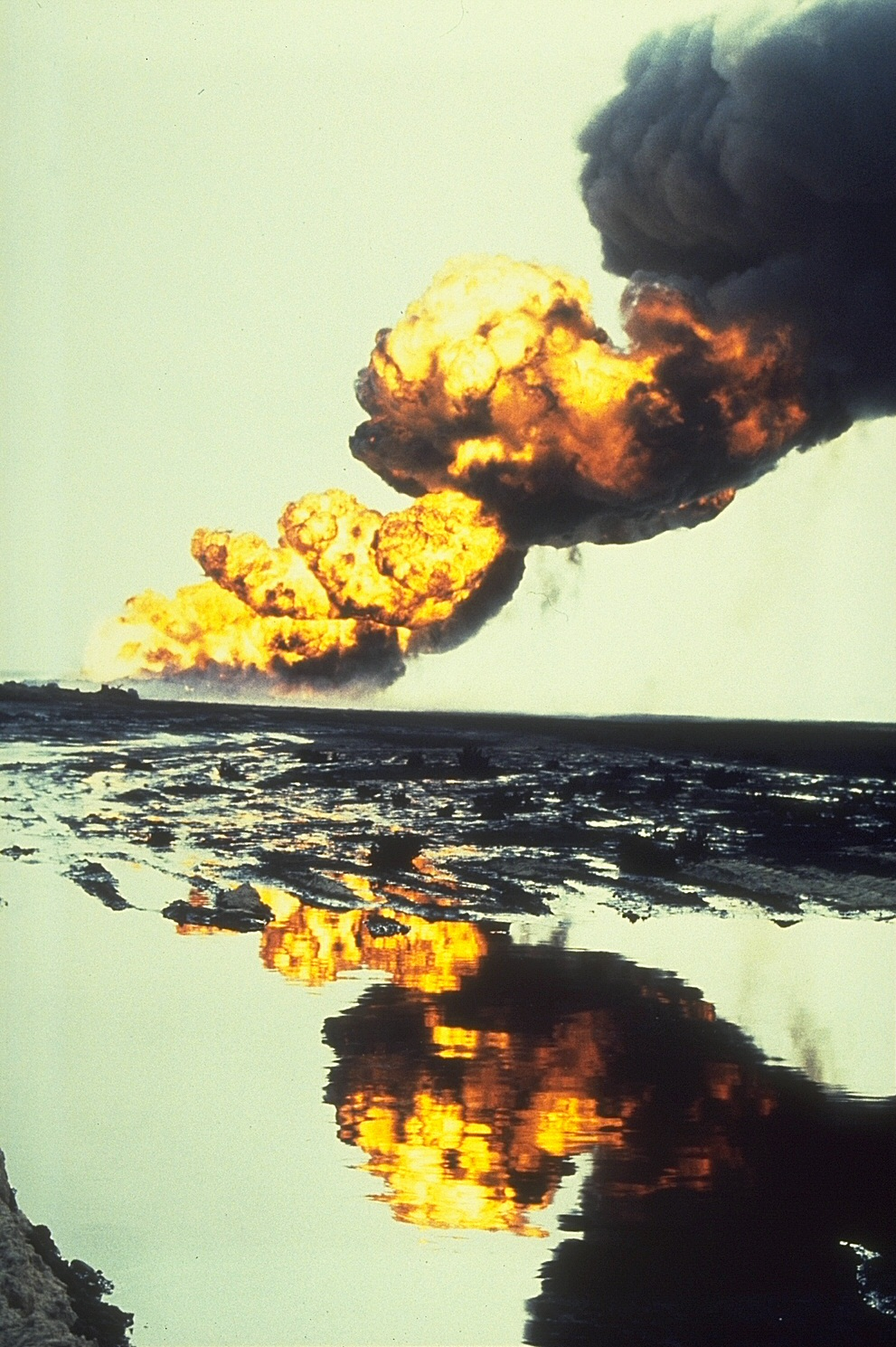
Bergan oil field fire during the Gulf War, 1991

Environmental warfare means waging warfare by means of deliberate environmental destruction or alteration, in order to repel enemy assault, as well as to hinder or injure the opponent or hamper the military supply-chain.

Criminal law deals with environmental warfare, also referred to as "environcide", as a crime against humanity and/or a crime against nature.

== Definition ==
Operations, which fall under environmental welfare can include hydrogeological, physical, and/ or chemical processes or substances. The goal of environmental warfare is not to kill the enemies but to generate a partial health damage for their societies or to distract the enemy in order to prevent or hinder attacks.

The following motivations to engage in environmental destruction can differ and have been scientifically differentiated into six motivations. Feuer categorized the reasons and incentives as being: ideological, cultural, political, technological, strategical or tactical.

== Examples ==
- Employment of the herbicide Agent Orange, 1965, Vietnam War
- Gulf War oil spill, 1991, Gulf War

== See also ==
- Ecocide
- Environmental crime
- Kuwaiti oil fires
- Environmental Modification Convention

== Sources ==
- Kreike, Emmanuel (2021). Scorched Earth: Environmental Warfare as a Crime Against Humanity and Nature. Princeton University Press. ISBN 978-0-691-13742-1.
