= June 16 Incident =

Date	June 16, 1922
Location	Guangzhou, Guangdong
Result	Guangdong Army victory
Territorial changes	The Guangzhou government was disbanded.

Belligerents
Guangdong Army Zhili clique	Guangzhou government

Commanders and leaders
Chen Jiongming; Ye Ju	Sun Yat-sen; Xu Chongzhi; Chan Chak

The June 16 Incident, also known as the Guangzhou uprising or the Chen Jiongming Rebellion, was a coup d'état led by Chen Jiongming against the Guangzhou government on June 16, 1922. The conflict began due to a dispute between Sun Yat-sen's policy of beginning the Northern Expedition and uniting China forcefully, and Chen Jiongming's policy of creating a federalist constitution. As a result, Chen suddenly led the Guangdong Army to attack the Presidential Palace, ending the Guangzhou government by expelling the Kuomintang from Guangzhou.

== Background ==
In 1917, the Constitutional Protection Movement began, and president Li Yuanhong stepped down. Sun Yat-sen established the Constitutional Protection junta, attempting to reinstate the Provisional Constitution, inviting Li Yuanhong to continue his presidency. In 1920, the Zhili-Anhui war came to an end with the Zhili clique victorious, forcing Duan Qirui to step down. However, the Zhili and Fengtian warlords in control of the Beiyang Government did not adopt the Provisional Constitution. In August, the Old Guangxi clique seized control of the Constitutional Protection junta, attacking eastern Guangdong and southern Fujian. This began the first Yue-Gui War. After Chen Jiongming and his army captured Guangdong, they invited Sun Yat-sen to return to Guangdong, forming the Guangzhou government.

The government established by Sun Yat-sen and Chen Jiongming would already begin major disputes over governance and expansion. Chen advocated for an American-style federation of provinces, conflicting with Sun's policy of the Northern Expedition and unification by force.

In June 1921, the Guangxi army once again launched an attack on Guangdong, beginning the second Yue-Gui War. It was a victory for the Guangzhou government. However, the Guangdong Army suffered heavy casualties and damaged its morale.

In October of that year, Sun Yat-sen began reorganizing the Guangdong Army to the Northern Expeditionary Army, to the dismay of Chen Jiongming. In December, Sun organized the Northern Expeditionary Headquarters in Guilin. Chen Jiongming resisted firmly, refusing to leave Guangzhou. This soon led to Wu Ting-fang replacing Chen as the governor of Guangdong, to the dismay of the Guangdong Army.

Chen Jiongming persuaded many southern warlords to not support the expedition. To the urges of Chen, both Tang Jiyao and Zhao Hengti refused to join Sun's expedition.

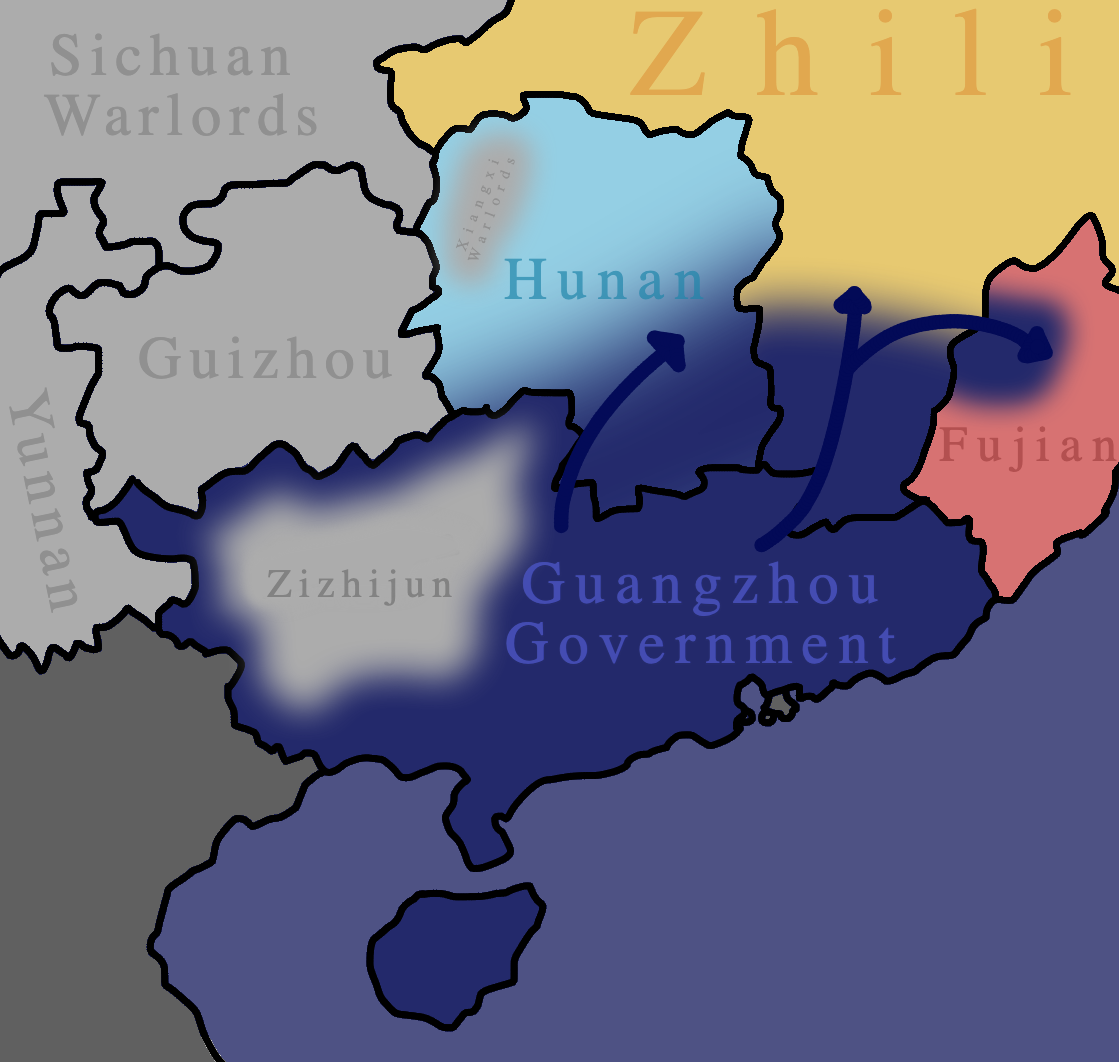
The political situation of Southern China at the time of the First Northern Expedition, 1922.

=== The Northern Expedition ===
By May 1922, the First Zhili–Fengtian War broke out, and with Sun Yat-sen believing Guangdong had stabilized enough, he joined forces with Hu Hanmin and Xu Chongzhi to invade the Zhili clique. The First Northern Expedition had begun. The Kuomintang's armies reached deeply into Jiangxi and southern Hunan, entering through three routes

On May 20, Ye Ju, alongside other generals of the Guangdong Army, demanded for Sun Yat-sen to reinstate Chen Jiongming as governor of Guangdong and the leader of the Guangdong Army. Sun continuously refused. Meanwhile, Chiang Kai-shek urged Chen Jiongming to submit to Sun's requests for him to join the Northern Expedition, but Chen refused. On June 3, Ye Ju declared martial law in Guangzhou.

== Guangzhou Uprising ==
On June 13, Chen Jiongming secretly conspired to attack Guangzhou. Martial law was declared throughout Guangdong Province, as Chen conspired alongside Wu Peifu and Chen Guangyuan to attack the Northern Expeditionary Army from both sides. By June 15, Ye Ju created strategies to besiege the Presidential Palace, sending armies to Shaoguan. The Guangdong Army began demanding for Sun Yat-sen to step down.

The coup began on June 16. Chen Jiongming's armies occupied Guangzhou, announced the dissolvement of the Guangzhou government, declared their alignment to the old National Assembly, and bombed the Presidential Palace. Sun immediately fled to Haizhu, while Chen took full control of the government offices. Yao Guanshan sent his divisions to cover Soong Ching-ling and other Kuomintang members as they fled. The Kuomintang was disarmed in Guangdong. The Palace guards were captured by the Guangdong Army. Longzhou was fiercely defended by the marine corps, preventing the Guangdong Army from deploying on the North River.

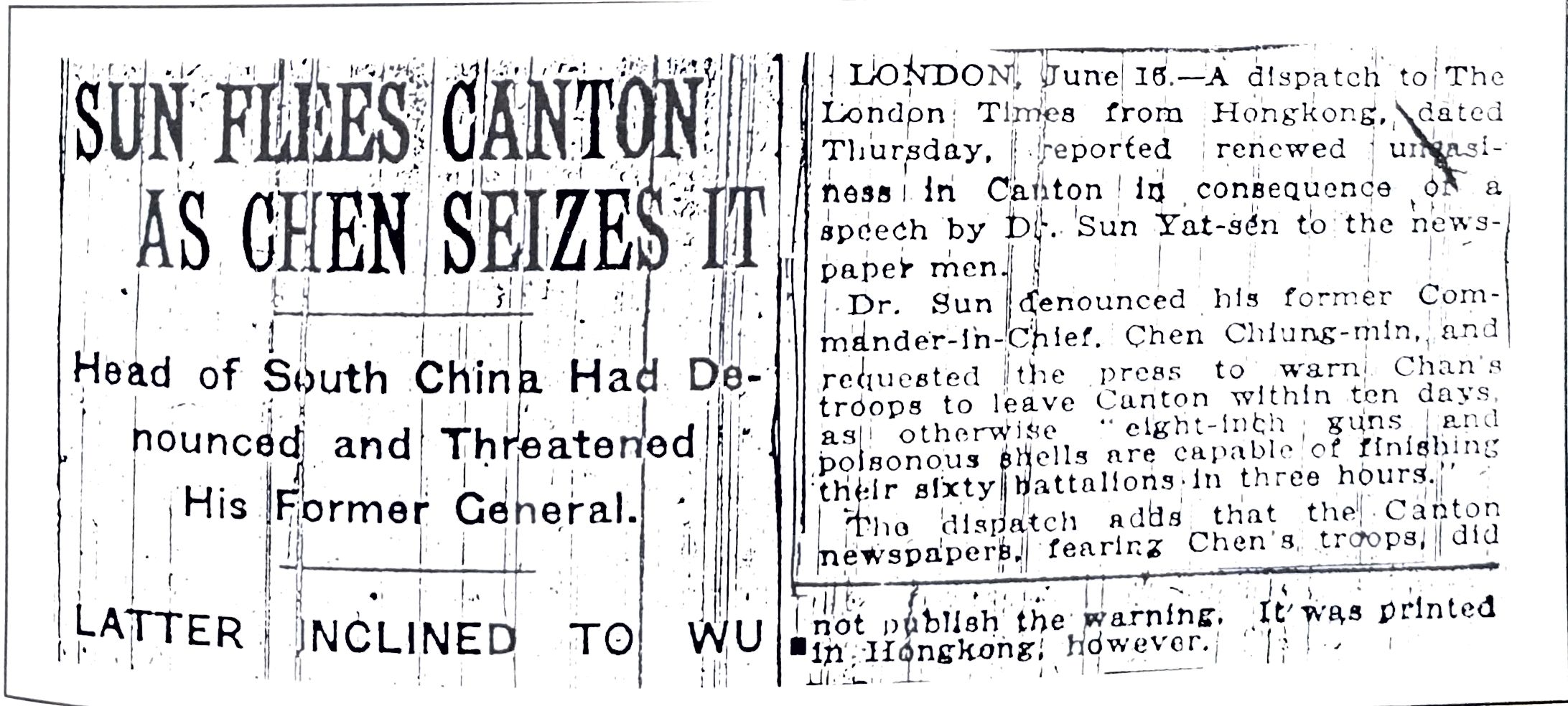
Coverage of the incident by the New York Times

=== Sun's attempted offensive ===
A week after the uprising, Xiangshan and Shunde, counties declared support for Sun Yat-sen, forming an army of 6,000 militia. Chen Yongshan led 2,000 divisions to suppress the Kuomintang rebellion, repelling the armies of both counties.

On July 1, the Northern Expeditionary Army had returned to Guangzhou, seeking to fight a decisive battle with the Guangdong Army. Chen Jiongming attempted to make peace and bribe the navy to fight against the Nationalists, but both attempts were failures. The Guangdong Army was surrounded by enemies on many fronts. However, Wu Peifu's support was already on the way. Xu Chongzhi's army was pushed back into southern Fujian, while Jiangxi was beginning to be attacked by the Zhili armies led by Wu Peifu and Cao Kun. The Jiangxi and Hunan expeditions were pacified, and the attempt to reinstate power over Guangdong forcefully was a failure. Sun Yat-sen fled to Hong Kong, where he then arrived at Shanghai.

== Aftermath ==
In October 1922, Sun Yat-sen reorganized his loyal Northern Expeditionary Army into the Anti-Thief Army, and by 1923, a multi-route offensive took place in Guangdong. Chen's armies were repeatedly defeated, and he was forced into the east of Guangdong. With Sun's return, the Army and Navy Marshal stronghold was established.

=== Reorganization of Guangdong Province ===
Directly after the incident, Ye Ju telegraphed Chen Jiongming to reinstate him as the governor of Guangdong Province. Chen only agreed to be reinstated as Commander-in-Chief of the Guangdong Army, refusing the position as Governor of Guangdong. Chun Chik-yu, a Chinese businessman from Hawaii, was made the Governor of Guangdong.
