= Canton Merchants' Corps Uprising =

1924 armed conflict in China

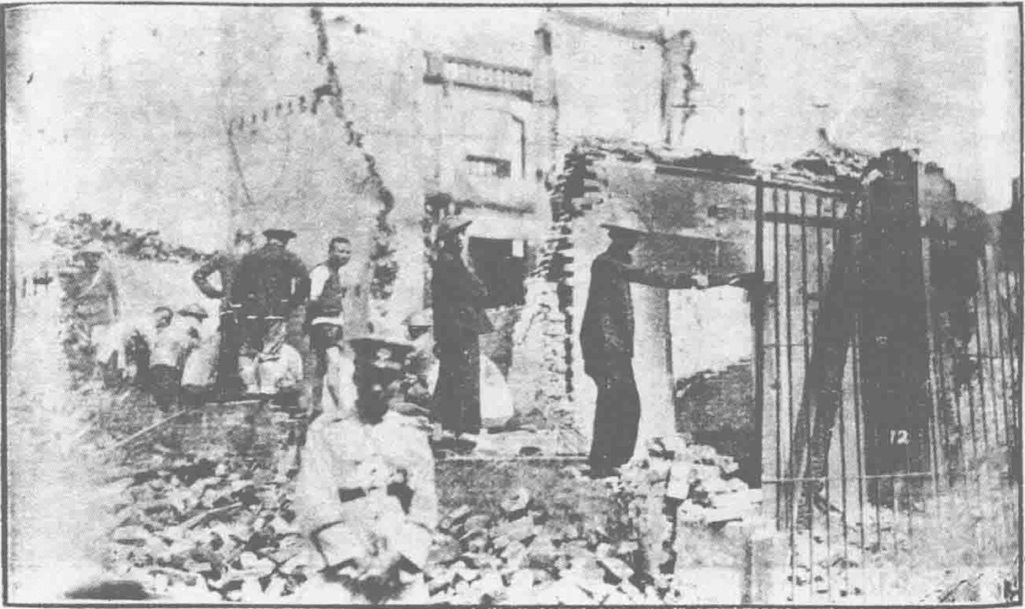
- Remnants of the Thirteen Factories after the fire
Date	August 1924 – October 1924
Location	Guangzhou, China
Result	Government victory

Belligerents
Guangzhou Military Government: Kuomintang; National Revolutionary Army; Supported by: Soviet Union	Canton Merchants' Corps

Commanders and leaders
Sun Yat-sen; Chiang Kai-shek; Hu Hanmin; Liao Zhongkai (Soviet Union) Vasily Blyukher (military advisor)	Chen Lianbo; Chen Gongshou; Zou Jingxian; Li Songshao; Deng Jieshi

Casualties and losses
- 2,000 civilians dead or wounded

Canton Merchants' Corps Uprising
- Traditional Chinese: 廣州商團事變
- Simplified Chinese: 广州商团事变
- Literal meaning: Guangzhou Merchant Corps Incident
Transcriptions
Standard Mandarin
- Hanyu Pinyin: Guǎngzhōu Shāng Tuán Shìbiàn
Yue: Cantonese
- Yale Romanization: gwong2 jau1 seung1 tyun4 si6 bin3
- Jyutping: gwong2 zau1 soeng1 tyun4 si6 bin3

The Canton Merchants' Corps Uprising or Canton Merchants' Corps Incident, also known as Burning of Canton was an armed conflict between the Canton Merchants' Volunteer Corps and the National Revolutionary Army in Guangzhou, China, in late 1924. It ended in a decisive government victory.

== History ==
=== Background ===
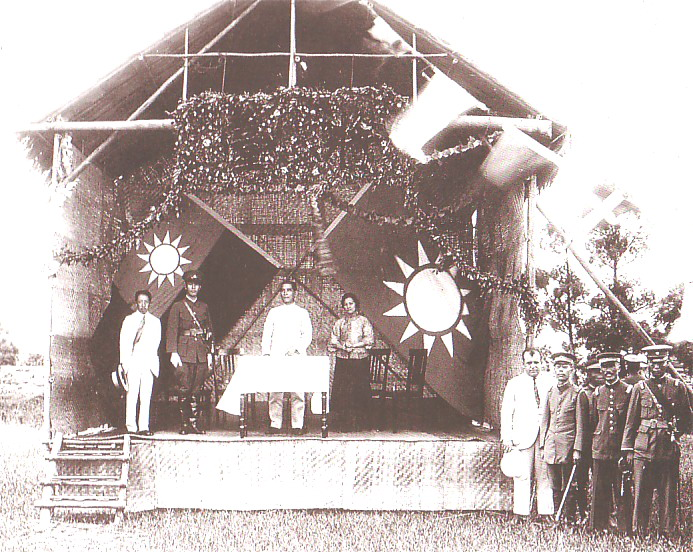
Sun Yat-sen and Chiang Kai-shek in 1924 at the opening of Guangzhou's Whampoa Military Academy on Changzhou

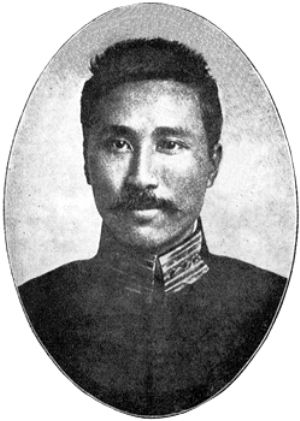
Chen Jiongming, governor of Guangdong

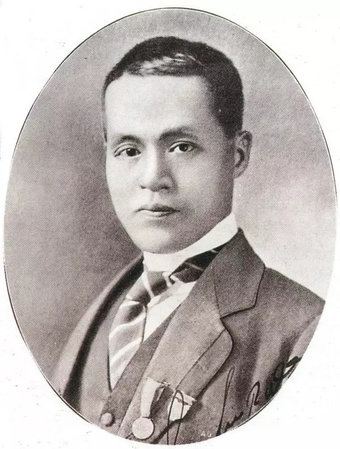
Chen Lianbo, commander of the Canton Merchants' Corps

In 1911, during the period of Xinhai Revolution, society was in chaos. Merchants in Guangzhou (then known as "Canton") established a volunteers corps for self-defense and security. Chen Lianbo (陳廉伯), also known as Chan Lim Pak, was elected commander, and also Director of Finance at the Canton Merchants' Public Safety Organization (廣州粵商公安維持會). Chen supported the volunteer corps and lent funds for the corps to buy weapons. In 1917, Chen, as leader of the CMPSO, continued to provide weapons for the corps. In August 1919, he served as its regimental commander. The size of the corps reached 13,000 in 1924. The Corps maintained a neutral attitude during this period of frequent regime changes in Guangzhou. For their protection of merchants' interests and public security, the Corps were welcomed by many citizens in Guangzhou.

In 1923, allying with the Yunnan and Guangxi cliques, Sun Yat-sen's army defeated Chen Jiongming and occupied Guangzhou. However, Sun broke the promises of his Constitutional Protection Movement to govern along the lines of the old Chinese constitution. Instead, a conscription law was passed and property from temples was confiscated for sale by the state, both angering many citizens. The government also began issuing large sums of money, driving up inflation. The huge military expenses forced the government to re-legalize gambling, drawing considerable ire from the locals.

In January 1924, after its first national conference, the Nationalists entered an alliance with Soviet Union and the Communists. Worrying that Sun would eventually adopt communism in Guangzhou, the merchants changed their attitudes towards the government. In May, the Nationalists announced a law of "unified road ownership" to impose a new tax and caused further dissatisfaction. In August, many strikes happened in Guangzhou. The Canton Merchants' Corps established its "Defense Headquarters", in which Chen was the commander and Deng Jieshi (鄧介石) and Chen Gongshou (陳恭受) vice-commanders. After further negotiations, the government decided to withdraw the road ownership law and the strike was suspended.

=== Uprising ===
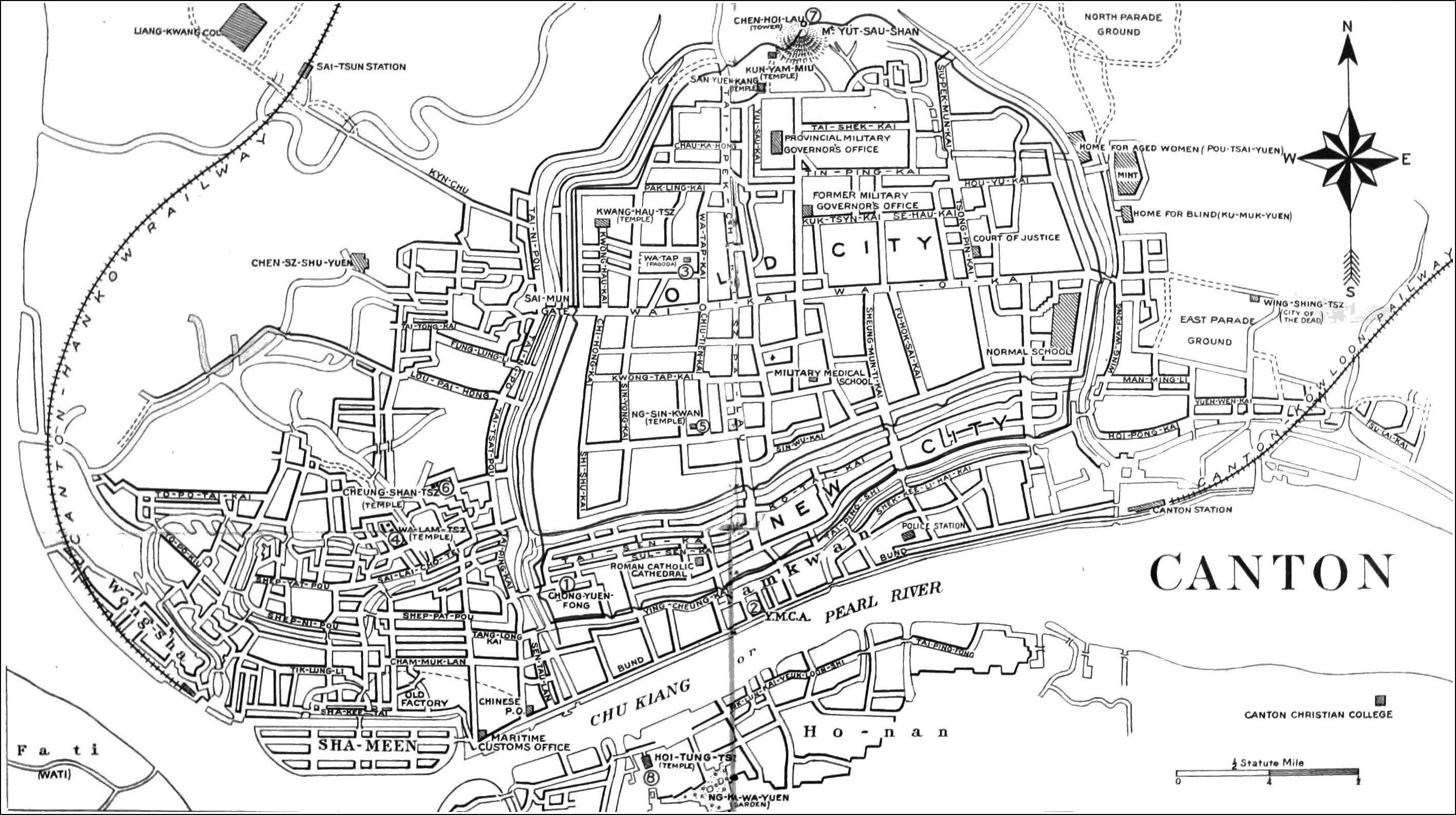
Guangzhou ("Canton") in the 1920s

On August 10, 1924, the British-registered ship Harvard arrived in Guangzhou, carrying some 9000 guns, 40 machine gun, and 3 million rounds of ammunition purchased by the merchants' corps from a British company. The merchants' corps had already been approved for the weapon purchase, but the ship was immediately detained by Chiang Kai-shek's Jianggu (江固艦). The government claimed that both the quantity of weapons and their arrival date did not match what had been stated. On August 12 and 15, about a thousand of the Canton Merchants' Corps marched to Sun's office and appealed to the government to release their weapons. Sun refused and the merchants' corps called a strike all over the Guangdong Province.

On August 24, Sun Yat-sen announced a curfew in Guangzhou, and a warrant was issued for Chen Lianbo's arrest. Two days later, Nanhai, Panyu, Shunde, Taishan, Dongwan, Zengcheng, Xinhui, Qingyuan, Gaoyao, Qujiang, Yangjiang, Luoding, and 20 other counties decided to join the strike in support of the merchants' corps. Inside the Nationalist government, Wang Jingwei and Hu Hanmin disagreed with Sun's proposal of suppression; Liao Zhongkai, who approved it, was forced to resign. On September 4, Sun left Guangzhou for Shaoguan, the base of Northern Expedition, and appointed Hu as the governor . On September 15, Chen Lianbo and Chen Gongshou posted that the merchants' corps had no intention to overturn the government in Guangzhou and would abide by orders from Sun and his government. Hu withdrew their arrest warrants, and he released a portion of the seized weapons to the corps.

On the afternoon of October 10, the Communists appointed labor unions, peasant unions, and younger unions with a total of over 50,000 people, joined for a "Double 10 Warning Day". Zhou Enlai conducted the meeting and sent a public warning to the merchants' corps. After the meeting, the CCP held a demonstration and chanted "Beat the Merchants' Corps, Kill Chen Lianbo, and Support the Revolutionary Government". When the crowd came to South Taiping Road (present-day South Renmin Road), they clashed with the merchants' corps, resulting in the death of more than 20 and another 100 injured. The merchants' corps established defense positions in Xiguan, blockaded thoroughfares, and posted notices that "Sun Yat-sen should retire" and "Beat Sun's government". During that night, Chen Lianzhong, Chen Lianbo's brother, met Deng Jieshi, Li Songshao, and other leaders of the merchants' corps. It was decided to congregate all the soldiers in Xiguan at 5 pm on 14 October and take over governmental agencies the morning after.

On the other side, Sun Yat-sen organized a revolutionary committee on 11 October with Xu Zongzhi (許崇智), Liao Zhongkai, Wang Jingwei, Chiang Kai-shek, Chen Youren, and Tan Pingshan in attendance. On October 15, Chiang led his army of Whampoa Military Academy cadets back to Guangzhou. Together with Sun's other supporters, they swiftly defeated the Merchants' Corp. Chiang was assisted by Soviet advisors, who also supplied him with weapons, while the merchants used weapons purchased from Western countries. Chen had to leave for Hong Kong. During this battle, the business areas in Xiguan were seriously damaged by a great fire.

=== Aftermath ===
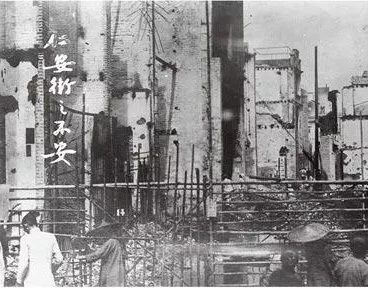
Ruins after burning of the city

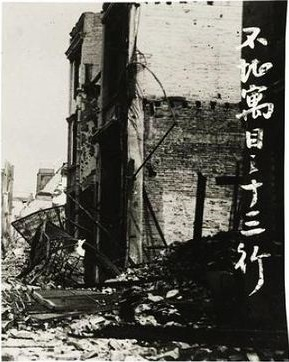
Ruins after burning of the city

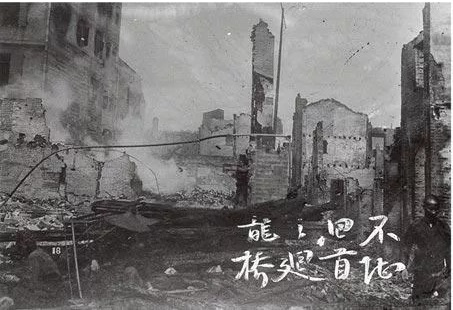
Ruins after burning of the city

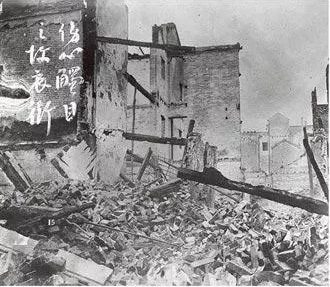
Ruins after burning of the city

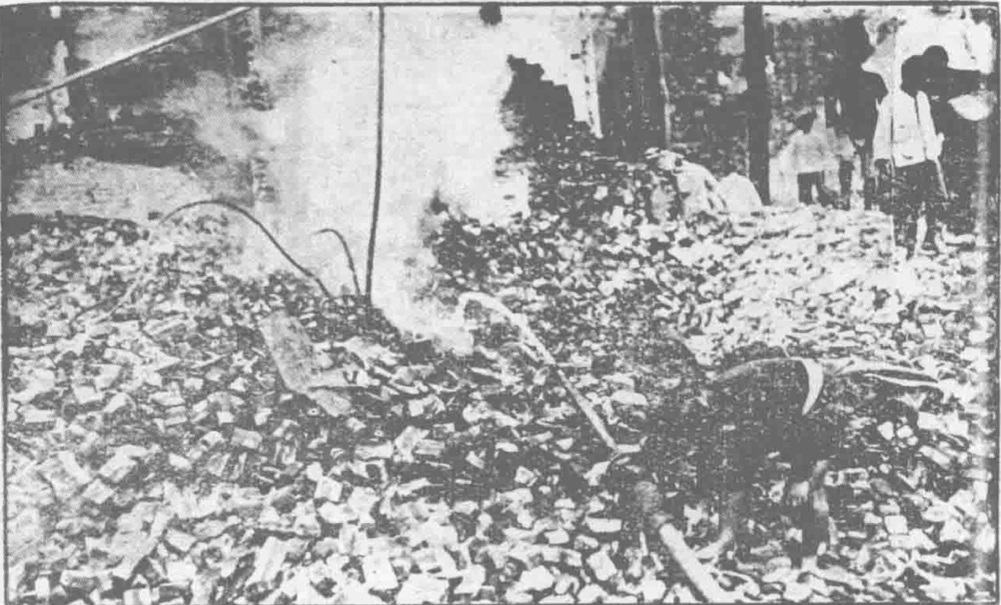
Ruins after burning of the city

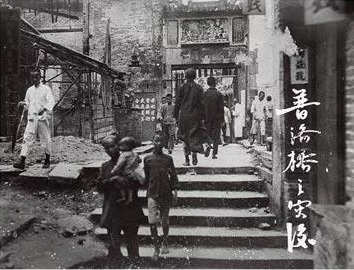
Ruins after burning of the city

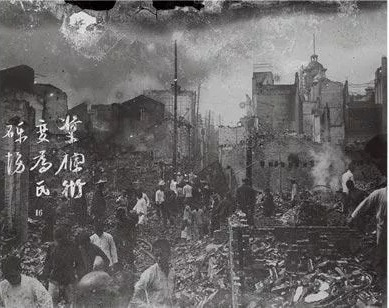
Ruins after burning of the city

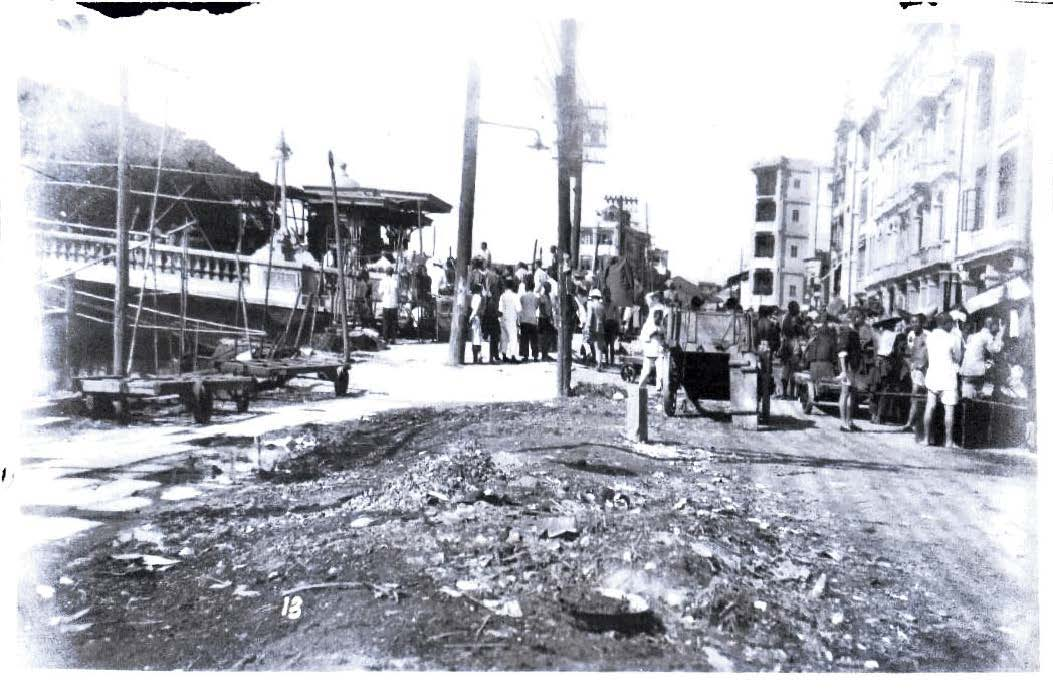
Ruins after burning of the city

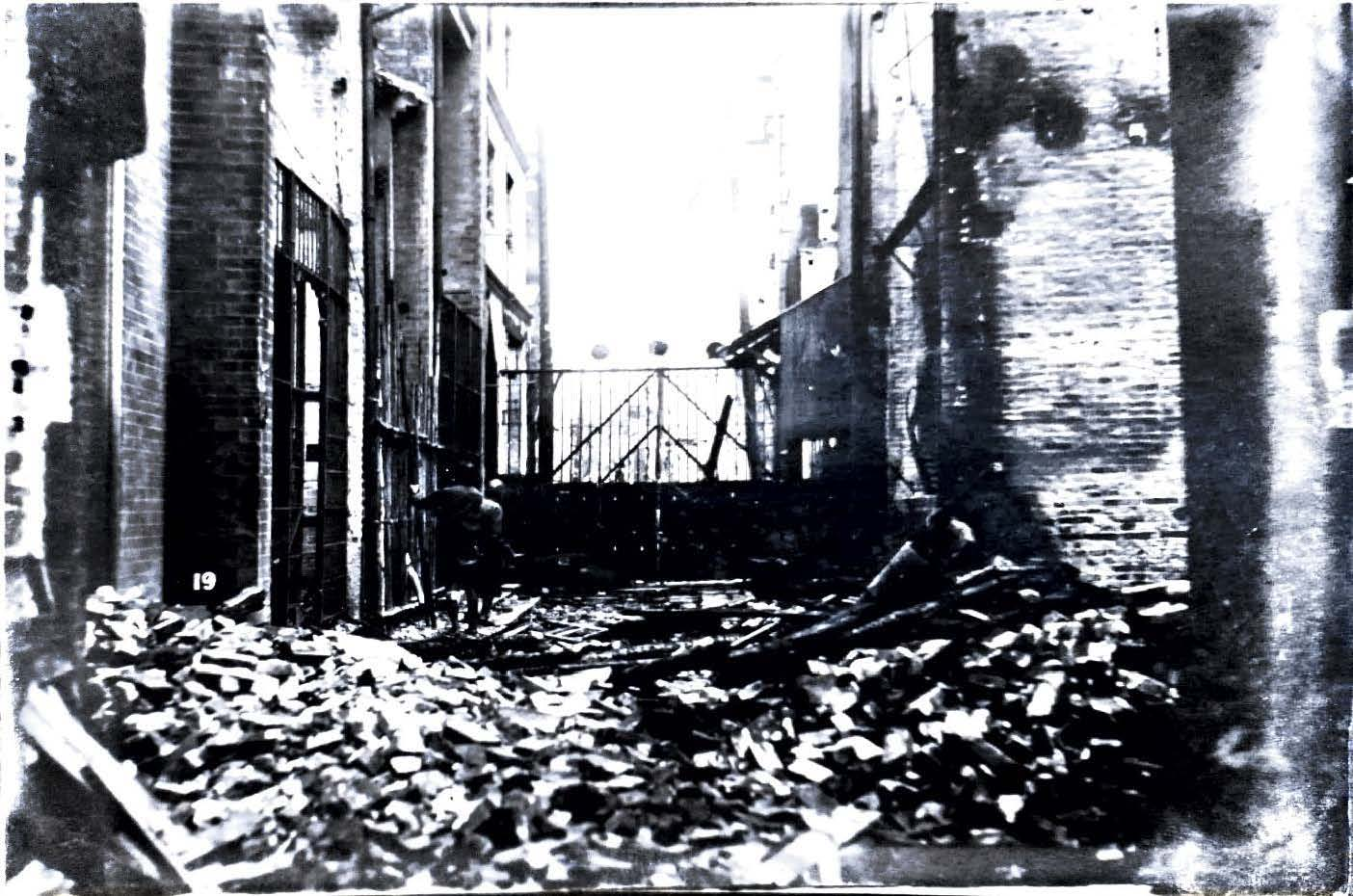
Ruins after burning of the city

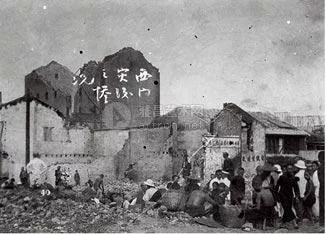
Ruins after burning of the city

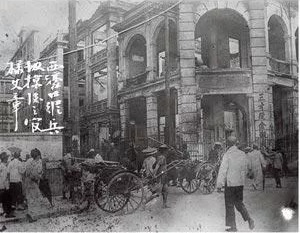
Ruins after burning of the city

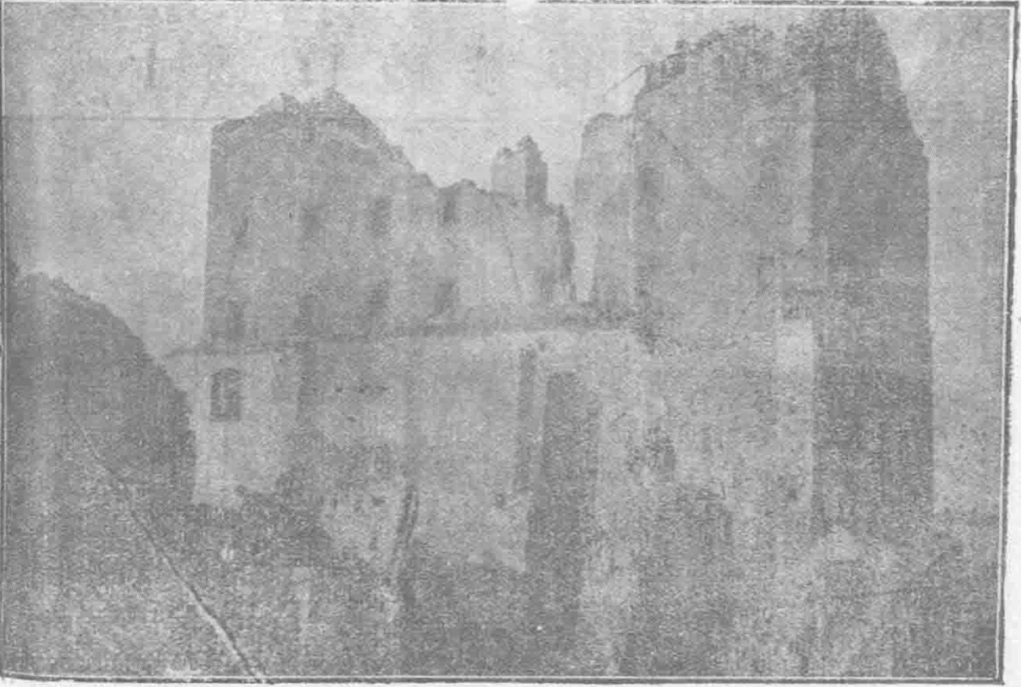
Ruins after burning of the city

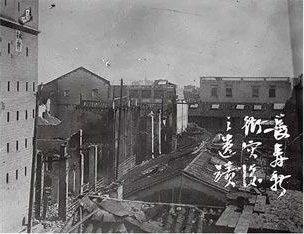
Ruins after burning of the city

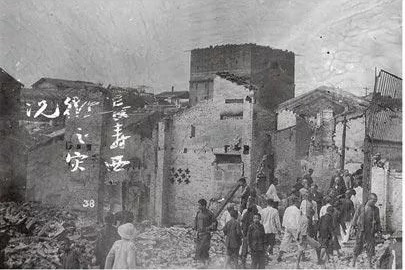
Ruins after burning of the city

Financial losses during this conflict was close to HK$50 million. About two thousand people were killed. Afterwards, the Nationalist government collected protection fees from the merchants, seized their weapons, and levied a $200 fine on each of the participators. The government warned those who failed to comply that the "government cannot be held responsible if soldiers loot or capture anybody". After this incident, some businessmen in Canton tended to support Chen Jiongming instead of Sun. However, with the support of Soviet Union, Sun eventually defeated Chen.

When Sun died in Beijing, the government in Beijing decided to hold a state funeral for him. The Guangzhou Chamber of Commerce (廣州總商會) and Cantonese Autonomous Council (廣東自治會) held a joined protest against the decision.

== See also ==
- Timeline of Guangzhou
