= Guangdong government of the Republic of China =

The Guangdong government of the Republic of China were several governments established by the Kuomintang in the province of Guangdong during the Warlord Era:

- Constitutional Protection junta (1917–1920; 1920–1921)
- Guangzhou government (1921–1922)
- Army and Navy Marshal stronghold (1923–1925)
- Nationalist government (1925–1926), before it moved its capital to Nanjing during the Northern Expedition

== See also ==
- Guangdong Provincial People's Government
