= Canton government of the Republic of China =

Provisional government led by the Kuomintang from 1921 to 1922

Republic of China 中華民國
- 1921–1922
- Flag
- Capital and largest city: Canton
- Common languages: Chinese language
- Demonym: Chinese
- Government: Provisional presidential republic
- Grand President
  - 1921-1922: Sun Yat-sen
- History
  - Established: 2 April 1921
  - Disestablished: 16 June 1922
Preceded by	Succeeded by
Constitutional Protection junta	Army and Navy Marshal stronghold

The Canton government or the Guangzhou government (Chinese: 廣州政府) of the Republic of China (中華民國) was established by Sun Yat-sen in Canton (Guangzhou) after the defeat of the Constitutional Protection junta by the Beiyang government in The First Constitutional Protection Movement. The government was again defeated by the Beiyang government in The Second Constitutional Protection Movement.

The Canton government was the second of three governments that Sun established in Guangzhou, claiming authority over China. Hence, the term sometimes refers to the other two as well.

== History ==
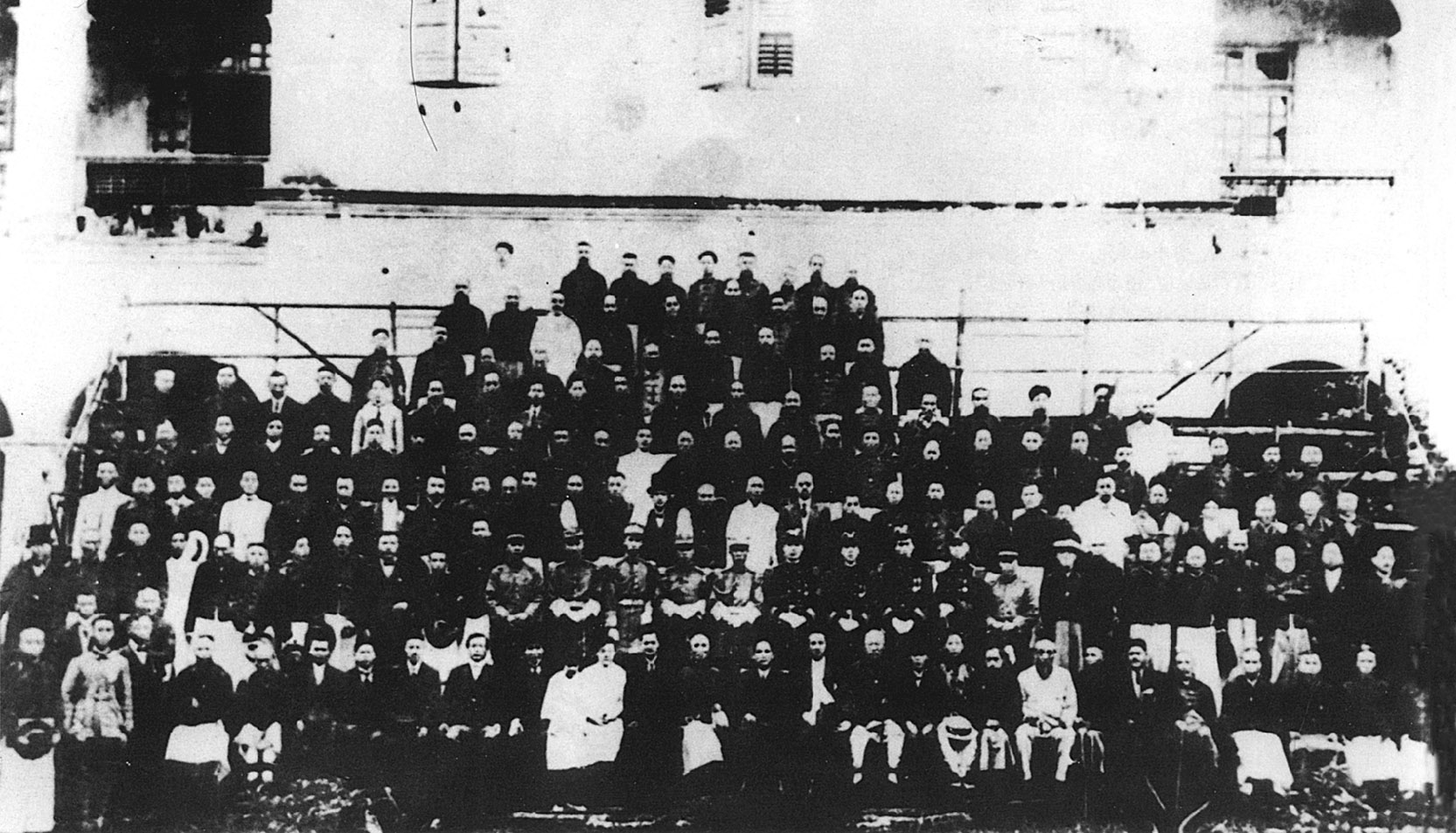
Sun Yat-sen took office as the grand president in Guangzhou on 5 May 1921

After Sun Yat-sen left Guangzhou on 21 May 1918, he returned to Guangzhou on 28 November 1920, reorganized the Constitutional Protection junta, and began the Second Constitutional Protection Movement. On 12 January 1921, the Extraordinary Congress resumed its meeting in Guangzhou. On 2 April, the Extraordinary Congress met and announced the abolition of the southern military government, claiming to form the government of the Republic of China. Sun Yat-sen was elected "Great President" on 7 April, and he took office in Guangzhou on 5 May.

After his election, Sun Yat-sen issued separate statements at home and abroad, and wrote an open letter to Xu Shichang, President of the Beiyang government, persuading him to resign voluntarily. At the same time, he published his new government central personnel list:

- Minister of Foreign Affairs Wu Tingfang
  - Wu Chaoshu
- Minister of Finance Tang Shaoyi
  - Liao Zhongkai
- Secretary of the Army Chen Jiongming
- Minister of the Interior Chen Jiongming
- Secretary of the Navy Tang Tingguang
- Chief of Staff Li Liejun
- Secretary-General Ma Junwu
- General Senate and Chief Civil Officer Hu Hanmin
- President Xu Shaozhen
- Political Minister Hu Hanmin
- Governor of Guangdong Chen Jiongming

After Sun Yat-sen took office, the main force was the Northern Expedition to unify China. However, Sun Yat-sen's idea of the Northern Expedition was opposed by Chen Jiongming, who had risen to prominence in Guangzhou through the development of the Guangdong Army. Chen Jiongming advocated joint provincial autonomy – proposed by Hunan warlord Tan Yankai – and a federal system. Chen Jiongming advocated "suspending the military", implementing inter-provincial autonomy to secure territory, "establishing the provincial constitution first," and building Guangdong. But Sun Yat-sen believed that "inter-provincial autonomy" recognized the status quo of the regime of the Beiyang government, and in essence would still be a disguised warlord regime. Sun Yat-sen implemented the strategy of unifying the country by force, and eventually clashed with Chen Jiongming.

In April 1922, Wu Peifu secretly sent someone to Guangdong to contact Chen Jiongming, asking Chen Jiongming to oppose Sun Yat-sen's Northern Expedition. In May, Wu Peifu had a secret appointment with Chen Jiongming. Wu Peifu expelled Xu Shichang in the north, and Chen Jiongming overthrew Sun Yat-sen in the south. The first step was to reinstate Li Yuanhong, and use the abolition of the government to disarm Cao Kun and the warlords of the provinces. If the failure was also the victim of Li Yuanhong, let the Congress urgently elect Wu Peifu and Chen Jiongming as the president and vice president. Wu Tingfang and Cai Yuanpei were the transitional president and vice president. According to the wishes of Cao Kun and Wu Peifu, the northern warlords issued energizations one after another, demanding that the North and South presidents abdicate at the same time. On 31 May 1922, 203 members of the Senate and House of Representatives of the old Congress issued a declaration announcing that they would exercise parliamentary powers on the same day, abolish the North and South governments, and form a united government.

After the end of the First Zhili–Fengtian War, the situation became increasingly sinister. On 3 June 1922, Ye Ju declared martial law in Guangzhou. Wu Peifu and Chen Jiongming used Li Yuanhong's reinstatement as an excuse to say that the purpose of protecting the constitution had been achieved, and they demanded that Sun Yat-sen and Xu Shichang step down at the same time. Since Sun Yat-sen once issued a political declaration during a war to defend the law, he promised that if the Beiyang veteran Xu Shichang and his Beiyang government step down and disband, he will also step down. Cai Yuanpei, Hu Shi, Gao Yihan and more than two hundred celebrities from all walks of life who supported the inter-provincial autonomy jointly called Sun Yat-sen and the Guangzhou Extraordinary Congress to fulfill his promise. At the same time, Wu Peifu also separately invited Sun Yat-sen, Wu Tingfang, Li Liejun and others to go north to reconnect with the country and create an atmosphere of "national unity."

Chen Jiongming took the final step on 13 June 1922, convening a meeting with Ye Ju and others in Shilong to discuss the military deployment of the rebellion. In the middle of the night on 15 June, senior generals of the Guangdong Army convened a meeting and decided to launch a military operation to remove Sun from power. On the same day, Ye Ju mobilized troops in Baiyun Mountain to prepare for bombardment of the Guanyin Mountain Presidential Palace and Yuexiu Tower. On 16 June, the Cantonese military first called and notified the bombardment of the Guanyin Mountain Presidential Palace. Sun Yat-sen left on the Yongfeng ship under the escorts of Jiang Zhongzheng and Chen Ce, and retired from Guangdong in early August to Shanghai, where Lu Yongxiang held influence. The government of the Republic of China in Guangzhou collapsed. The second constitutional protection movement failed.

After the June 16 Incident, Sun Yat-sen continued to serve as the extraordinary president.

On 19 January 1923, Sun Yat-sen handed over power to Hu Hanmin, Li Liejun, Wei Bangping, Xu Chongzhi, and Zou Lu to collectively take full powers as president. On 21 February, Sun Yat-sen arrived in Guangzhou again and set up the Army and Navy Marshal stronghold.
