= Constitutional Protection junta =

Provisional government led by the Kuomintang from 1917-1920 and 1920-1921

Republic of China 中華民國
- 1917–1920; 1920–1921
- Flag

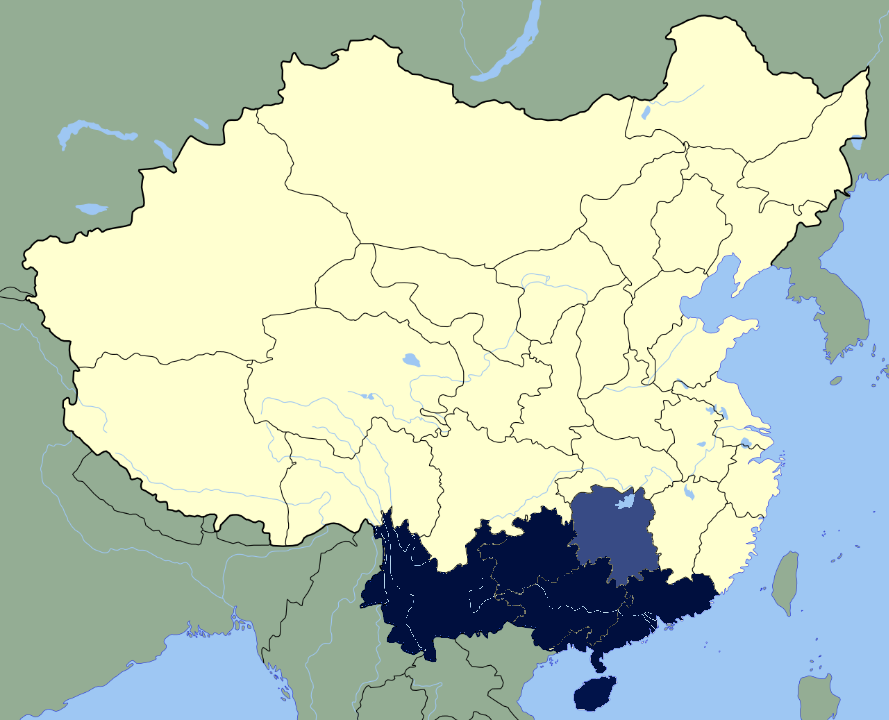
- Provincial members of the Constitutional Protection Movement shown in dark blue; former member (light blue)
- Capital and largest city: Guangzhou
- Common languages: Chinese language
- Demonym: Chinese
- Government: Provisional military government
- Generalissimo
  - 1917–1918: Sun Yat-sen
  - 1920–1921: Sun Yat-sen
- Chairman of Presidium
  - 1918–1920: Cen Chunxuan
  - 1920–1921: Sun Yat-sen
- History
  - Established: 1 September 1917
  - Dissolved: 24 October 1920
  - Reestablished: 28 November 1920
  - Disestablished: 2 April 1921
Preceded by	Succeeded by
Provisional government	Guangzhou government

The Constitutional Protection junta (Chinese: 護法軍政府) of the Republic of China (Chinese: 中華民國) was established by Sun Yat-sen in Guangzhou after the death of the Beiyang government President Yuan Shikai and in the wake of the Warlord Era. The government was defeated by the Beiyang government in The First Constitutional Protection Movement.

The Constitutional Protection junta was the first of three governments that Sun established in Guangzhou, claiming authority over China. Hence, the term Guangzhou government sometimes refers to all three.

== History ==
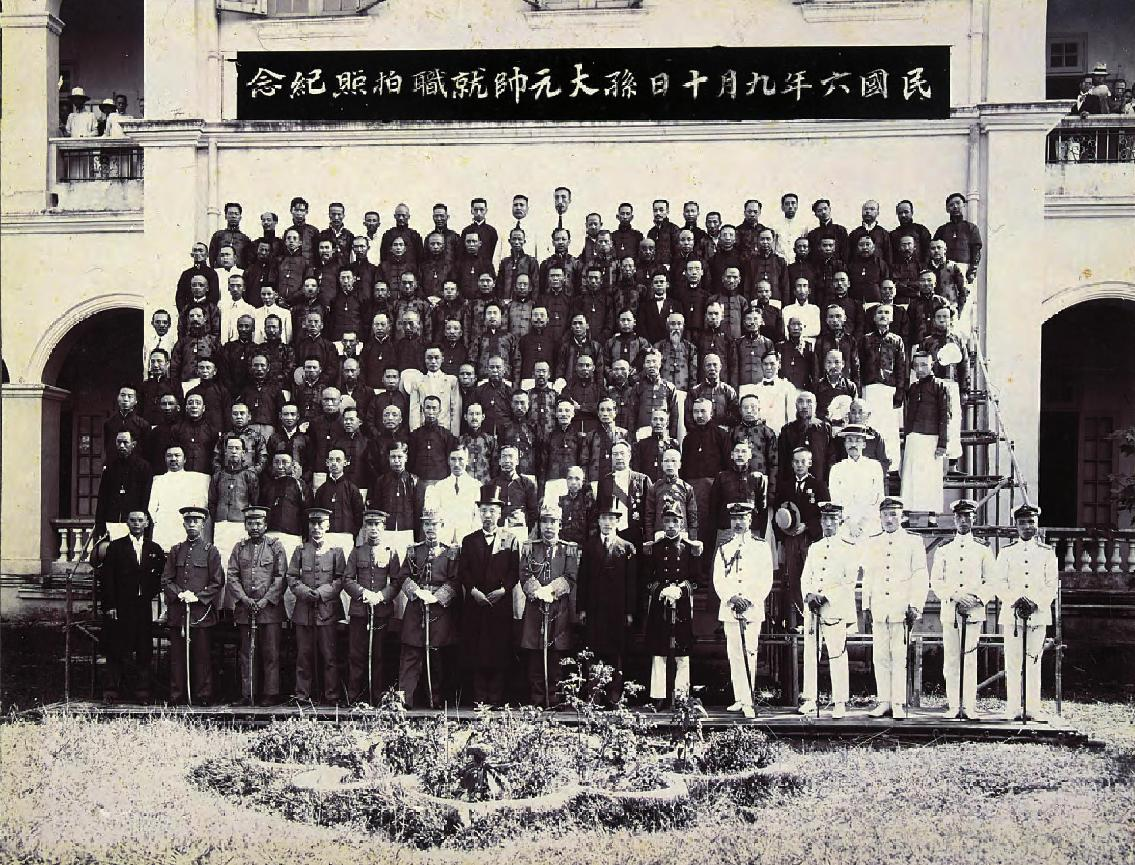
The inauguration ceremony Sun Yat-sen on 10 September 1917

During the Constitutional Protection Movement, on 25 August 1917, the number of members of the first Congress of the Republic of China went south to more than 150. Due to insufficient quorum, no formal meeting could be convened. According to Sun Yat-sen's proposal, it was decided to convene an extraordinary meeting of the National Assembly in Guangzhou. On 25 August, the Extraordinary Congress opened, and it was decided, in order to maintain the "Provisional Constitution", that a military government would be formed in Guangzhou, with one army and navy marshal of the Republic of China and three marshals to exercise the administrative power of the Republic of China.

On 1 September 91 members of the Extraordinary Congress voted 84 votes to elect Sun Yat-sen as the Generalissimo (or General Marshal) of the military government. Later, Tang Jiyao of the Yunnan clique and Lu Rongting of the Old Guangxi clique were elected as Marshal. In addition, Wu Tingfang was selected as Minister of Foreign Affairs, Tang Shaoyi was Chief Finance Officer (but did not take office), Cheng Biguang was Chief Navy Officer, and Hu Hanmin was Chief Transportation Officer. Sun Yat-sen took office on 10 September, with Li Liejun as chief of staff, Li Fulin as commander-in-chief of the army, Xu Chongzhi as staff officer, and Chen Jiongming as commander-in-chief of the First Army, and the military government was established. Announcing that Duan Qirui and others were rebellious and vowed to follow the Northern Expedition. Under Sun Yat-sen's call, the constitutional protection war officially began.

At the end of 1917, Lu Rongting, Tang Jiyao, Mo Rongxin and others jointly convened the "Republic of China Association of Constitutional Protection Provinces" with Tang Shaoyi. In January 1918, in addition to the military government, the Southwestern warlords formally organized a power center, the "Joint Conference of All Provinces to Protect the Law," with Cen Chunxuan as the chief representative of the meeting, advocating the recognition of the Beiyang government's legal system and the formation of a coalition government to seek compromise with the Beiyang warlords. On 10 April 1918, the Extraordinary Congress, adhering to the wishes of the Southwestern Warlords, passed the "Republic of China Military Government Organization Outline Amendment" and decided to reorganize the military government and change the general marshal system to the presidential collegiate system; Sun Yat-sen resolutely opposed this decision.

On 4 May 1918, Sun Yat-sen angrily resigned to the Extraordinary Congress and energized him to expose the crime of the Southwestern warlord's sabotage of the Constitutional Protection Movement. Through reorganization on 20 May 1918, the general marshal system was abolished and the generals were replaced by seven presidents. Tang Shaoyi, Tang Jiyao, Sun Yat-sen, Wu Tingfang, Lin Baoyi, Lu Rongting and Cen Chunxuan were elected as co-presidents. Sun Yat-sen's power in Guangzhou was emptied, and he was forced to resign from his post as general marshal. The various departments of Guangxi and Yunnan controlled the Congress and reorganized the Constitutional Protection junta. On 21 May, Sun Yat-sen left Guangzhou and went to Shanghai, which was controlled by Jiang Zhongzheng. Later, the Guangzhou military government took Cen Chunxuan as the chairman amongst the presidents. The First Constitutional Protection Movement came to an end.

In the mid-1920s, the Guangzhou military government appeared to have infighting, and the British-backed Guangxi and Dian groups fought for power. Cen Chunxuan resigned by telegram on 24 October, announcing the abolition of the military government and obedience to the Beijing government. Sun Yat-sen returned to Guangzhou on 28 November and resumed his post as General Marshal and President of the Army and Navy, and reorganized the southern military government to continue the constitutional protection movement. On 12 January 1921, the Extraordinary Congress resumed its meeting in Guangzhou. On 2 April, the Extraordinary Congress met to abolish the southern military government and organize the Guangzhou government, marking the end of the southern military government. On 7 April, Sun Yat-sen was elected as the extraordinary president, and he took office in Guangzhou on 5 May. The Second Constitutional Protection Movement officially began.
