= Army and Navy Generalissimo's Headquarters =

Provisional military government led by the Kuomintang from 1923-1925

Army and Navy Generalissimo's Headquarters 陸海軍大元帥大本營
- 1923–1925
- Flag
- Capital and largest city: Guangzhou
- Common languages: Chinese language
- Demonym: Chinese
- Government: Provisional military government
- Army and Navy Marshal
  - 1923-1925: Sun Yat-sen
  - 1925: Hu Hanmin
- History
  - Established: 21 February 1923
  - Disestablished: 1 July 1925
Preceded by	Succeeded by
Guangzhou government	Nationalist government

The Army and Navy Generalissimo's Headquarters (Chinese: 陸海軍大元帥大本營) of the Republic of China (Chinese: 中華民國) was established by Sun Yat-sen in Guangzhou after the defeat of the Guangzhou government by the Beiyang government in The Second Constitutional Protection Movement. The government was reorganized into the Nationalist government.

This government, sometimes called the Guangzhou Revolutionary Government, was the last of three governments that Sun established in Guangzhou, claiming authority over China. Hence, the term "Guangzhou government" sometimes refers to all three.

== History ==
After Chen Jiongming's subordinates launched the June 16 Incident in 1922, Sun Yat-sen left under the escorts of Jiang Zhongzheng and Chen Ce on the Yongfeng ship. In early August, he retreated from Guangdong and settled in Shanghai, where Lu Yongxiang's sphere of influence was. The Guangzhou government collapsed and the Second Constitutional Protection Movement failed. Chen Jiongming occupied Guangzhou and served as commander-in-chief.

On January 4, 1923, Sun Wentong telegraphed Chen Jiongming and bought the Dian Army of Yang Ximin and Gui Army of Liu Zhenhuan, and joined forces with Xu Chongzhi's Guangdong Army, who supported Sun Wen, to form the East and West "Thief Army" to jointly attack Chen Jiongming. On January 15, Chen Jiongming announced that he would go down the field, withdraw from Guangzhou the next day, and retreat to Dongjiang in Huizhou. On February 21, Sun Yat-sen returned to Guangzhou to set up the Army and Navy Generalissimo's Headquarters, and reorganized the military government.

== Government ==
=== Organization ===
It had a secretariat, military service department, legal affairs bureau, audit bureau, accounting department, general affairs department, the Ministry of Interior, the Ministry of Finance, the Ministry of Military and Political Affairs, the Ministry of Construction, the Ministry of Foreign Affairs, the Ministry of the Navy, the Department of Staff, and the Dali Academy.

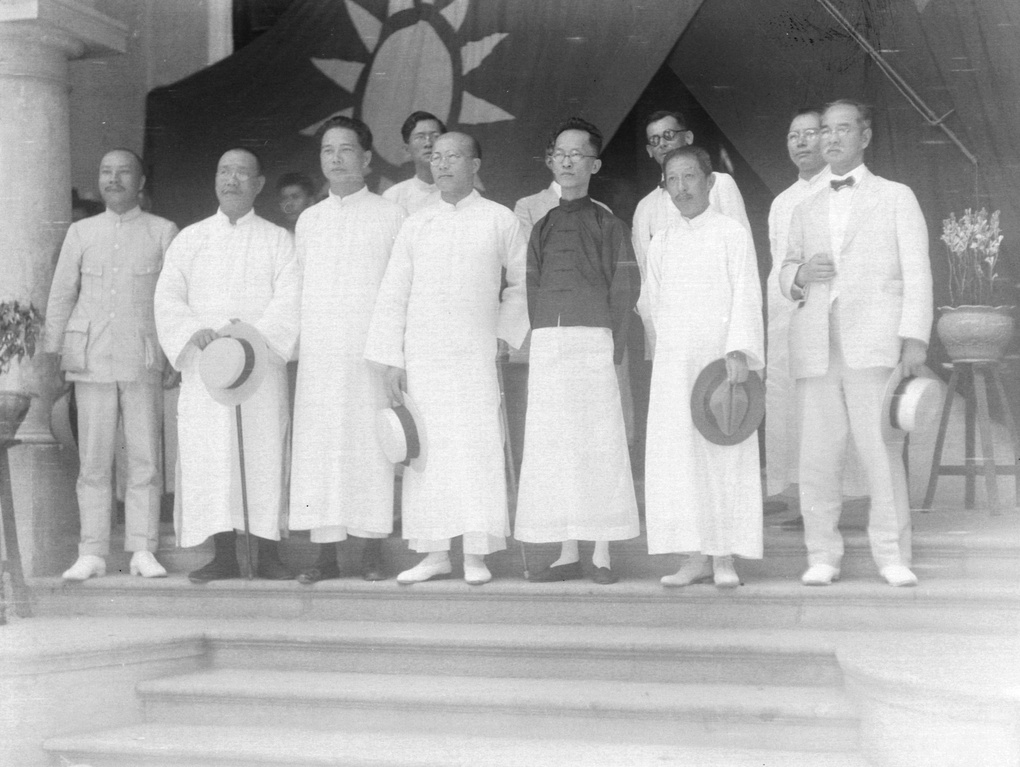
Kuomintang Canton political council in 1925.

=== Leaders ===
The top leader of the base camp of the Army and Navy Generalissimo's Headquarters was Sun Yat-sen, Chairman of the Kuomintang (KMT). Sun Yat-sen implemented the party-state system, and the Kuomintang ruled the government as a one-party state.

In 1924, the Kuomintang held the First National Congress of the Kuomintang in Guangzhou. After that, the Whampoa Military Academy was established and the National Revolutionary Army, led by the Kuomintang, was formed to lead the army with the party.

=== Office location ===
The office of the headquarters of the Army and Navy Generalissimo's Headquarters was located at Dongsha Street, Textile Road, Haizhu District, Guangzhou, where the current General Marshal's Mansion is located.

=== Property ===
There were the following types during official production:

1. The alluvial land on the Pearl River—most of the sites south of Yide Road fell into this category. The use of these lands by ordinary people was called occupation and construction of official shortages, that is, to build houses here without registering with the government;
2. the flag properties left by the Qing court, also known as sub-streets, were mainly in the east of Renmin North Road and the west of Jiefang North Road;
3. Yimin City was a temporary housing area where immigrants from outside the West Gate to the Rainbow Bridge relocated. Most of these residents did not have legal real estate deeds (so these industries were defined as official properties).

Public property included temples, academies, ancestral halls, guild halls, etc., which were properties held by the government and were classified as public property. However, the public property situation was also more complicated:

- Some public properties were built on official land, which was allocated to land by the Qing government in the past, such as Sanyuan Palace in Yuexiu Hill and Chunyang Temple in Henan;
- Henan Hoi Tong Monastery was originally the Pingnan Palace built by the feudal king Shang Zhixin. Later, it was donated to Haizhu Temple in the name of his wife;
- Tandu Temple at the foot of Yuexiu Mountain (after today's Guangdong Science Museum) was originally built by Shang Kexi as a monk assigned to the King of Jingnan.

== Military ==
During this period, the provincial capital of Guangdong was controlled by Liu Zhenhuan's Gui army, Yang Ximin's Dian army, and Tan Yankai's Hunan army. Among them, Xiguan and the Old Town were occupied by the Hunan and Dian troops, the Northeast Pass was occupied by the Gui Army, and the Henan area was presided over by the local Henan Wang Li Fulin. In March 1924, the Hunan Army and the Yunnan Army jointly established an office to organize a joint inspection team to maintain public security in Guangzhou.

At this time, the expenditures of the various military forces were huge, and the government auctioned off local government and public properties to increase its financial resources.
