= Lin Baoyi (admiral) =

Chinese admiral (1864–1930)

- 林葆懌
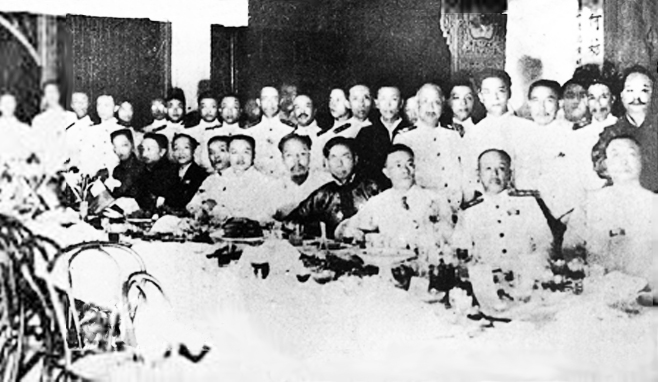
- Sun Yat-sen welcomes defecting Beiyang Navy officers in 1917. Lin is second to the right in the front row.

Personal details
- Born: 20 December 1864 Minhou County, Fujian, Qing China
- Died: 14 September 1930 (aged 65) Shanghai, Republic of China

Military service
- Allegiance: Qing Dynasty (Republic of China (1912–1949)) Republic of China
- Branch/service: Imperial Chinese Navy; Republic of China Navy
- Commands: Admiral
Lin Baoyi
- Traditional Chinese: 林葆懌
- Simplified Chinese: 林葆怿
Transcriptions
Standard Mandarin
- Hanyu Pinyin: Lín Bǎoyì
- Wade–Giles: Lin^{2} Pao^{3}i^{4}
Eastern Min
- Fuzhou BUC: Lìng Bó̤-ĭk

Lin Baoyi (traditional Chinese: 林葆懌; simplified Chinese: 林葆怿; 20 December 1864 – 14 September 1930) was a Chinese admiral during the late Qing dynasty and the Warlord Era of the Republic of China.

== Biography ==
Born in Minhou County, he was educated at the local naval academy and was sent to Britain for further studies. Lin rose to become an admiral in the Beiyang fleet during the Qing dynasty and continued to serve in the Republic. In 1917, reacting against Duan Qirui's dominance over the Beiyang government, he defected with his ships to Sun Yat-sen's rival Constitutional Protection government in South China. For his actions, he was made a member of the governing committee and navy minister. Soon a split emerged within the committee with him siding with the Old Guangxi clique against Sun. Sun's forces, led by Chen Jiongming, defeated him and his Guangxi allies in 1920. He later rejoined the Beiyang government.

Lin died in Shanghai in 1930.
