= Second Revolution (Republic of China) =

1913 revolt in southern China

- Part of the aftermath of the First Revolution and the anti-Yuan struggle
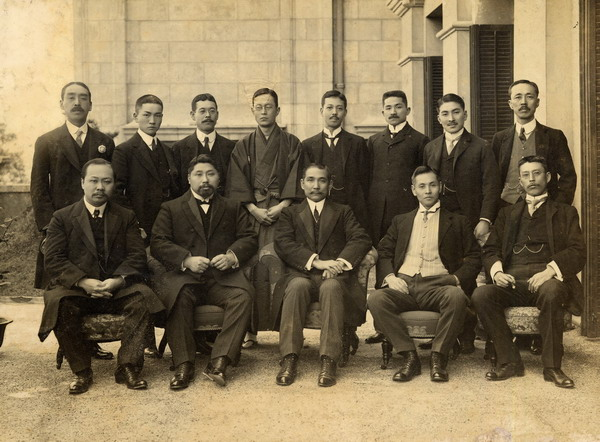
- In March 1913, Sun Yat-sen, Huang Xing, and others met at the Yokohama Specie Bank in Shanghai to discuss opposing Yuan Shikai.
Date	12 July – 12 September 1913 (62 days)
Location	China
Result	Beiyang victory: Kuomintang flees to Japan

Belligerents
Beiyang government; Beiyang Army; Shandong Army; Sichuan Army; Yunnan Army; Guizhou Army; Shaanxi Army; Zhejiang Army	Kuomintang; Jiangxi Anti-Yuan Army; Jiangsu Anti-Yuan Army; Shanghai Anti-Yuan Army; Guangdong Anti-Yuan Army; Anhui Anti-Yuan Army; Sichuan Anti-Yuan Army; Fujian Anti-Yuan Army

Commanders and leaders
Yuan Shikai; Li Yuanhong; Duan Zhigui; Feng Guozhang; Li Dingxin; Long Jiguang; Hu Jingyi; Cai E; Tang Jiyao; Zhang Xun; Zhang Fenghui; Li Chun; Zhu Rui; Ni Sichong	Sun Yat-sen; Li Liejun; Huang Xing; Chen Qimei; Jiang Yiwu (executed); Zhang Peijue (executed); Fang Yuanzhao (executed); Bo Wenwei; Xiong Kewu; Hu Hanmin; Chen Jiongming; Tan Yankai; Sun Daoren

Strength
Unknown	~10,000

The Second Revolution (Chinese: 二次革命; pinyin: Èrcì Gémìng) was a failed 1913 revolt by the governors of several southern Chinese provinces and supporters of Sun Yat-sen's Kuomintang (KMT) against the Beiyang government of the Republic of China, led by Yuan Shikai. It was quickly defeated by Yuan's armies and led to the continued consolidation of Yuan's powers as President of the Republic of China.

In the 1912 election, the KMT won a majority of seats to the National Assembly, and its leader Song Jiaoren was to be the premier. Song was assassinated on 22 March 1913, likely on Yuan's orders, after which Sun urged an immediate military expedition. The military campaign was postponed as Yuan began to dismiss republican governors from their offices. On 12 July, Li Liejun declared the independence of Jiangxi, and five other provinces and Shanghai followed suit. Huang Xing arrived in Nanjing and organized an anti-Yuan force, but his poorly organized troops were quickly crushed by soldiers of the Beiyang Army. Nanjing was captured on 1 September 1913, and all six provinces soon surrendered. Sun and Huang fled to Japan, and the Second Revolution concluded in failure.

The failed revolution is named Guichou because it occurred in 1913, the stem-branch year of guǐ-chǒu (癸丑) in the sexagenary cycle of the traditional Chinese calendar, just as the Xinhai Revolution occurred in 1911, the year of xīn-hài (辛亥).

== Background ==
Kuomintang leader Song Jiaoren was assassinated in March 1913. Some people believe that Yuan Shikai was responsible, and although it has never been proven, he had already arranged the assassination of several pro-revolutionist generals. Animosity towards Yuan grew. In April he secured a Reorganization Loan of 25 million pounds sterling from Great Britain, France, Russia, Germany and Japan, without consulting the parliament first. The loan was used to finance Yuan's Beiyang Army.

On May 20, 1913, Yuan concluded a deal with Russia that granted Russia special privileges in Outer Mongolia and restricted Chinese right to station troops there. Kuomintang members of the Parliament accused Yuan of abusing his rights and called for his removal. On the other hand, the Progressive Party (Chinese: 進步黨; pinyin: Jìnbùdǎng), which was composed of constitutional monarchists and supported Yuan, accused the Kuomintang of fomenting an insurrection. Yuan then decided to use military action against the Kuomintang.

There were several underlying reasons for the Second Revolution besides Yuan's abuse of power. First was that most revolutionary armies from different provinces were disbanded after the establishment of the Republic of China, and many officers and soldiers felt that they were not compensated for toppling the Qing dynasty. These factors gave rise to much discontent against the new government among the military. Secondly, many revolutionaries felt that Yuan Shikai and Li Yuanhong were undeserving of the posts of presidency and vice presidency, because they acquired the posts through political maneuvering rather than participation in the revolutionary movement. Lastly, Yuan's use of violence (such as Song's assassination) dashed the Kuomintang's hope of achieving reforms and political goals through electoral means.

== Events ==
=== Yuan Shikai's actions against KMT supporters ===
In the beginning of May, Li Chun led the 8th Division from Baoding to Wuhan and brought his crack troops to reinforce Shanghai. On June 9, President Yuan removed KMT supporter Li Liejun as Governor of Jiangxi, and replaced him with Vice President Li Yuanhong. Some modern scholars have rehabilitated Li Liejun in this light.

On June 13, Military Governor of Guangdong Hu Hanmin (Kuomintang) was appointed to a position in Tibet, and was replaced by Chen Jiongming. On June 30, Anhui Governor Bo Wenwei (KMT) was also dismissed. On the same day, Li Yuanhong made mass arrests of underground party leaders in Wuhan. At the behest of Jiujiang garrison commander Chen Tingxun, Yuan sent the Beiyang Army 6th Division under command of Li Chun into Jiangxi on July 3rd.

=== Southern Provinces declare independence ===
On July 12 Li Liejun returned to Jiangxi, and at Hukou, proclaimed the independence of Jiangxi.

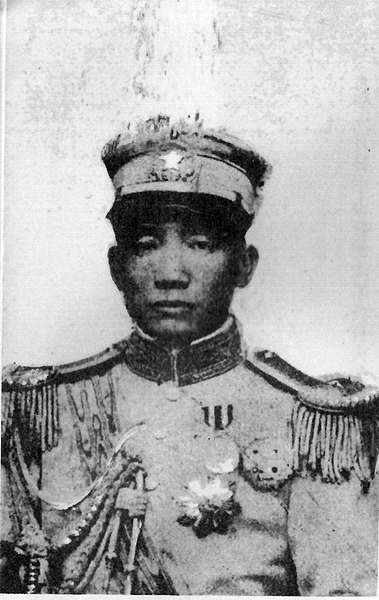
Portrait of Xiong Kewu

On July 15, Huang Xing arrived at Nanjing, organized an anti-Yuan force, and forced Jiangsu Governor Cheng Dequan to declare independence. Cheng acceded, and then fled to Shanghai under a pretext of medical issues.

On July 17, Anhui governor Bo Wenwei, declared his province's independence. On the 18, Chen Qimei announced Shanghai's independence. On July 18, Chen Jiongming declared Guangdong's independence. On July 19, Sun Daoren and Xu Chongzhi announced Fujian's independence over telegram.

On July 22, anti-Yuan forces were defeated around Xuzhou by the Beiyang Army 2nd Division led by Feng Guozhang and Zhang Xun and retreated to Nanjing. From the 22nd to 28th, anti-Yuan forces attempted to capture the Jiangnan Arsenal, but the Beiyang Army was able to resist the attack with assistance from the Beiyang Navy. After this battle, Zhenjiang and Suezhou rescinded their declarations of independence.

On July 26, Long Jiguang's forces headed towards Zhaoqing where Li Yaohan of the Zhaoqing Army joined him on the 30th. On August 3, his army entered Sanshui District.

On July 31, Ni Sichong's Beiyang force surrounded Fengtai and captured the surrounding Huaiyuan County. On August 2, Fengtai fell to the Beiyang forces.

On August 4 in Chongqing, Xiong Kewu declared Sichuan independent. Yuan Shikai ordered Yunnan's military governor and warlord Tang Jiyao and his army into Sichuan to suppress the rebellion. However, Long Jiguang, governor of Guangzhou, would succeed in defeating Xiong Kewu's forces ahead of Tang's.

On August 5, Beiyang forces captured Shou County. On August 7, Hu Wantai revolted against Anhui governor Bei in support of Yuan, and 4 days later took control of the provincial capital of Anqing.

On the 8th, He Haiming declared Nanjing's independence for a second time, however that evening the declaration was cancelled. The next day, Sun Daoren rescinded Fujian's independence via telegram message.

On August 11, He Haiming again declared independence in Nanjing, and led 2000 soldiers in a bloody revolt against the Beiyang Army. Two days later, the pro-Yuan Ji Army led by Long Jiguang captured Guangzhou. That same day, Tan Yankai took to telegram to rescind Hunan's declaration of independence, the Beiyang Navy took Wusong, and anti-Yuan forces in Jiading were dispersed.

On August 18, a Beiyang Army under command of Li Chun captured Nanchang. The next day, Ni Sichong's Beiyang forces entered Hefei. He then reached Anqing on the 25th, took Wuhu on the 28th, and sent a detachment of troops led by Hu Wantai to capture Huizhou, which they did on the 29th. On September 1, Zhang Xun's Wuwei Corps captured Nanjing.

On September 11, Xiong Kewu abandoned Chongqing, dispersed his forces, assumed an alias, and fled. The next day, Tang Jiyao and his Ji Army entered Chongqing and the Second Revolution was defeated in its entirety.

== Aftermath ==
The KMT's "Second Revolution" ended in failure as Yuan's troops achieved complete victory over revolutionary uprisings. Provincial governors with KMT loyalties who remained willingly submitted to Yuan. Because those commanders not loyal to Yuan were effectively removed from power, the Second Revolution cemented Yuan's power.

Just after the end of the revolt, Sun Yat-sen fled to Japan for a second time, and re-established the Revive China Society.

In January 1914, China's Parliament was formally dissolved. To give his government a semblance of legitimacy, Yuan convened a body of 66 men from his cabinet who, on 1 May 1914, produced a "constitutional compact" that effectively replaced China's provisional constitution. The new legal status quo gave Yuan, as president, practically unlimited powers over China's military, finances, foreign policy, and the rights of China's citizens. Yuan justified these reforms by stating that representative democracy had been proven inefficient by political infighting.

After his victory, Yuan reorganized the provincial governments. Each province was supported by a military governor (都督) as well as a civil authority, giving each governor control of their own army. This helped lay the foundations for the warlordism that crippled China over the next two decades.

During Yuan's presidency, a silver "dollar" (yuan in Chinese) carrying his portrait was introduced. This coin type was the first "dollar" coin of the central authorities of the Republic of China to be minted in significant quantities. It became a staple silver coin type during the first half of the 20th century and was struck for the last time as late as the 1950s. They were also extensively forged.

== See also ==
- 1913 in China
- Xinhai Revolution
- Constitutional Protection Movement
