= Ye Ju =

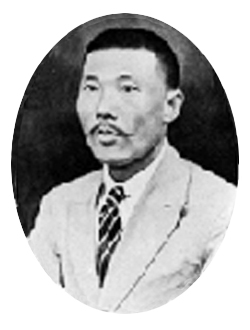
- Traditional Chinese: 葉擧
- Simplified Chinese: 叶举
Transcriptions
Standard Mandarin
- Hanyu Pinyin: Yè Jǔ
- Wade–Giles: Yeh Chü

Ye Ju (1881–1934), formerly romanized as Yeh Chü, was a Chinese Nationalist general and governor of Guangdong Province.

== Life ==
Ye was born in 1881.

He graduated from the Guangdong Military Academy and first served under Long Jiguang. After Long's fall, he served with Chen Jiongming.

After the fall of Yuan Shikai, amid China's Warlord Era, Sun Yat-sen's Nationalist rival government in Guangzhou vied for legitimacy with the Zhili Clique's Beiyang government in Beijing. With Ye's assistance, Chen Jiongming had restored Sun's government through the Yuegui Wars with the Old Guangxi Clique but by 1922 they were of two minds about whether to remain a regional power or to press towards a reunification of China through a northern expedition. Under Chen's regime, Ye oversaw Guangzhou (then known as "Canton"), which he had recovered on Chen's behalf. Sun was unable to dismiss Chen but threatened General Ye, saying he had "8-inch guns with poisonous shells capable of entirely finishing off sixty battalions in three hours", and ordered him to withdraw his men from Guangzhou within ten days. In response, Ye assaulted the Presidential Palace on 15 or 16 June 1922. Sun had already fled but his wife narrowly escaped shelling and rifle fire before meeting him on the gunboat Yongfeng where they were soon joined by Chiang Kai-shek. They hid it among the Whampoa anchorage's foreign ships, which Chen could not risk striking, and held out for about 50 days, shelling Chen's positions and attempting to restore Sun to power. Conceding his lack of support, they reached Hong Kong on a British ship and then took a steamer to Shanghai. Sun then summoned the aid of members of the New Guangxi Clique, who drove Chen and Ye into eastern Guangdong.

Ye died of an illness in late January, 1934.

== See also ==
- Warlord Era
