= Guangxi Clique =

Guangxi Clique may refer to:

- Old Guangxi clique, a clique of Chinese warlords by Lu Rongting up to the early 1920s
- New Guangxi clique, a clique of Chinese warlords led by Li Zongren from the mid 1920s
- Guangxi Army of the Qing dynasty
