= Chen Jiongming =

Chinese revolutionary and federalist (1878–1933)

- 陳炯明
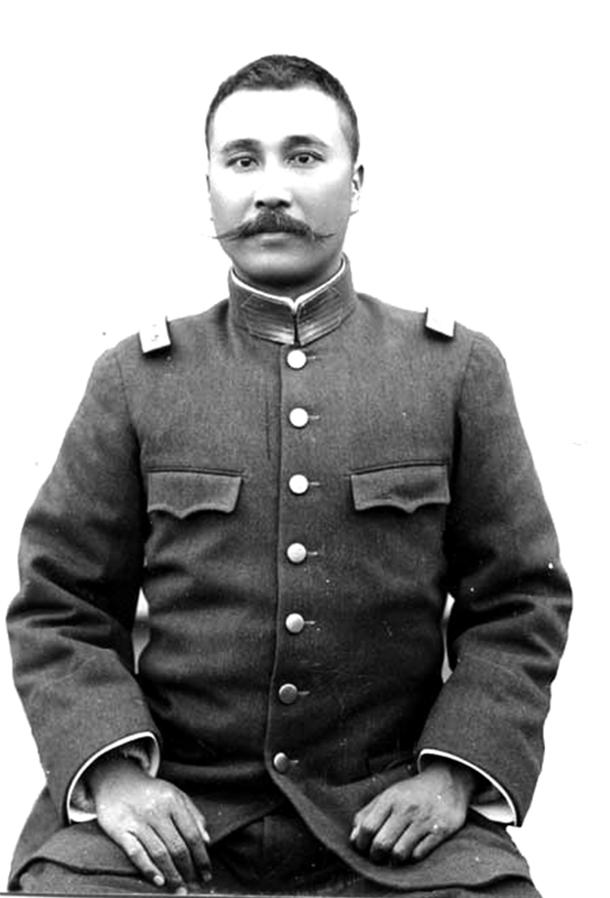
- Chen c. 1920

Civil Governor of Guangdong
- In office 2 November 1920 – 21 April 1922

Administrator of the Constitution Protection Region of Southern Fujian
- In office 31 August 1918 – 12 August 1920

Acting Military Governor of Guangdong
- In office December 1911 – April 1912

Member of the Guangdong Provincial Assembly
- In office 14 October 1909 – 9 November 1911
- Constituency: Huizhou

Personal details
- Born: 18 January 1878 Haifeng, Guangdong, Qing Dynasty
- Died: 22 September 1933 (aged 55) British Hong Kong
- Party: China Zhi Gong Party (1925–1933)
- Other political affiliations: Tongmenghui (c. 1906–1909 – 1914)

Military service
- Commands: Commander-in-chief, Xun Army (1911–1913); Commander-in-chief, Guangdong Army (1917–1925)
- Battles/wars: Xinhai Revolution; Second Revolution; National Protection War; Warlord Era; Constitutional Protection Movement; Guangdong–Guangxi War; 16 June Incident; Campaigns against KMT forces

Chinese name
- Traditional Chinese: 陳炯明
- Simplified Chinese: 陈炯明
Transcriptions
Standard Mandarin
- Hanyu Pinyin: Chén Jiǒngmíng
- Wade–Giles: Ch'en^{2} Chiung^{3}-ming^{2}
- IPA: [ʈʂʰə̌n tɕjʊ̀ŋmǐŋ]
Hakka
- Romanization: Chin Genˋ-min
- Pha̍k-fa-sṳ: Chhṳ̀n Kuén-mìn
Yue: Cantonese
- Yale Romanization: Chàhn Gwíng-mìhng
- Jyutping: Can^{4} Gwing^{2}-ming^{4}
Southern Min
- Hokkien POJ: Tân Kéng-bêng
- Teochew Peng'im: Dang^{5} Guang^{2}-mêng^{5}

Chen Jiongming (Chinese: 陳炯明; pinyin: Chén Jiǒngmíng; Wade–Giles: Ch'en Chiung-ming; 18 January 1878 – 22 September 1933) was a Chinese statesman, military leader, and revolutionary who was a key figure in the federalist movement during the Warlord Era of the Republic of China. He served as civil governor of Guangdong province from 1920 to 1922 and commander-in-chief of the Guangdong Army. His vision of a democratic China, unified peacefully through a federal system, ultimately brought him into conflict with Sun Yat-sen, who favoured a centralized state unified by military force.

Born in Haifeng, Guangdong, Chen was educated in law and politics before joining the revolutionary Tongmenghui. He was elected to the Guangdong Provincial Assembly in 1909, where he became a prominent reformer, and played a pivotal role in the Xinhai Revolution in Guangdong. As an administrator in southern Fujian (1918–1920) and later as governor of Guangdong, Chen initiated wide-ranging social, political, and economic reforms aimed at modernizing the region and establishing democratic institutions. His administration in Guangdong, which established Canton as China's first modern municipality and enacted a provincial constitution, was intended to be a model for a future federated China.

Chen's federalist ideals and "anarcho-federalist blueprint" for reform led to an irrevocable break with Sun Yat-sen, culminating in the June 16 Incident of 1922, which saw Chen's forces surround the Presidential Palace in Canton. The incident precipitated Sun's turn towards an alliance with the Soviet Union and a reorganization of the Kuomintang (KMT) along Leninist lines. Consequently, Chen was vilified in KMT as a counter-revolutionary warlord. Defeated by KMT forces backed by Soviet arms and advisers, Chen spent his later years in British Hong Kong, where he co-founded the China Zhi Gong Party and continued to advocate for federalism until his death in 1933. While his historical portrayal remains contested, many contemporary and modern scholars recognize him as a progressive idealist and a proponent of a democratic, federal China, viewing his federalist movement as a significant, constitutive part of the New Culture and May Fourth Movements.

== Early life and education ==
Chen Jiongming was born on 18 January 1878 in Haifeng, Guangdong, to a landlord family of moderate means. His given name was Jie (捷), meaning "victory", as news of his birth coincided with his father earning the first literary degree, xiucai. Twenty-one years later, when Chen himself obtained the xiucai degree in 1899, he adopted the name Jiongming (炯明), meaning "to illuminate brightly". After entering the Academy of Law and Political Science in Canton, he took the courtesy name Jingcun (競存), "to compete for survival", reflecting his exposure to Social Darwinism.

Chen's family owned land in Haifeng county, a primarily rural area in East Guangdong noted for salt production and proximity to the port of Swatow. He spoke Haifeng Hokkien, Hakka, Cantonese, and, in adulthood, Mandarin with a Haifeng accent. His father, the only son of a gentry family, died when Chen was less than three years old. After his grandfather's death a year later, the family's fortunes declined. In 1899, the same year he became a xiucai, Chen married Huang Yun (黃雲), the daughter of his school principal; they would have eight children.

The aftermath of the Boxer Rebellion accelerated the reform movement in China. In 1904, Chen entered Haifeng's new Short-term Normal School for training modern teachers. After graduating, he was rejected for a teaching position by local gentry who considered him to have "revolutionary ideas". In the summer of 1906, he enrolled in the Academy of Law and Political Science (廣東法政學堂) in Canton, graduating at the top of his class in July 1908. The academy, part of the Late Qing reforms, trained future officials in Western learning and constitutional theory, with many Japanese and Chinese instructors who had studied in Japan.

Even as a student, Chen was active in local reform. During vacations in Haifeng, he established an association to promote local self-government and a society to eradicate opium smoking. He gained a reputation for leadership by successfully impeaching a corrupt magistrate in Huizhou, donating the thousand-dollar reward he received to a local benevolent association. In February 1908, he persuaded over thirty young men from his village to swear a secret oath at the shrine of Wen Tianxiang in Haifeng, pledging support for a national revolution.

After graduating, Chen returned to Haifeng and in early 1909 founded the Haifeng zizhi bao (Haifeng Self-Government Gazette), using it to advocate for social reforms. He was deeply influenced by revolutionary literature, particularly Zou Rong's The Revolutionary Army, which advocated for the overthrow of the Qing dynasty and the establishment of a Chinese republic modelled on the United States. This ideal of a federated republic became a lifelong pursuit for Chen.

== Reformer and revolutionary (1909–1913) ==
=== Guangdong Provincial Assembly ===
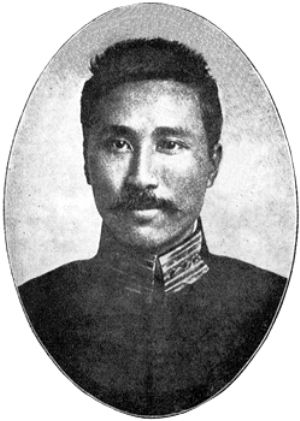
Chen Jiongming

In 1909, as part of the Qing government's constitutional reforms, elections were held for provincial assemblies. Chen, then just over the minimum age of thirty, was elected as one of ninety-four members of the Guangdong Provincial Assembly, representing Huizhou fu. Convening on 14 October 1909, the assembly elected Chen a resident member and chair of the legal matters committee, and he quickly became a leading progressive voice.

During the assembly's first session, Chen was a strong advocate for the complete suppression of gambling, a major source of provincial revenue but also a cause of widespread social problems. He successfully mobilized public pressure against the practice, and the newly appointed Governor-General Zhang Mingqi agreed to a total ban effective 30 March 1911. This major political victory, celebrated with a grand parade in Canton, was noted by the American consul general as a significant assertion of the assembly's power.

Chen also proposed the elimination of summary executions (jiudi zhengfa) and advocated for girls' schools and elected school boards. In a notable instance of his opposition to Manchu privilege, he successfully argued against converting a parade ground into a Manchu commercial market, stating that there should be no distinction between Manchu and Han under the law. In late 1909, Chen was one of three Guangdong delegates to a conference of provincial assemblies in Shanghai that called for the early inauguration of a national parliament. However, already committed to revolution, he did not join the subsequent appeal in Beijing.

=== Prelude to revolution ===
Chen likely joined the Tongmenghui (Revolutionary Alliance) around 1909 and was involved in planning the Canton New Army Uprising of 12 February 1910. After the uprising failed, he fled to British Hong Kong. There, along with Liu Shifu and others, he formed the Chinese Assassination Corps (支那暗殺團). This anarchist-inspired group, which Chen sponsored, aimed to eliminate high-ranking Qing officials through acts of political assassination, operating independently of the Tongmenghui.

Despite his revolutionary activities, Chen returned to Canton for the Provincial Assembly's sessions in 1910, where he continued to push for reforms. In December 1910, he and his allies established a newspaper, Ke bao (Assent Gazette), ostensibly for the anti-gambling movement but secretly a revolutionary organ. The paper was shut down by authorities in April 1911 for articles deemed "derogatory toward the Throne".

=== Revolution of 1911 ===
Chen participated in the planning of the Second Guangzhou Uprising of 27 April 1911 (also known as the Yellow Flower Mound revolt). He used his position as a senator to set up secret cells and store munitions. The uprising, led by Huang Xing, was poorly coordinated and brutally suppressed; Chen escaped to Hong Kong. After the revolt, the Assassination Corps targeted Admiral Li Zhun and Governor-General Zhang Mingqi. On 25 October 1911, following the Wuchang Uprising, the Corps successfully assassinated the Manchu General Feng Shan (鳳山) in Canton, an act that paralyzed the Qing authorities and significantly aided the revolutionary cause in Guangdong.

Flag used by Chen Jiongming's army, with a well-field system symbol

By mid-October 1911, Chen had been elected commander-in-chief of a revolutionary army, the Xun Army (循軍), in Hong Kong. He established headquarters in Danshui, Haifeng, and launched an uprising in Huizhou on 3 November. His army, largely composed of local peasants, adopted a flag with the ancient well-field system symbol, signifying "land to the tiller". After initial resistance, the Qing commander surrendered Huizhou on 8 November. This victory was pivotal; on 9 November, Guangdong declared independence without further bloodshed. Hu Hanmin was elected military governor, and Chen was elected vice military governor on 18 November.

=== First Republican administration in Canton (1911–1913) ===
When Hu Hanmin left for Nanjing with Sun Yat-sen in December 1911, Chen became acting military governor of Guangdong. He faced immense challenges, including financial instability and unruly "citizen soldiers". He convened a new provincial assembly, which included ten female representatives, to address these issues. American Consul General F.D. Cheshire praised Chen for restoring peace and order, suppressing gambling and opium smoking, and closing brothels. Chen initiated an ambitious modernization program for Canton, tearing down city walls to build new roads and planning new business centres and public parks.

In April 1912, after Sun relinquished the provisional presidency to Yuan Shikai, he visited Canton and reinstated Hu Hanmin as governor. Chen briefly withdrew to Hong Kong but returned in May after Hu, needing his support, appointed him Chief of the General Pacification Bureau, responsible for military affairs and internal security.

== Second Revolution and Constitutional Protection Movement (1913–1920) ==
=== First campaign against Yuan Shikai and exile (1913–1915) ===
As Yuan Shikai consolidated power in Beijing, tensions with the Kuomintang grew. In June 1913, Yuan dismissed KMT-aligned military governors, including Hu Hanmin, and appointed Chen in his place. When Li Liejun declared Jiangxi's independence on 12 July, sparking the Second Revolution, Chen declared Guangdong independent on 18 July and took up arms against Yuan.

Public opinion in Guangdong favoured peace, and Yuan's forces, led by Long Jiguang, invaded the province. Facing betrayals from his own generals and with his troops unwilling to fight, Chen was forced to flee Canton on 4 August 1913. He was deported from Hong Kong by British authorities sympathetic to Yuan and went into exile in Malaysia and Singapore. During his exile, Sun Yat-sen reorganized the KMT into the Chinese Revolutionary Party (中華革命黨), demanding an oath of personal loyalty from members. Chen, along with Huang Xing and other prominent revolutionaries, found this unacceptable and refused to join.

=== Restoration of the republic and hufa movement (1915–1918) ===
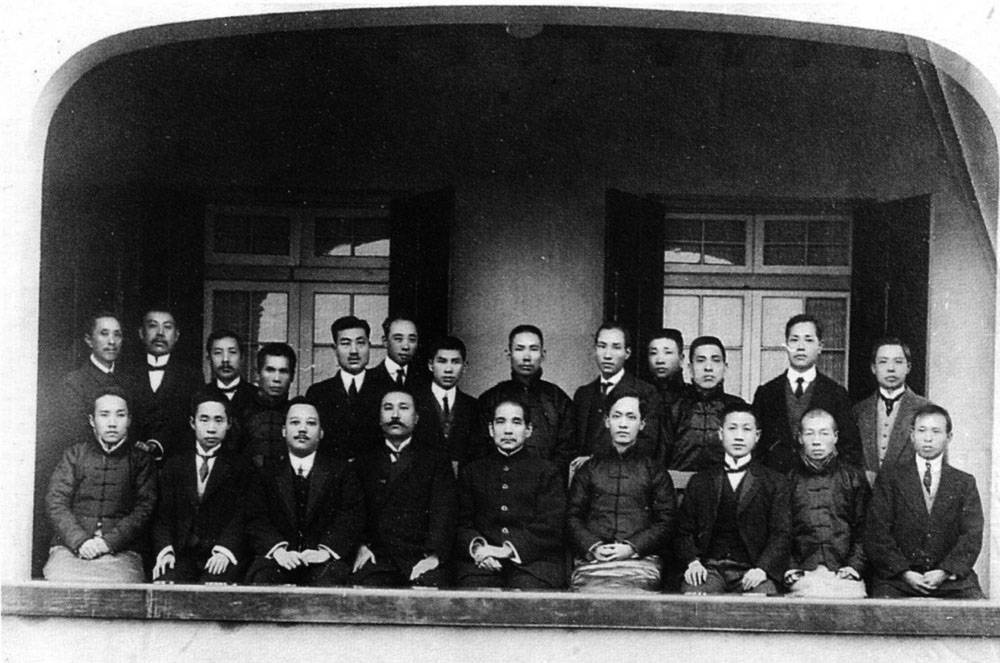
Republican leaders in Shanghai, December 1916. Chen Jiongming is fourth from the left in the front row, to the left of Sun Yat-sen (centre).

When Yuan Shikai declared his intention to restore the monarchy in December 1915, Chen returned to China and raised an army in the East River districts of Guangdong to fight against Yuan's supporter, Long Jiguang, in the National Protection War. Yuan died in June 1916, and Li Yuanhong became president. In the summer of 1917, after Prime Minister Duan Qirui engineered the dissolution of parliament, southern provinces launched the Constitutional Protection Movement (hufa yundong). Chen returned to Canton with Sun Yat-sen and was appointed commander of twenty battalions of garrison troops. In December 1917, Chen led the Guangdong Army into Fujian province to counter the forces of the pro-Beijing military governor. After a successful campaign, he captured Zhangzhou on 31 August 1918, where he would remain for the next two years.

=== Administration in southern Fujian (1918–1920) ===
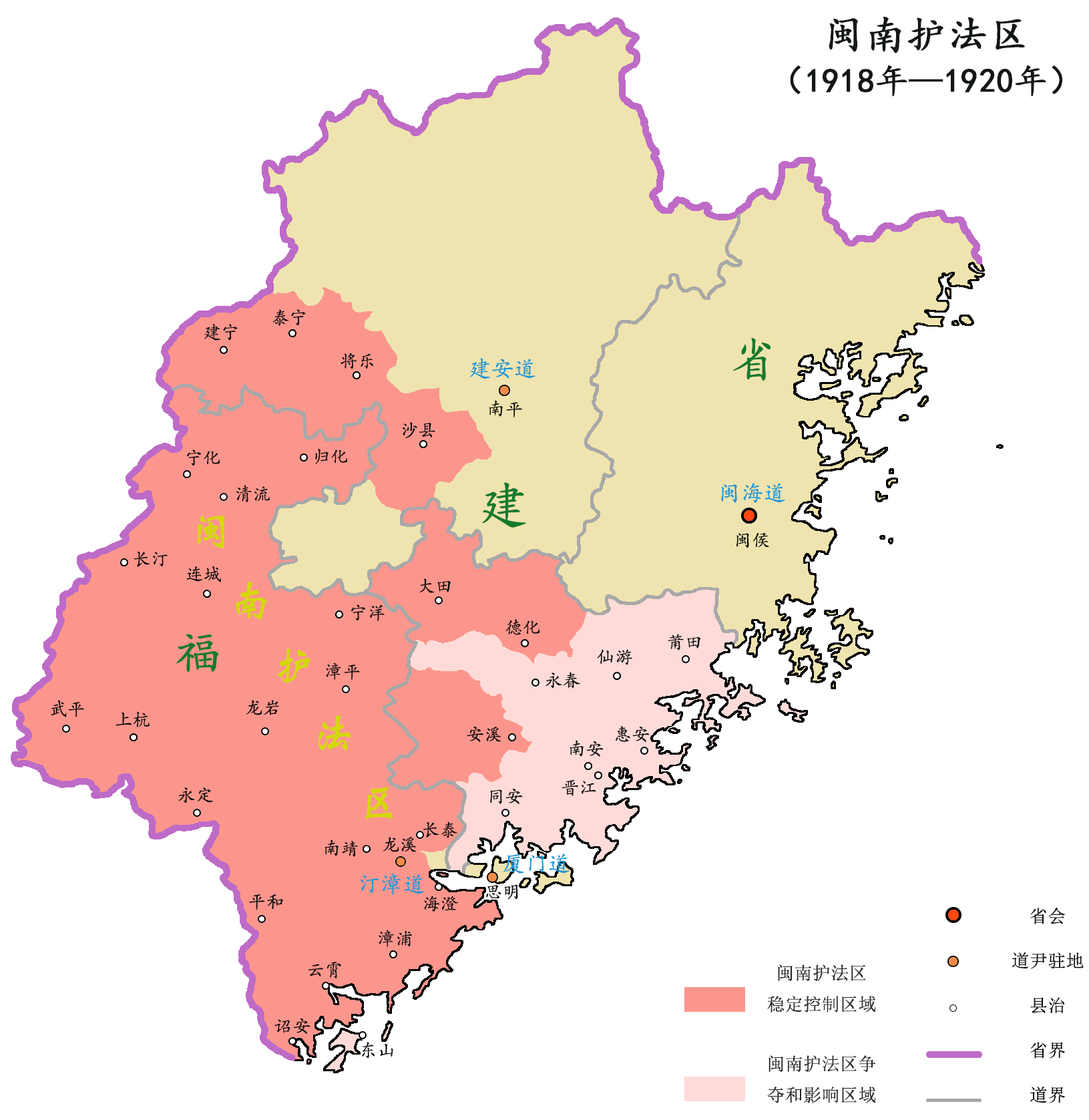
Map of the Constitution Protection Region of Southern Fujian established by Chen

During his two years in southern Fujian (Minnan), Chen established a progressive administration in the twenty-six counties under his control, creating what some contemporaries called a "Little Model China" (小模範中國) or the "Moscow of Southern Fujian". Influenced by the New Culture Movement and the May Fourth Movement, his reforms focused on building modern civil institutions. He transformed Zhangzhou into an "anarcho-socialist Mecca".

Chen invited prominent intellectuals to Zhangzhou and supported the publication of the magazine Minxing bao (Fujian Star), which promoted new ideas and the use of vernacular language. He undertook significant urban renewal in Zhangzhou, tearing down old city walls, building new roads, and establishing public parks. American consular reports noted the stark contrast between the progressive improvements in Zhangzhou and the stagnant conditions in nearby Amoy. He placed a strong emphasis on education, financing study abroad for dozens of students (including Peng Pai) and promoting a program for students to study in France.

In the spring of 1920, General Alexey Potapov, a representative of Vladimir Lenin, secretly visited Chen in Zhangzhou in the first official contact between Soviet Russia and a Chinese regional leader. Lenin offered arms and support, but Chen politely declined, citing his disagreement with Soviet violations of human rights and the lack of harbour facilities. Despite some Western reports calling him a "Bolshevik general", Chen's administration was seen as socialist but not radically Communist. In May 1920, Chen wrote a letter to Lenin, whom he addressed as "my teacher", stating his belief that Bolshevism would "bring happiness to the human beings", although the letter's extravagant praise was likely influenced by its drafter, the Marxist propagandist Zhu Zhixin.

== Governor of Guangdong and federalist (1920–1922) ==
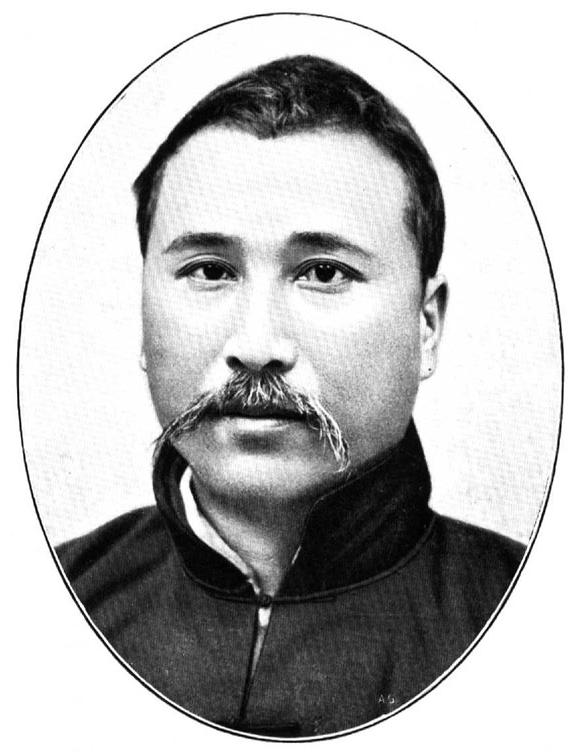
Chen Jiongming

In the summer of 1920, Chen launched the First Guangdong–Guangxi War to liberate Guangdong from the control of Guangxi militarists. His Guangdong Army (粵軍, Yuejun) captured Canton, and on 2 November 1920, Chen returned to the city to a huge welcome. Urged by provincial leaders to prioritize a "ten-year period of rest and savings", Chen embraced a policy of peaceful reconstruction aligned with his federalist vision.

=== Reforms in Guangdong ===
As Civil Governor of Guangdong and Commander-in-Chief of the Guangdong Army, Chen embarked on a comprehensive reform program to establish Guangdong as a model province. His governance created a "favorable environment for changing the conservative social ethos" of the province and made Guangzhou a "May Fourth crucible". As a pragmatist, his socialist ideals were closer to anarchism than Marxism, advocating class cooperation over struggle. Key reforms included:

- Prohibition of gambling and opium: Chen immediately banned gambling and took strict measures against opium, publicly burning large quantities of confiscated drugs.
- Education reform: He established an independent Provincial Education Committee, appointing New Culture Movement leader Chen Duxiu as its first chairman. This move, which gave the newly formed Chinese Communist Party a base of operations, was part of Chen's effort to stimulate intellectual transformation in the province. Compulsory public education for both boys and girls was implemented, and the University of Guangdong (later Sun Yat-sen University) was established.
- Industrial and commercial development: He promoted the silk industry, encouraged investment from overseas Chinese, and planned a provincial railway system.
- Modern municipalities and local self-government: The Provisional Charter of the City of Canton was promulgated in December 1920, making Canton the first modern city in China outside of foreign settlements. He promoted elected county assemblies and magistrates. The Guangdong Provisional Constitution of 1921, ratified in December, emphasized civil rights and provincial autonomy. This period marked the height of the federalist movement in China, with several other provinces drafting their own constitutions.

=== Sun Yat-sen's "election" and the Guangxi campaign ===
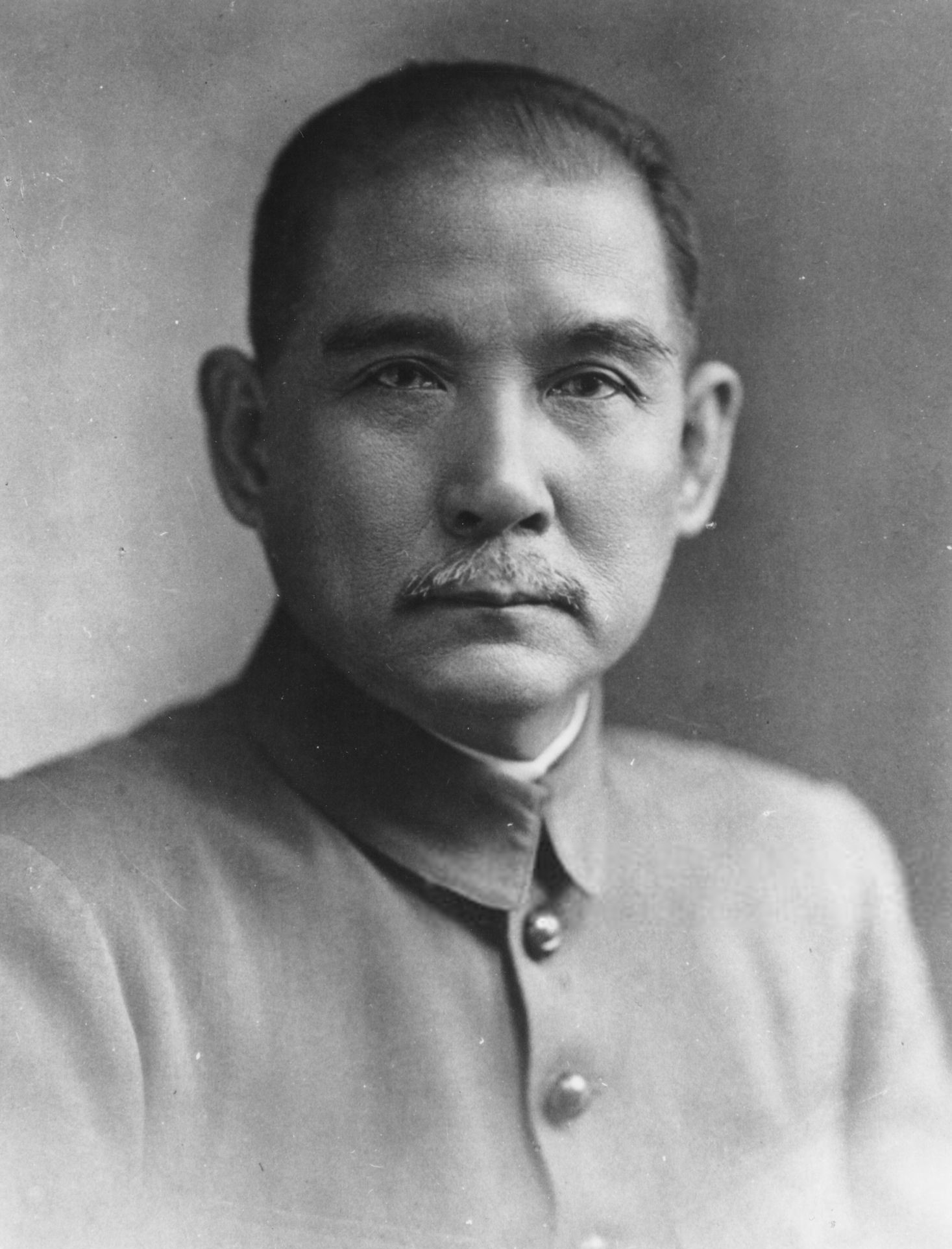
Sun Yat-sen

Despite the prevailing sentiment for peace and reconstruction in Guangdong, Sun Yat-sen, who had returned to Canton in November 1920, moved to consolidate his power. In February 1921, he proposed that a president be elected for the southern government. This was opposed by many, including leaders of southwestern provinces and military commanders of the Guangdong Army, who feared it would make Guangdong a target for Northern invasion and questioned the province's capacity to sustain such a conflict. Chen Jiongming also believed the time was inopportune, as it would destroy the unity of the South and isolate Guangdong. He noted that only about 250–260 members of the old parliament remained in Canton, less than half the number needed for a quorum under the Provisional Constitution of 1912.

Nevertheless, on 7 April 1921, in an emergency joint session of parliament, Sun Yat-sen was elected "President-Extraordinary" (非常大總統) with 218 votes; Chen Jiongming received 3. The election, which took only an hour and fifty minutes, was marred by intimidation, with 700–800 "fierce-looking" ruffians in the spectators' gallery, and allegations of bribery. This "bogus" election, as Chen's supporters saw it, along with Sun's autocratic style, deeply discontented the editors of the socialist newspaper Guangdong qunbao, Chen Gongbo and Tan Pingshan.

The Peking government reacted to Sun's election by backing a Guangxi Army invasion of Guangdong in April 1921. Chen Jiongming led the Guangdong Army to counter this threat. After initial defensive fighting, he launched a counteroffensive in June, capturing Wuzhou and Nanning by August. The campaign concluded with the fall of Longzhou in September, but the victory was costly, with over 10,000 Guangdong soldiers killed and the provincial treasury depleted by about $8 million. Chen, while establishing a self-government program in Guangxi under the new civil governor Ma Junwu (馬君武), lamented the heavy burden the war had placed on Guangdong.

=== Conflict with Sun Yat-sen ===
On 15 October 1921, Sun left Canton at the head of a Northern Expeditionary Army to reunify China by force. Chen strongly opposed the venture and refused to provide significant financial or military support. Sun's expedition stalled in Guilin, and he blamed Chen for the failure. On 21 March 1922, Deng Keng (鄧鏗), Chen's chief of staff, was assassinated in Canton. While Nationalist historians have accused Chen of the crime, contemporary reports and later analyses suggest the assassination was instigated by Sun's faction to weaken Chen's control over the military.

On 21 April, Sun dismissed Chen from all his offices. Fearing for his safety and seeking to avoid open conflict, Chen left Canton for his hometown of Huizhou at 2:00 am on 22 April, with 10,000 of his troops following.

== June 16 Incident and break with Sun (1922) ==
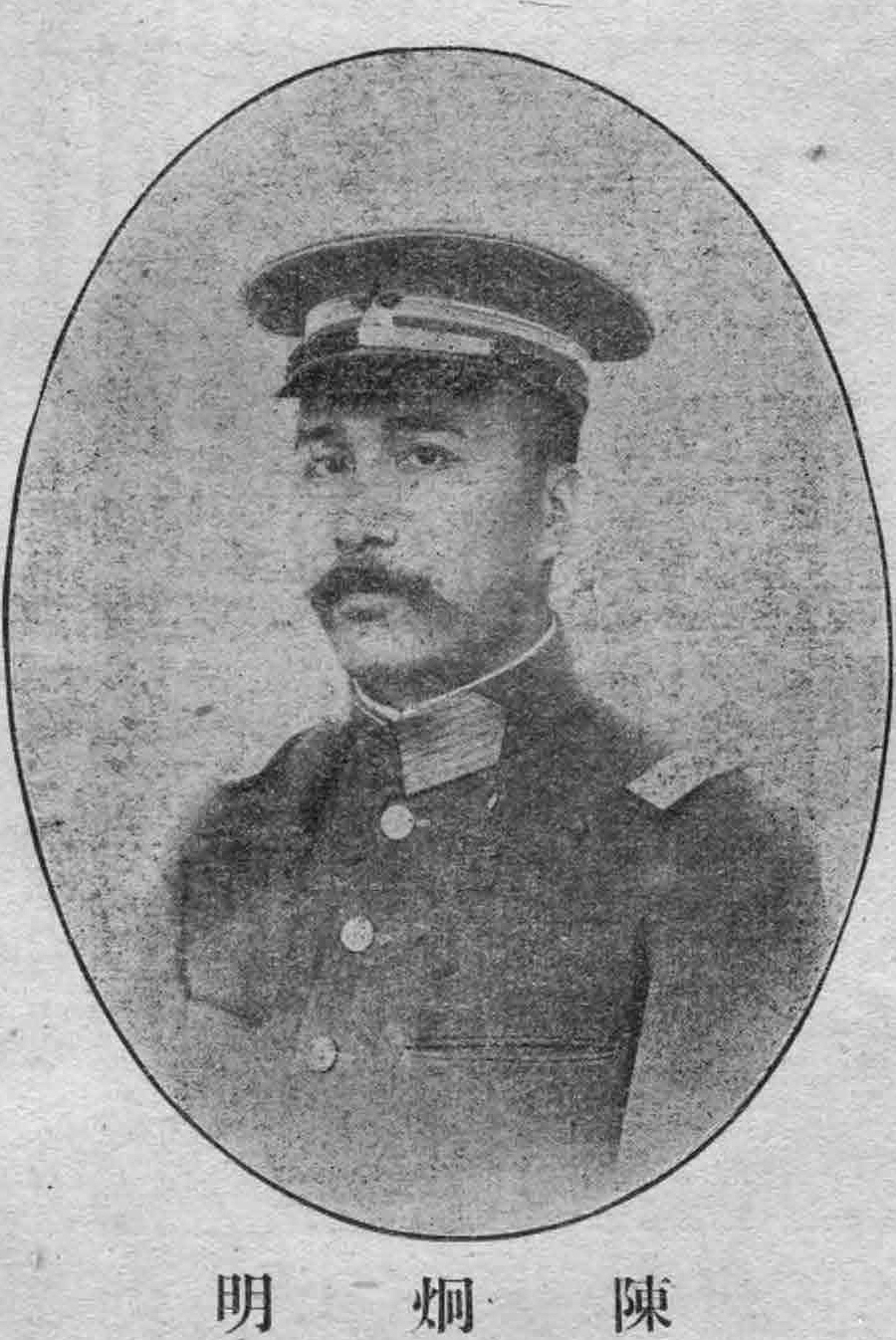
Chen c. 1920

The June 16 Incident of 1922 marked the final, irrevocable break between Chen Jiongming and Sun Yat-sen and became a highly contested point in Chen's career.

=== Prelude to the incident ===
While Chen was in Huizhou, the political situation in China shifted. In May 1922, Wu Peifu defeated Zhang Zuolin, consolidating Zhili clique control in the North. Wu and other northern leaders advocated for peaceful unification by restoring the 1912 Provisional Constitution and having President Li Yuanhong resume office. Prominent educators, led by Cai Yuanpei, pleaded with Sun to resign his "extraordinary" presidency and join the national reunification effort, but he refused.

In Canton, Guangdong Army commanders loyal to Chen, led by Ye Ju (葉舉), became increasingly restive over lack of pay and Sun's intransigence. On 12 June, Sun, from his headquarters on the warship Yongfeng, threatened to use poison gas against Ye Ju's troops if they did not withdraw. Chen, from Huizhou, urged a peaceful resolution but supported the army's call for Sun's resignation.

=== Revolt and Sun's bombardment of Canton ===
At 3:00 am on 16 June 1922, a detachment of the Guangdong Army surrounded Sun Yat-sen's Presidential Palace. Sun, warned two hours earlier, had already escaped to the Yongfeng. On 17 June, Sun ordered the bombardment of Canton from his warship. The indiscriminate shelling lasted several hours, causing over a hundred civilian deaths and significant property damage.

Peace negotiations failed as Sun demanded Chen's apology while the provincial assembly and public bodies called for Sun to leave. After further skirmishes, Sun finally left Canton for Shanghai on a British gunboat on 9 August 1922. Chen returned to Canton on 15 August and resumed his position as commander-in-chief of the Guangdong Army.

=== Consequences and political differences ===
The June 16 Incident was a major blow to the Federalist movement. Most scholars conclude that Chen did not actively plan the coup, although he had ample provocation. The event solidified the ideological divide between the two leaders. Chen advocated for incremental, local-level reforms, building a federal democracy from the bottom up. Sun sought a centralized state unified by a disciplined revolutionary party elite with himself as the paramount leader. The contemporary scholar Hu Shih praised Chen's practical patriotism while criticizing Sun's willingness to sacrifice principles for power. The incident also created a dilemma for the early Chinese communists; the central leadership sided with Sun, while local Cantonese communists, who had worked under Chen's progressive administration, were falsely accused by KMT propagandists of collaborating with him.

== Defeat of federalism (1922–1925) ==
After returning to Canton, Chen resumed his civil reform programs and attempted to address the dire financial crisis left by Sun's administration. His efforts were hampered by sabotage from Sun's agents. In January 1923, facing an invasion by Sun's allied forces from Yunnan and Guangxi, Chen resigned and left for Haifeng to avoid a destructive conflict. Sun returned to Canton in February and re-established his government, which became increasingly authoritarian and reliant on Soviet support.

In May 1924, Sun's government imposed a new tax, leading to a strike by Canton merchants led by Chen Lianbai (陳廉伯), head of the Canton Merchant Volunteer Corps. On 15 October 1924, following a clash between the Merchant Corps and cadets from the newly established, Soviet-funded Whampoa Military Academy, Sun's forces, on the advice of Russian adviser Mikhail Borodin, launched a full-scale assault on the Xiguan (西關) district, the wealthiest part of Canton. Government agents set fires, destroying 3,000 buildings and killing over 2,000 civilians in what became known as the Xiguan Massacre (西關慘案).

The massacre galvanized Cantonese opposition to Sun. An alliance of citizens called for Chen to lead the Guangdong Army to oust Sun's government. In February 1925, after Sun's death, forces from the Whampoa academy, led by Chiang Kai-shek and equipped with superior Soviet weaponry, launched the First East River Campaign against Chen's army. Despite being outnumbered, Chiang's forces, with Russian officers directing operations, defeated the Guangdong Army. By early April, Chen had left for Shanghai. A second East River campaign in September 1925 destroyed the remnants of the Guangdong Army. The defeat of Chen's federalist forces, followed by the Northern Expedition, led to the nominal unification of China under a centralized KMT government and marked the end of the federalist movement as a viable political force.

== Later years and death (1925–1933) ==
After 1925, Chen made his home in Hong Kong, where he continued to advocate for the peaceful, federalist unification of China.

=== Founding of the China Zhi Gong Party ===
On 10 October 1925, the Hongmen Zhigong Association (洪門致公堂) of the Americas, a large Chinese fraternal organization, was formally reorganized in San Francisco into a political party, the China Zhi Gong Party (中國致公黨). Disillusioned by Sun's "sovietized" KMT, they elected Chen Jiongming as their first chairman. The party moved its headquarters to Hong Kong in 1926 and rapidly gained members among overseas Chinese. Its platform called for a federal republic, a multiparty system, protection of basic freedoms, and an independent judiciary.

=== Advocacy for federalism ===
In 1927, Chen published A Proposal for the Unification of China (中國統一芻議, Zhongguo tongyi chuyi), which reiterated his federalist philosophy. He argued for a democratic China built from the bottom up, with power shared between central, provincial, and local governments. The scholar Zhang Binglin, in his foreword to the book, praised Chen's moderation and reason, contrasting it with Sun Yat-sen's Soviet-style one-party dictatorship. After the Mukden Incident in 1931, Chen issued an open letter to the Chinese people, warning of the dangers of Japanese aggression and Communist influence and exhorting them to rise above factionalism.

=== Death ===
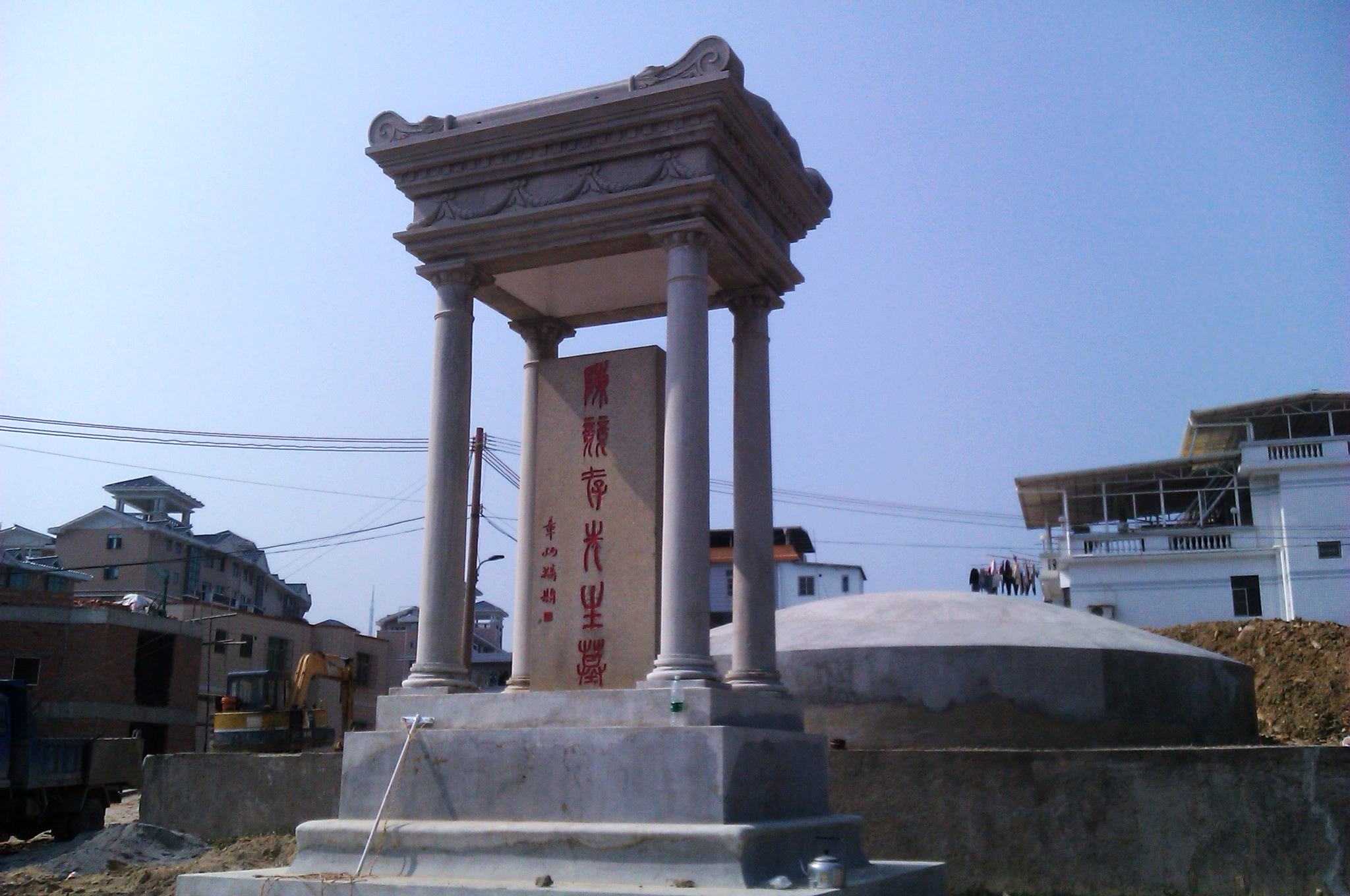
Tomb of Chen Jiongming on Ziwei Hill, Huizhou, Guangdong

Chen contracted typhoid fever in August 1933 and died in Hong Kong on 22 September 1933, at the age of fifty-five. He died in poverty. His family was so poor they could not afford a coffin, which was provided by the Zhigong Party and other supporters. After a funeral service attended by many, his casket was temporarily stored. On 3 April 1935, he was buried on Ziwei Hill (紫薇山) in Huizhou.

== Legacy ==
For decades, both Nationalist and Communist historiography portrayed Chen Jiongming as a counter-revolutionary warlord who betrayed Sun Yat-sen and obstructed the unification of China. This narrative stemmed from his opposition to Sun's centralized, one-party state and his role in the June 16 Incident.

Since the late 20th century, a re-evaluation of Chen's role has occurred in academic circles, particularly outside mainland China. Scholars have highlighted his commitment to federalism, democratic reform, and social progress, as evidenced by his administrations in Guangdong and southern Fujian. His son, Leslie H. Dingyan Chen, published a significant English-language biography in 1999 to "rescue the concept of Chinese federalism and the reputation of one patriot who espoused it".

Chen's vision for a federal system is seen by some as a viable, democratic alternative to the centralized, authoritarian paths ultimately taken by both the KMT and the Communists. His emphasis on local self-government, rule of law, and peaceful development resonates with ongoing discussions about political reform in China. The China Zhi Gong Party, which he co-founded, continues to exist as one of the eight legally recognized minor political parties in the People's Republic of China, though its platform and role are vastly different from Chen's original vision.

Contemporary observers such as John Dewey and Bertrand Russell praised Chen's reform efforts. Dewey, after visiting Guangdong in 1921, called Chen "by all odds the most impressive of all the officials whom I have met in China". While his political defeat prevented his vision from being realized, Chen Jiongming remains a significant figure for understanding the diverse political currents and alternative paths considered during China's tumultuous Republican era.
