= Li Liejun =

Chinese revolutionary leader and general in the early Republic of China (1882–1946)

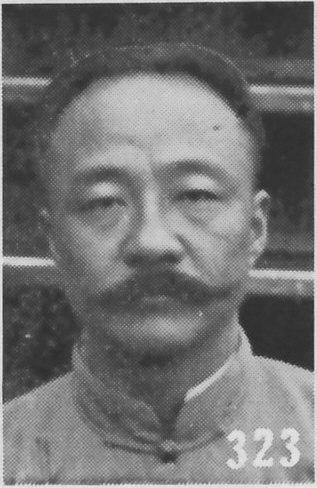

Personal details
- Born: February 23, 1882 Wuning, Jiangxi, Qing dynasty
- Died: February 20, 1946 (aged 63) Chongqing, Republic of China
- Occupation: General, Politician, Governor of Jiangxi
- Awards: Order of Rank and Merit

Military service
- Battles/wars: Xinhai Revolution; Second Revolution; National Protection War; Constitutional Protection Movement

Li Liejun (simplified Chinese: 李烈钧; traditional Chinese: 李烈鈞; pinyin: Lǐ Lièjūn; Wade–Giles: Li Lie-chün; 23 February 1882 – 20 February 1946), was a Chinese revolutionary leader and general in the early Republic of China.

== Biography ==
Li was born in Wuning, Jiangxi, Province. In 1904, he was sent on a government scholarship to Japan to study at the Tokyo Shimbu Gakko, a military preparatory academy. In 1907, he was accepted into the artillery school of the Imperial Japanese Army Academy where his classmates included Yan Xishan, Tang Jiyao and Cheng Qian. While in Japan, he also joined the Tongmenghui, a revolutionary society dedicated to the overthrow of the Qing dynasty and the modernization of China. He returned to China in 1908 to accept a military posting in Jiangxi Province, but suspected of anti-government politics, he was placed under house arrest. In 1909, he relocated to Yunnan Province to accept a position as instructor at the Yunnan Military Academy in Kunming.

Li returned to Jiangxi on hearing of the Wuchang Uprising and was appointed commander of the pro-republican forces in Jiujiang in Xinhai Revolution. He also raised a pro-republic army in Anhui Province and after joining forces with Li Yuanhong, eventually came to control military forces in five provinces of central China. Although appointed Military Governor of Jiangxi Province 1912. He was deposed by Yuan Shikai in 1913 as a step to weaken the Kuomintang (KMT) democratic bloc control gubernatorial posts. As part of the Second Revolution, Li rose up against Yuan at Hukou, Jiangxi, on 12 July 1913, with the support of Sun Yat-sen. However, the rebellion was crushed, and Li was forced to flee into exile, at first to Japan, then to Europe, and later to southeast Asia. In 1915, he became a member of the Chinese Revolutionary Party, and re-entered Yunnan from French Indochina. Yunnan warlord Cai E placed Li in command of one of his three armies, and assigned him the task of taking Guangxi Province during the National Protection War against Yuan Shikai. However, Li was defeated by the Guangdong-based warlord Long Jiguang and was forced to flee to Hainan. The war came to an end with Yuan Shikai’s death in 1916, and Li was able to return via Hong Kong and Shanghai in 1917 at the invitation of Sun Yatsen to accept promotion to field marshal and the post of chief of staff of the Constitutional Protection Movement.

Li remained an important decision-maker in the Kuomintang government after Chiang Kai-shek took power in 1925. Appointed as a State Councilor of the Nationalist Government in 1931 he was nominated a member of the National Military Council in 1932 and served until 1945. He died on February 20, 1946, in Chongqing.
