= Constitutional Protection Movement =

Chinese political movements (1917–1922)

- Part of the aftermath of the Third Revolution and the Warlord Era
Date	July 1917 – January 24, 1920 (first movement); January 1921 – June 16, 1922 (second movement)
Location	China
Result	Beiyang victory
First movement: Beiyang government; Zhili clique; Anhui clique	First movement: Constitutional Protection junta; Kuomintang; Yunnan clique; Guangxi clique
Second movement: Beiyang government; Zhili clique; Fengtian clique	Second movement: Guangzhou government; Kuomintang

Commanders and leaders
Feng Guozhang; Xu Shichang; Li Yuanhong; Cao Kun; Wu Peifu; Duan Qirui	Sun Yat-sen; Tang Jiyao; Wu Tingfang; Tang Shaoyi; Hu Hanmin; Lu Rongting; Cen Chunxuan; Lin Baoyi; Cheng Biguang; Li Liejun; Li Fulin; Xu Chongzhi; Chen Jiongming; Chiang Kai-shek; Chen Ce

Constitutional Protection Movement
- Traditional Chinese: 護法運動
- Simplified Chinese: 护法运动
Transcriptions
Standard Mandarin
- Hanyu Pinyin: Hùfǎ yùndòng
- Wade–Giles: hu^{4}-fa^{3} yün^{4}-tung^{5}

The Constitutional Protection Movement (Chinese: 護法運動) was a series of movements led by Sun Yat-sen to resist the Beiyang government between 1917 and 1922, in which Sun established another government in Guangzhou as a result. It was known as the Fourth Revolution by the Kuomintang. The constitution that it intended to protect was the Provisional Constitution of the Republic of China. The first movement lasted from 1917 to 1920; the second from 1921 to 1922. An attempted third movement, begun in 1923, ultimately became the genesis for the Northern Expedition in 1926.

== Origin ==
After the Xinhai Revolution in 1911, the newly established Republic of China, pursuant to its Provisional Constitution, held the first parliamentary election in February 1913, which then convened as the National Assembly of the Republic of China for the first time on April 8. The Kuomintang won a majority of the seats, and Song Jiaoren was designated to form the cabinet. He was assassinated by President Yuan Shikai shortly after, however, prompting the Kuomintang to call for the Second Revolution. Yuan Shikai repressed the resistance with force, forcing Sun Yat-sen and other leaders of the Kuomintang to flee abroad to Japan.

Yuan Shikai dissolved the parliament as well as abolishing the Provisional Constitution, eventually trying to become emperor. In December 1915, Cai E and others launched the National Protection War against Yuan Shikai and achieved success. Yuan Shikai was forced to abdicate and died on June 6, 1916.

After the death of Yuan Shikai, Li Yuanhong succeeded him as president. Duan Qirui was re-appointed prime minister, and the old parliament was restored. However, Li and Duan had a major disagreement shortly after on whether or not to enter World War I and declare war on Germany. Duan insisted on joining the war while Li and the parliament were more guarded on the matter. Li Yuanhong removed Duan from office and called for national military support. Monarchist general Zhang Xun took the opportunity to enter Beijing with force. He then dissolved the parliament and attempted to restore Puyi and the Qing dynasty on July 1, in what is known as the Manchu Restoration. The restoration was repressed by Duan Qirui five days later. Li resigned from the presidency and was succeeded by Feng Guozhang. Duan re-established the new government and, with Liang Qichao, convoked a new senate.

== The First Constitutional Protection Movement ==
In July 1917, Sun Yat-sen arrived in Guangzhou from Shanghai, and telegrammed the original members of parliament in Peking to come to Guangzhou and establish a new government. The Naval Minister Cheng Biguang arrived in Guangzhou on July 22 with nine ships to support Sun Yat-sen.

On August 25, approximately 100 of the original members of parliament convened a conference in Guangzhou and passed a resolution establishing a military government in Guangzhou to protect the Provisional Constitution. The military government consisted of a generalissimo and three field marshals. On September 1, 84 of the 91 members in the Guangzhou parliament elected Sun Yat-sen as the generalissimo. They selected the leaders of the National Protection War Tang Jiyao of the Yunnan clique and Lu Rongting of the Old Guangxi clique as marshals, Wu Tingfang as the Minister of Foreign Affairs, Tang Shaoyi as the Minister of Finance (abstained), Cheng Biguang as the Naval Minister, and Hu Hanmin as the Minister of Communications. Sun Yat-sen inaugurated on September 10, and appointed Li Liejun as the Chief of Staff, Li Fulin as the Commander of the Guards, Xu Chongzhi as staff officer and Chen Jiongming as the Commander of the First Army.

=== Constitutional Protection War ===
After the establishment of the Guangzhou Military Government, the north and the south of China were in confrontation. Among the supporters of Guangzhou Government, the militants in Guangxi and Yunnan were superior in strength. Hunan's Tan Yanxi, Zhao Tihuan and Cheng Chieng also supporting the Constitutional Protection Movement. With the support of Lu Rongting and the Guangxi Army, the Constitutional Protection Army defeated Duan Qirui's assault in November. Duan resigned as the North's prime minister as a result, leaving the post to Feng Guozhang. The north and the south were in a temporary armistice.

Pressed by the Zhili clique and the Anhui clique, Feng Guozhang ordered Cao Kun to make war again on Hunan province in January and defeated the Constitutional Protection Army in April. However, after capturing Hunan, the Zhili commander Wu Peifu halted the attack on Guangdong and Guangxi province and had a peaceful settlement with the south in July. Xu Shichang also advocated peace negotiation when he was inaugurated as the president in October, which led to the end of the war.

=== Reorganization of the military government ===
Besides the Navy, Generalissimo Guards and twenty battalions of the Guangdong Army, Sun Yat-sen lacked strong support of military strength in the Guangzhou Military Government, and sometimes his order was only effective in the Generalissmo Government. Sun had thoughts of mutiny at once, hoping to overthrow the Guangxi influence, and had personally ordered the Navy to fire at the Guangxi headquarters at one time. Near the end of 1917, Lu Rongting, Tang Jiyao, Mo Rongxin and others along with Tang Shaoyi convened a conference, and they advocated recognition of Feng Guozhang's presidency and formation a united government.

During 1918, Cheng Biguang aligned himself with the Guangxi clique, and was assassinated. The Extraordinary Session of Parliament was controlled by the Guangxi clique, and was restructured in May 1918 by replacing the office of generalissimo with a committee of seven executives consisting of Sun, Tang Shaoyi, Wu Tingfang, and Tang Jiyao on one side and Lu Rongting, Cen Chunxuan, and Lin Baoyi on the other. Feeling marginalized, Sun Yat-sen resigned as the generalissimo, and left Guangzhou for Shanghai. The Guangzhou Military Government was now headed by Cen Chunxuan, the chief executive. Wu Tingfang's election as Guangdong's governor was nullified by Lu Rongting.

From February to August 1919, the North and South held negotiations in Shanghai but they were stalled by Duan's sabotage. All MPs who did not attend the southern "extraordinary" session were disqualified and replaced. Parliament was adjourned by its Speaker Lin Sen on January 24, 1920, when a faction of MPs boycotted the assembly, depriving it of a quorum. Cen also suspended the salaries of the MPs. With the southern government effectively under the influence of the Old Guangxi clique, the first constitutional protection movement was over.

== The Second Constitutional Protection Movement ==
In Shanghai, Sun re-organized the Kuomintang to oust the Guangxi junta from the Southern government. The military governor of Guangdong, Chen Jiongming raised 20 battalions from Fujian. In 1920, Duan and the northern parliament was ousted after the Zhili–Anhui War. Lu and Cen used this as a pretext to explore unification with the Zhili clique. The KMT denounced these secret negotiations and the southern parliament moved to Yunnan in August and in Sichuan from September to October. Tensions between the Yunnan clique and the Guangxi clique allowed Chen to invade on August 11 in the Guangdong–Guangxi War. Chen Jiongming expelled the Guangxi clique from Guangzhou allowing Sun to return by the end of November.

Parliament reconvened in Guangzhou in January 1921. Of the remaining four executives, Tang Jiyao had to remain in Yunnan to protect his province, Wu Tingfang was ailing, and Tang Shaoyi was becoming uninterested. In April 1921, the National Assembly dissolved the military government and elected Sun Yat-sen "extraordinary president". But the new Guangzhou government, without any foreign recognition, was beset with questions of legitimacy as its form existed outside of the constitution it was mandated to protect. For Chen Jiongming, Sun's extraconstitutional election was a power grab. Relations further deteriorated when Chen invited anarchists, communists, and federalists to the movement. Chen thought it would swell their numbers but Sun believed they would dilute his ideology, the Three Principles of the People.

=== End of the movement ===
Immediately after his inauguration in May, Sun ordered the Northern Expedition to force the unification of China. In the summer of 1922, Sun Yat-sen personally established the division headquarters in Shaoguan to launch the expedition by coordinating the Guangdong, Yunnan, Jiangxi, and Hunan armies. Sun Yat-sen's Northern Expedition ultimately led to the conflict with Chen Jiongming. Chen Jiongming advocated suspension of military conflict, first building up Guangdong as a province of autonomy. Meanwhile, the Zhili clique started a national movement to reunite the Northern and Southern governments by having the two rival presidents resign in favor of a restored Li Yuanhong. In June, the Northern government's president, Xu Shichang stepped down, and the original National Assembly reconvened in Beijing. To Chen Jiongming, the Constitutional Protection Movement's purpose was achieved, but for Sun the new government was a smokescreen to mask Cao Kun's rule. On June 16, the presidential palace was shelled by Chen's forces. Sun Yat-sen, Chiang Kai-shek, Chen Ce, and the loyalists were safely escorted by ship to Shanghai.

== Impact ==
Sun realized the failure of both movements was based on his over reliance on the military forces of others. After the debacle, Sun found that the revolution needed its own military strength. With the help of the Soviet Union and the alliance with the Chinese Communist Party, Sun retook the Guangzhou government for the third time in 1923. However, protecting the provisional government was not its purpose. Instead, building a strong military base centered on the Whampoa Military Academy and creating a one-party state to defeat the warlords was its goal. This was behind the success of the Northern Expedition that led to the reunification of China.

Historical scholars fault the movements' reliance on legal campaign tactics. The National Assembly's extraordinary session lacked a quorum. Practically from the beginning the military government was not set up by the procedures of legitimate constitutional law. It completely lacked foreign recognition. It could barely maintain unity within itself, let alone claim to be the legitimate government of all China. Simply by creating a rival government, the integrity of the Republic was damaged and set precedents for rival governments in China down to the current day.

According to recent published studies, the first government in 1917 was funded by the German Empire which provided two million dollars because Sun had opposed China's entry into the First World War. The money allowed Sun to bribe the northern navy to defect and pay for the salaries of the National Assembly. He also used the money to buy the loyalty of the southwest due to the nearly mercenary nature of the warlords. Relations with the Germans became strained when it was revealed that they had supported the Manchu Restoration and that Sun refused to cooperate in the Hindu–German Conspiracy. With KMT activists being arrested abroad and Germany losing the war, Sun declared war against the Central Powers in the vain hope of garnering recognition and a seat at the Paris Peace Conference but the seat went to the Beiyang government instead. After the assassination of Tang Hualong by a Nationalist in Canada, several KMT overseas branches were banned. Sun Yat-sen also relied on gambling and selling opium to pay for his government which lacked practical revolutionary spirit.

== See also ==
- Warlord Era
- History of the Republic of China
- Military of the Republic of China
