= Hu Hanmin =

Chinese politician

- 胡漢民
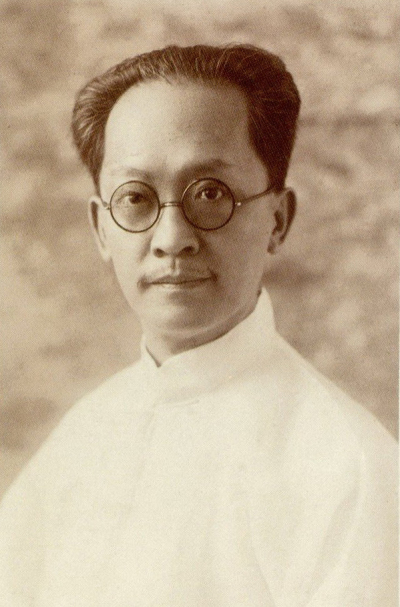

Chairman of the Kuomintang
- In office 7 December 1935 – 12 May 1936
- Preceded by: Wu Zhihui, Li Shizeng
- Succeeded by: Chiang Kai-shek

President of the Legislative Yuan
- In office 8 October 1928 – 2 March 1931
- Preceded by: Office established
- Succeeded by: Lin Sen

Personal details
- Born: 9 December 1879 Panyu, Guangdong, China
- Died: 12 May 1936 (aged 56) Guangdong, Republic of China
- Cause of death: Intracerebral hemorrhage
- Party: Kuomintang (Western Hills Group)
- Education: Hosei University
- Occupation: Philosopher, politician

Chinese name
- Traditional Chinese: 胡漢民
- Simplified Chinese: 胡汉民
Transcriptions
Standard Mandarin
- Hanyu Pinyin: Hú Hànmín
- Bopomofo: ㄏㄨˊㄏㄢˋㄇㄧㄣˊ
- Wade–Giles: Hu^{2} Han^{4}-min^{2}
Hakka
- Pha̍k-fa-sṳ: Fù Hon-mìn
Yue: Cantonese
- Jyutping: Wu^{4} Hon^{3} Man^{4}

Hu Hanmin (traditional Chinese: 胡漢民; simplified Chinese: 胡汉民; pinyin: Hú Hànmín; Jyutping: Wu4 Hon3 Man4; 9 December 1879 – 12 May 1936) was a Chinese philosopher and politician who was one of the early conservative right-wing faction leaders in the Kuomintang (KMT) during revolutionary China.

== Biography ==
Hu was of Hakka descent from Ji'an, Jiangxi. Trần Xuân Sinh claimed that Hu Hanmin could be the descendant of Hồ Hán Thương, the second monarch of the Hồ dynasty of Vietnam. His father had moved to Panyu, Guangdong, to take up an official post.

He qualified as a Juren at the age of 21. He studied in Japan from 1902 and joined the Tongmenghui (Chinese Revolutionary Alliance) in 1905 as editor of the newspaper Min Bao. From 1907 to 1910 he took part in several armed revolutions. Shortly after the Xinhai Revolution in 1911, he was appointed Governor of Guangdong and Chief Secretary of the Provisional Government. He took part in the Second Revolution of 1913 and, after its failure, followed Sun Yat-sen to Japan. There they founded the Kuomintang (Chinese Nationalist Party). Hu lived in Guangdong from 1917 to 1921 and worked for Sun Yat-sen, first as Minister of Transport and later as Chief Adviser.

Hu Hanmin visited Kemalist Turkey and was greatly inspired by the revolutionary nationalist ideals of Kemalism. Hu hoped that Chiang would model the Republic of China on Kemalist Turkey, with limited military involvement in politics.

Hu was elected to the Central Executive Committee at the Kuomintang's first conference in January 1924. In September he acted as vice-generalissimo when Sun Yat-sen left Guangzhou for Shaoguan. Sun died in Beijing in March 1925, and Hu was one of the three most powerful figures in the Kuomintang. The other two were Wang Jingwei and Liao Zhongkai. Liao was assassinated in August that year, and Hu was suspected and arrested. After the Ninghan split in 1927, Hu supported Chiang Kai-shek and was head of the Legislative Yuan in Nanjing.

Despite agreeing to cooperate with Chiang's government, Hu opposed Chiang's domination of political power, and instead advocated for power to be exercised by the party. Hu also clashed with Chiang over Chiang's offer to give major governmental positions to warlord Zhang Xueliang in exchange for Zhang's loyalty, an offer which Hu denounced as a "dirty deal". Hu and Chiang's cooperation fell apart when Wang Jingwei, who had rebelled against Chiang's government, introduced a draft constitution in October 1930. In response to Wang, Chiang broke his previous agreement with Hu to hold off the promulgation of his own Provisional Constitution. Hu, fearing that a constitution would sideline the role of the disciples of Sun Yat-sen in implementing his teachings as the law of the land, and that Chiang would use the Constitution to legalize his monopoly on power, strongly criticized the plan.

Later, on 28 February 1931, Hu was placed under house arrest by Chiang because of disputes over the new Provisional Constitution. Internal party pressure forced Chiang to release him. Hu then became a powerful leader in South China, advocating three political principles: resistance to Japanese invasion, resistance to warlords, and resistance to the self-proclaimed leader Chiang Kai-shek. The anti-Chiang factions in the KMT gathered in Guangzhou to set up a rival government. They demanded Chiang's resignation from his dual post of president and premier. Civil war was averted by the Japanese invasion of Manchuria. Hu continued to rule southern China, the heartland of the KMT, with the help of Chen Jitang and the New Guangxi clique. There he tried to create a model government, free of corruption and cronyism, to discredit Chiang's Nanjing regime.

Although Hu nominally led the "Southwest Political Affairs Council" set up by Guangdong and Guangxi warlord cliques and lent his image to legitimize this warlord regime, the Guangdong warlord Chen Jitang remained suspicious of his influence and refused to allow him to return to Guangzhou. Hu resided instead in Hong Kong, under the warlords' effective control and receiving a stipend from Chen.

Hu was an advocate of action against Japanese aggression, criticising Chiang Kai-shek for "his spineless failure to adopt a strong policy towards the foreign power which has torn and ravaged our homeland!"

Hu visited Europe and ceased his political attack on Chiang Kai-shek in June 1935. At the first session of the Kuomintang's Fifth Conference in December 1935, he was elected Chairman of the Central Committee for Common Affairs in absentia. Hu returned to China in January 1936 and lived in Guangzhou until he died of a cerebral haemorrhage on 12 May 1936.

His death sparked a crisis. Chiang wanted to replace Hu with loyalists in southern China and end the autonomy the south had enjoyed under Hu. In response, Chen and the New Guangxi clique conspired to remove Chiang from office. In the so-called "Liangguang Incident", Chen was forced to resign as governor of Guangdong after Chiang bribed many of Chen's officers to defect and the conspiracy collapsed.

Hu's political philosophy was that one's individual rights were a function of one's membership of a nation.

Party political offices
| Preceded by Woo Tsin-hang and Li Yuying | Chairman of the Kuomintang (Nanjing); 1935–1936 | Succeeded by Chiang Kai-shek |
Political offices
| Preceded by none | President of the Legislative Yuan; 1928–1931 | Succeeded by Shao Yuanchong |
