= Zhao Hengti =

Chinese warlord

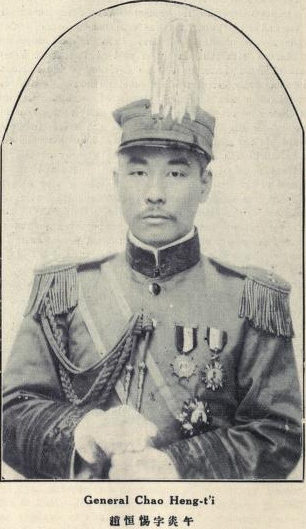
- Born: January 12, 1880; Hengyang, Hunan, China
- Died: November 23, 1971 (aged 91); Taipei, Taiwan
- Other name: Chao Heng-t'i
- Occupations: General, Warlord, Governor of Hunan
- Political party: Kuomintang

Zhao Hengti (simplified Chinese: 赵恒惕; traditional Chinese: 趙恆惕; pinyin: Zhào Héngtì; Wade–Giles: Chao Heng-t'i; 12 January 1880 – 23 November 1971), was a general and warlord in Hunan during the Warlord Era of early Republic of China.

== Biography ==
Zhao was a native of Hengyang in Hunan Province. He was sent to Japan in 1904 to study at the Tokyo Shimbu Gakko, a military preparatory school, by the Qing government, and while in Tokyo became associated with the pro-revolutionary Tongmenghui. In 1908 he continued his training at the Imperial Japanese Army Academy, graduating from the sixth class with a specialty in artillery. His classmates included Tang Jiyao, Yan Xishan, Cheng Qian and Li Liejun. Zhao returned to China in 1909, subsequently serving under Gen. Cai E and Gen. Li Quanhong in Guangxi Province during the Xinhai Revolution, which overthrew the imperial government. Made an army commander in Hunan Province, he supported Sun Yat-sen's unsuccessful attempt to overthrow President Yuan Shikai in the 1913 Second Revolution. Afterwards he was sentenced to ten years in prison, but was freed by Yuan in 1915 and restored to his position as commander of the 1st Division of the Hunan Army in 1916.

In 1922 Zhao was made commander of the New Hunan Army of the Beiyang Government. He also implemented the Constitution of Hunan Province as a provincial constitution of Hunan. Although a trusted subordinate of Tan Yankai, he went to war with Tan with the support of Wu Peifu and forced Tan's resignation from the governorship of Hunan on 25 November 1920. Zhao then became the military governor of Hunan from 26 November 1920 to 11 March 1926. He was also the civil governor at the same time, except between November 1920 and 6 April 1921. As with Chen Jiongming, Zhao was an advocate of a federalist constitution, but Mao Zedong thought his motive was to retain his own power rather than improve the governance of his country. After a conflict with Zhao, Tang Shengzhi was driven south into the arms of Chiang Kai-shek, who gave him command of the Eighth Route Army of the National Revolutionary Army. On 11 March Tang's troops deposed Zhao and replaced him as the military and civil governor of Hunan as part of the opening campaign of the Northern Expedition.

Zhao withdrew from politics and the military soon afterwards, but came out of retirement to head the Provisional Hunan Assembly during the Second Sino-Japanese War in 1939. He joined other Kuomintang leaders in exile in Taiwan in 1949, and was appointed a senior adviser to President Chiang Kai-shek. He died in Taipei in 1971 at the age of 91.

== Sources ==
- Rulers: Chinese Administrative divisions, Hunan
