= Guizhou in the Warlord Era =

Warlord factions in Guizhou

Guizhou clique
- 黔系
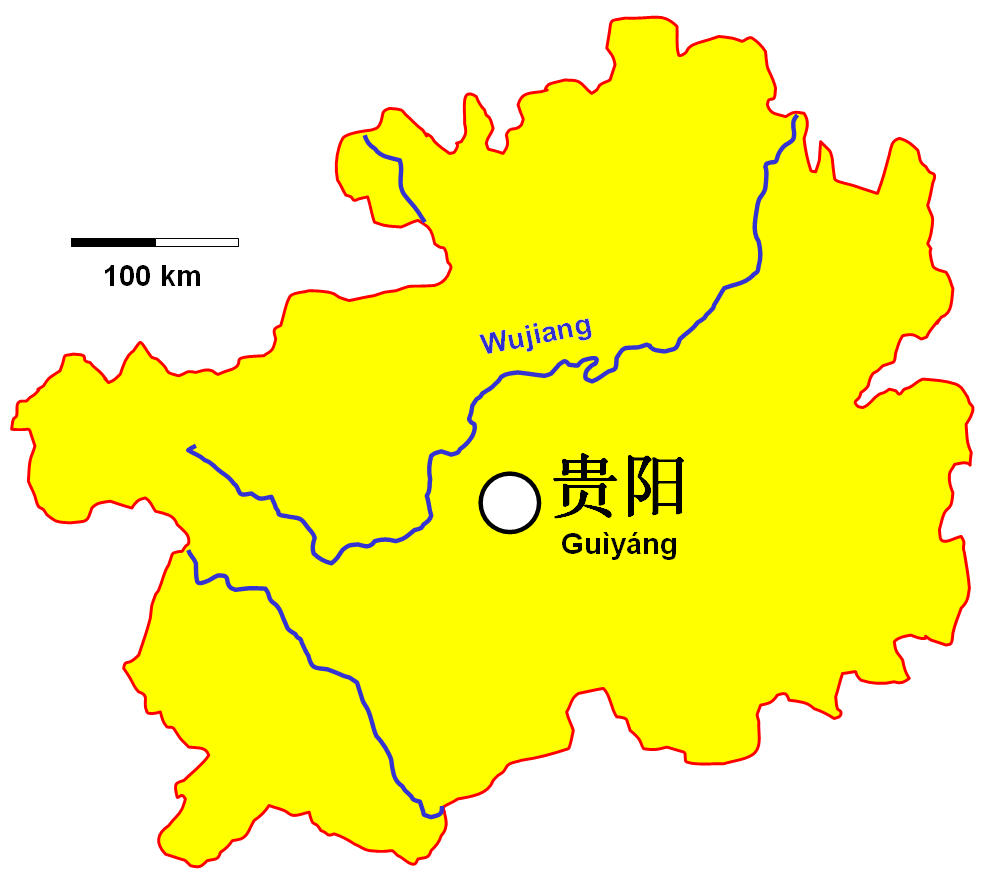
- Location of Guizhou on a map of modern China; Map of Guizhou with the location of Guiyang, the provincial capital
- Active: 1916–1935
- Country: Republic of China

Commanders
- March 1912 – November 1920: Liu Xianshi
- November 1920 – March 1921: Wang Wenhua
- August 1922 – June 1926: Yuan Zuming
- June 1926 – April 1929: Feng Xicheng
- February 1932 – May 1935: Wang Jialie

The Guizhou clique, also known as the Qian clique (Qian being the abbreviated name of Guizhou; Chinese: 黔系; pinyin: Qiánxì; Wade–Giles: Chʻien^{2}-hsi^{4}), was a minor warlord faction in the Warlord Era of the Republic of China, situated in the province of Guizhou. Due to its weak economic situation, Guizhou warlords were typically dependent on more economically successful warlords such as the Yunnan clique and the Hunan warlords.

The Guizhou warlords were very much focused on family relations, especially the Xingyi clique warlords under the Liu family. These family connections formed the core of Guizhou political power for a long time. The first Guizhou warlord in power was Liu Xianshi, heading the Liu family and the Old Xingyi clique. With the invasion of Guizhou by Yunnan general Tang Jiyao, Liu's enemies were defeated and Guizhou started a lasting relationship with Yunnan and especially Tang Jiyao. Liu Xianshi's nephew, Wang Wenhua, disagreed with much of what Liu did, and was in conflict with him, using student organizations to agitate against him. He staged the Minjiu Incident, which forced Liu to resign his posts as military and civilian governor. Liu fled to Xingyi, with Wang fleeing to Shanghai, finally being assassinated by Liu's supporters in March 1921. Liu Xianshi was thus restored to power in Guizhou, and the rivalry between uncle and nephew ended.

The Guizhou warlords did not participate in many wars or expansions aside from assisting their allies in the Yunnan clique with their expansion into Sichuan. The main power base of the Guizhou warlords shifted from Xingyi to the provincial capital, Guiyang, as warlords changed.

== Origins ==
=== Liu family ===
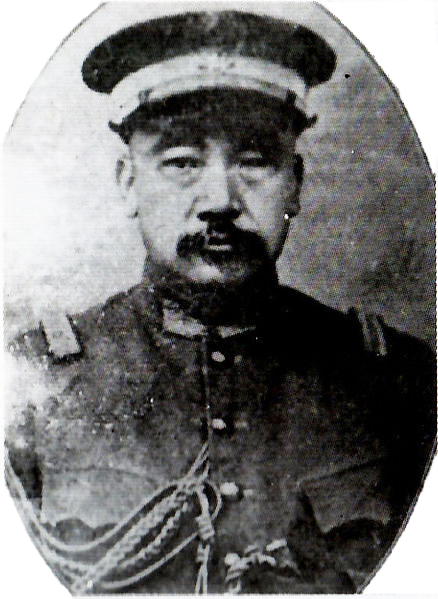
Liu Xianshi, Guizhou clique leader

The Qian clique originated with Liu Xianshi and his family. Born in Xingyi, Guizhou, Liu was born to a landlord family heavily involved in leading local militia groups during the 19th century. His cousin, Liu Xianqian, was also a military leader of the Guizhou warlords. Liu Xianshi's father, Liu Guanli, had been a regiment commander when suppressing a Hui uprising. Due to this, he rose quickly within the ranks, elevating the Liu family to a hegemonic force within Guizhou. The Liu family would be one of the major forces in the early Guizhou clique, with many of its members holding important positions in the military. Their power base was Xingyi, where they lived.

=== Revolution ===
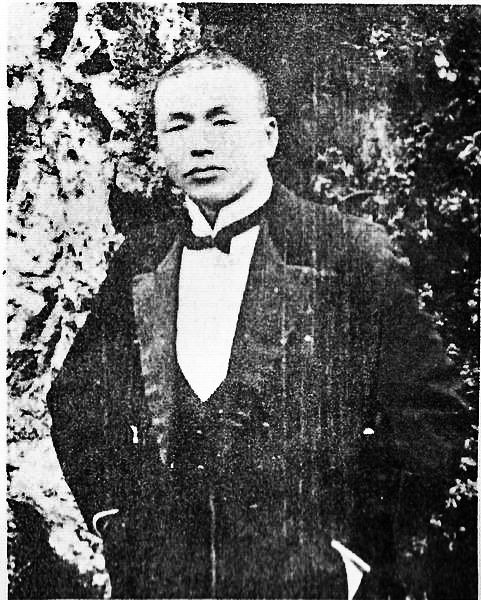
Dai Kan, supporter of Tang Jiyao and Liu Xianshi, counterrevolutionary along with Ren Kecheng and Guo Chongguang

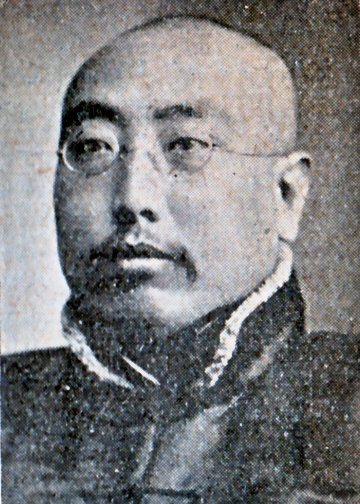
Ren Kecheng, local Constitutionalist leader, counterrevolutionary and supporer of Tang Jiyao and Liu Xianshi

After the outbreak of the Wuchang Uprising in October 1911, governor Shen Yuqing went into a state of panic, and Liu Xianshi entered the provincial capital in an emergency effort to suppress the revolution. He immediately recruited people to march into the provincial capital. However, while Liu Xianshi was on the way, Zhang Bailin, leader of the Guizhou Tongmenghui and Ren Kecheng, the local constitutionalist leader, as well as many others, forced Shen Yuqing to step down on November 4, declaring the independence of Guizhou.

The Guizhou New Army instructor and lecturer Wu Tang as well as Chief of the Army Primary School Yang Yicheng were recommended to become the governors of the Guizhou military government. Zhao Dequan was to be the Vice Governor, Zhang Bailin the Dean of the Privy Council, Ren Kecheng the Vice President, and Zhou Peiyi as Secretary-General and Chief Executive Officer.

However, the revolutionaries, known as the Self-Government Study Society, failed to take effective measures to consolidate their positions. Instead, they adopted a compromising approach to the constitutionalists and the old bureaucrats. Shen Yuqing was sent to towns to suppress the revolution. Liu Xianshi was appointed Chief of Staff of the Privy Council, and a provisional (constitution preparatory) council was established.

Ren Kecheng, Zhang Bailin, and old bureaucrat Guo Chongguang worked from inside the Privy Council to suppress the revolution. They ordered Dujun (military governor) Yang Yicheng to lead his army North, and for the Dean, Zhang Bailin, to leave the provincial capital to visit various places. At the beginning of February 1912, they killed Huang Zelin, a local Tongmenghui and provincial capital law enforcement leader. Zhang Bailin, upon returning to Guiyang, had to escape due to the threat of being killed.

=== Yunnanese invasion ===
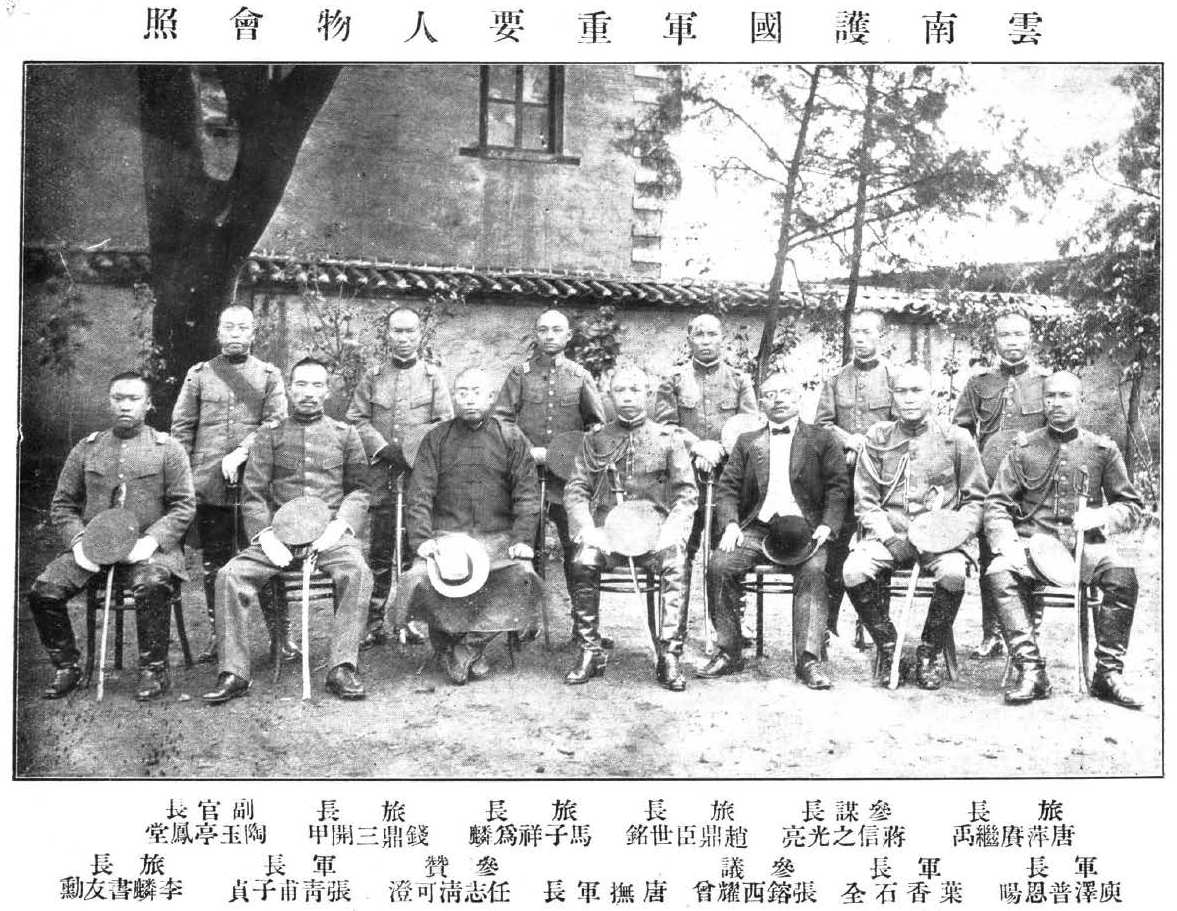
Yunnanese leaders of the National Protection War, featuring many who were involved in the Yunnan clique during the invasion of Guizhou

Although the revolution had been greatly weakened, Ren Kecheng, Liu Xianshi, Guo Chongguang, and other counter-revolutionaries felt that their power was insufficient and they dared not to launch a coup and seize power. As per Guo Chongguang's suggestion, they decided to send Dai Kan to Yunnan to look for Cai E, the governor of Yunnan, to invade Guizhou and "Stop the Guizhou Chaos", trying to slander the military government and the revolutionaries of Guizhou. After a bit of hesitation, Cai E decided to send Tang Jiyao, then an intermediate officer of the Yunnan army whose troops were situated in the North of Yunnan, to enter Guizhou and settle the divides in the Guizhou government.

At this time, Zhong Changying, one of the leaders of the Guizhou Tongmenghui, passed through Kunming from Nanjing to return to Guizhou. When he heard the news of the invasion, he urged Cai E not to interfere in the internal affairs of Guizhou Province. Cai E, heeding the advice, ordered Tang Jiyao to divert his army's path into Sichuan and then into Hubei, but Tang Jiyao had been promised the position of governorship by the reactionary forces in Guizhou. Tang reported that his front team had entered Guizhou and was unable to change course, so they had to go deep into Guizhou. Zhong Changying chased the army in an attempt to persuade Tang Jiyao to change course, but he was assassinated in Anshun. In early March 1912, Tang Jiyao led the Yunnan Army into Guiyang. At first, the revolutionary government was tricked into believing that Tang's forces were simply passing through Guizhou on their way to aid revolutionary forces in Central China. However, aided by Liu Xianshi, Tang launched a coup against the military government and became the military governor. He persecuted the revolutionaries. Thus, the Guizhou government fell into the hands of Tang Jiyao, the Constitutionalists, and the old bureaucrats.

However, the people of Guizhou, especially the revolutionaries, were extremely opposed to the invasion of Guizhou, calling Tang Jiyao and his army "Dian Kou" (Yunnanese Enemy). The Book of Guizhou's Complaints to the Compatriots of All Cities in Guizhou was published in Chongqing, the Bloody Records of Guizhou were issued in Beijing, and Guizhou Tears of Blood was published in Wuchang. Yuan Shikai, then President of China, tried to intervene in the name of the central government, but his attempt was useless.

== Guizhou under Tang Jiyao ==
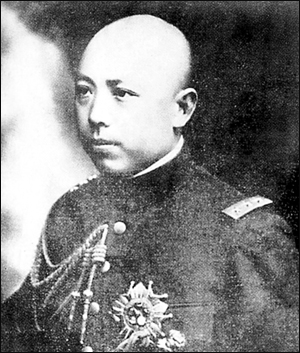
Tang Jiyao, military governor of Guizhou

On March 4, 1912, Tang Jiyao became military governor of Guizhou, recognized in May 1912 by Beijing, with Liu Xianshi assuming the role of Minister of War. Tang consolidated his power by disbanding and massacring revolutionary forces in Guizhou. Tang Jiyao and Liu Xianshi militarily ruled Guizhou jointly, with Liu commanding a new Citizen's Army, and Liu's allies becoming responsible for the civil administration of Guizhou. This brought the revolutionaries to an end and paved the way for the taking of full political power by the Liu family. Due to the sharing of power with Tang, Liu Xianshi's power was limited, but it would be rewarded with the removal of office of Cai E. In order to cultivate military talent, Tang Jiyao founded the Guizhou Military Academy, with Han Fenglou, a Yunnanese general, serving as its head. Many of the heads of the Academy were alumni of the Yunnan Military Academy. Graduates of the Academy became commanders and officers in the Yunnan and Guizhou armies, deployed in rotation.

In order to turn Guizhou into his own fiefdom, Tang Jiyao forbade the introduction of foreign progressive ideas, actively supported local forces and ideas, and established the Guizhou Unification Party as an organization to cement his power. Key members of the Guizhou Unification Party were Liu Xianshi, Ren Kecheng, Dai Kan, He Linshu, and Guo Chongguang, although many others played an important part in this party. Tang used the Guizhou Unification Party to prevent the development of the Kuomintang in Guizhou and to preserve his rule.

== Xingyi clique dominance ==
=== Liu Xianshi's administration ===
In November 1913, with Tang Jiyao returning to Yunnan after Cai E was placed under house arrest and stripped of his rank to take up his position as governor, power fell into the hands of Liu Xianshi, who assumed his position of military governor (Dujun).

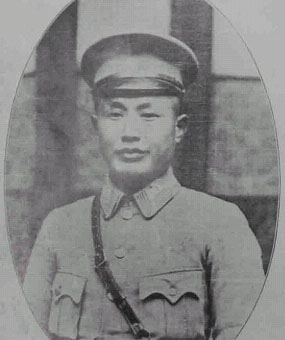
A young He Yingqin, member of the Liu family

With Yuan Shikai's declaration of the Empire of China, the National Protection War broke out. Liu Xianshi initially stayed neutral, but when the situation became urgent, he had to declare Guizhou's independence on January 27, 1916. Liu Xianshi held a military conference and decided to send the Yunnan Army Artillery Team, the Mechanical Team, and the 5th and 6th regiments of the Guizhou army. The 6th Regiment served as the right flank of the 1st Army of the National Protection Army. In June, after Yuan Shikai's death, Beijing appointed Liu to the position of Dujun, with Dai Kan becoming the civil governor. In August, Dai was transferred to the Office of Military Affairs of Sichuan, with the post of civil governor passed on to Liu Xianshi. Liu Xianshi consolidated his military and civil political power in Guizhou and implemented internal military rule. He supported Tang Jiyao's expansion into Sichuan, and formed and lead the Guizhou clique.

As the Liu family hailed from Xingyi, their group is called the Xingyi clique to differentiate them from the Tongzi clique, which would be led by Zhou Xicheng. The Xingyi clique itself was split into the Old and New factions. Liu Xianshi, with Liu Xianzhi, Liu Xianqian, and other members of the Liu family formed the backbone of the Old Xingyi clique, and Xiong Fanyu, He Linshu, Zhang Xielu, and Guo Chongguang were called the "Four Pillars" of the clique. Xiong Fanyu was responsible for helping the Liu family with their schooling during the late Qing, and was the father-in-law of Liu Xianshi's son, Liu Gongliang, as well as serving as Liu Xianshi's secretary and the leader of the Guizhou branch of the Bank of China. He Linshu was one of the main leaders of the Constitutionalists in Guizhou and the father-in-law to Liu Xianshi's second son, Liu Junzhuo, who served as the director of the Guizhou Government Office. Zhang Xielu, who helped the Liu family with schooling in Xingyi, served as the director of the Finance Department under Liu Xianshi. These "Pillars" became the backbone for an organization of merchants and landlords in Guizhou known as the Qilaohui. Liu used his son, Liu Gangwu, as his emissary to Sun Yat-Sen. Liu Xianqian was placed into power in Western Guizhou, placing him in direct control of Xingyi. Wang Wenhua, Liu's nephew, rose to the position of division commander. Wang's brother-in-law, He Yingqin, was a brigade commander as well as Chief of Staff in the Guizhou army. Wang's older brother, Wang Boqun, served as Liu's emissary.

While in power, Liu Xianshi expanded his army greatly. During a political crisis in 1916, Liu sent 400000 yuan to Shanghai from his treasury as an emergency fund in case he lost power. Liu Xianzhi and Liu Xianqian were each accused for taking 200000 yuan from Guizhou public funds.

=== Liu–Wang conflict ===
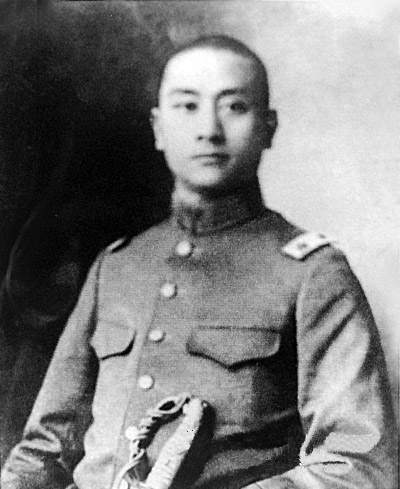
Wang Wenhua, a progressive reformer in the Guizhou clique basing his power in the military, opposed to Liu Xianshi, his uncle.

Wang Wenhua's position had gone from division commander to commander-in-chief of the Guizhou army. Despite receiving no formal military training, Wang rose up through the ranks due to his relationship with the Liu family. Evidence suggests that the Liu and Wang clans of Guizhou had conflicts in the past, and that it was resolved through marriage, making Wang Wenhua Liu Xianshi's nephew. Wang also married one of Liu's nieces, strengthening their ties. However, even though Liu and Wang were close, they had political differences. Wang was an avid supporter of the revolutionaries, with progressive views similar to those of Sun Yat-sen. During the National Protection War, while Liu had been reluctant to fully commit to the war, Wang was strong in his support for Cai E and the anti-Yuan forces. Wang had even told Liu that he would lead troops into Sichuan, and that Liu could save himself by saying that Wang had rebelled and was acting outside of his control. Liu finally agreed to let Wang go to Sichuan.

Wang had previously joined the Kuomintang (then known as the Chinese Revolutionary Party) during a 1917 visit to Shanghai. Wang was unhappy with politics in Guizhou, and many members of the Liu family complained to Liu Xianshi about his tolerance of Wang and warned him of Wang being too powerful militarily. These warnings were largely ignored by Liu. Liu did, however, have a separate military force under the command of Liu Xianqian. Wang, as commander-in-chief, chose his subordinates based on their similar political views to him. Wang looked for people who had military training and could help him modernize Guizhou. Along with his brother Wang Boqun, Wang gathered a group of young officers from Guizhou who had studied at the Tokyo Shinbu Gakko, who had, while studying in Japan, started to support Sun Yat-sen's views. Among these officers was He Yingqin, who would later become an important part of the Republic of China Army under Chiang Kai-shek.

Wang Wenhua believed in reform to better his home province, especially with a stronger military. He attempted to use his military power in Guizhou to implement Sun Yat-sen's revolutionary program, leading to the distinction between the Civilian Faction of Liu Xianshi and the Military Faction of Wang Wenhua, the former of which was made up of Xinhai-era reformers, and the latter of which was made up of May Fourth-era military professionals. At the center of Wang's plan was the Guizhou Military Academy, formed at the end of the Qing Empire. In 1917, Wang was successful in recruiting able young officers, and he rejected applications from candidates with relations to Liu Xianshi. In August 1917, Liu Xianshi and Liu Xianqian established a separate military academy in Xingyi called the Suiying School. The Suiying school and the Guizhou Military Academy had an intense rivalry, with the Suiying school having many instructors that were not well-educated on military affairs and who had never had any battlefield experience. In contrast, the Guizhou Military Academy, with its Japanese-style military education, was so popular it even began to draw students from neighboring provinces. Wang expelled many students who were caught spying for the Suiying school and passing information about the inner workings of the Guizhou Military Academy to Liu Xianshi, with Wang and He going to great lengths to carefully examining candidates. The Suiying school, due to its worse quality, only produced 2 classes of graduates before closing. The Guizhou Military Academy had He as the commandant, and had produced 495 graduates by 5 years.

Another important factor in Wang Wenhua's support was his endorsement of the Guizhou student movement. With influence from the New Culture Movement, newspapers in Guizhou by 1917 had started to print articles on Western ideas. Students began to discuss politics and ideology or demand for the curricula to be reformed to add certain subjects. In late 1918, Wang Wenhua and He Yingqin created a new student organization named the Young Guizhou Association, inspired by the Young China Students' Association in Beijing (which had been created in June) and modeled on Giuseppe Mazzini's Young Italy. The Young Guizhou Association called for students to call for the modernization of the province, increasing Wang's political power and taking the Liu–Wang conflict from the military scene to the student and civilian scene. He Yingqin was the nominal director of the movement, while Wang worked behind the scenes to hide his involvement. He described in his speeches the purpose of the movement – that Guizhou was an "old, sick man" and that the young would have to revitalize it. The main message of the Young Guizhou Association was this:

To sacrifice themselves for the country, to unite with the masses to protect the country, to advance learning and knowledge, and to exercise and develop their bodies.

In response to the creation of the Young Guizhou Association, Liu Xianshi created his own student organization, named the Republic of China Patriotic Students' Association, with much of its message taken from the Young Guizhou Association, in order to turn young people away from Wang Wenhua and He Yingqin's student organization. In early March 1919, the Young Guizhou Association started publishing the Young Guizhou Association Daily newspaper, which advocated for political and social change in Guizhou and became one of the leading voices of reformist and revolutionary activism. Liu Xianshi, at the time, attended a rally held jointly by the Young Guizhou Association as well as the Patriotic Students' Association. By spring 1919, the Young Guizhou Association completely dominated the Guizhou student movement.

With influence from events in Beijing and the Treaty of Versailles, Guizhou students in Hunan organized a National Salvation Association, with 600 members. Wang Wenhua himself saw the Beijing Government's foreign policy as a failure due to the Shandong Problem. Students of the Institute of Law and Politics in Guiyang considered making a Guizhou branch of the National Student Alliance, which happened in June as representatives from national student movement alliances came to Guiyang. In May 1919, Young Guizhou Association leaders met with representatives from 81 counties in order to create a new representative body for the Guizhou student movement named the Guizhou National People's Assembly, with more than 1000 people attending its first session in June. When the May Fourth Movement spread to Guiyang, He Yingqin, as well as Zhang Pengnian, Zhang Xielu's brother and Chairman of the Guizhou Provincial Assembly, went to the National Citizen's Meeting in Guiyang on June 1, 1919. He led the Young Guizhou Association in a parade and delivered a keynote speech at the meeting.

Liu Xianshi attempted to limit the Young Guizhou Association's influence as it was becoming a political threat to him. Zhang Xielu's brother, Zhang Pengnian, who was the director of Nanming Middle School, convened the school body to warn them against political activism. He recommended to the students that they save the nation through studying instead of demonstration. He banned all student activities that were not approved by him. Likewise, Liu Xianshi's cousin, Liu Jingwu, who was the president of the Institute of Law and Politics, reprimanded his students in a similar way. Liu Xianshi also made it so that students could not graduate or move up grades if they missed at least one third of their classes.

Wang Boqun, who was an emissary of Liu Xianshi, met Zhao Shijin, an overseas Chinese man who had previously helped Sun Yat-sen with funding infrastructure projects in China. Wang talked to Zhao about a plan to build a railroad from Chongqing to Luzhou through Guiyang. Zhao agreed to raise 5 million dollars to fund the project, signing an agreement in March 1919 which said that the Guizhou Provincial Assembly would have to authorize the construction of the railway within 3 months. Liu Xianshi initially supported the project, but Wang Wenhua proposed that 1 out of the 5 million sent would be used for the army. Some others proposed that the money would be used for completely different things. Zhang Xielu and Chen Tingce, Liu's supporters, were dissatisfied with Wang's proposal due to their dislike of Wang's growing political power as well as the unwillingness to take on too much debt. Zhang demanded that the loan would be restricted to 2 million dollars, and for the money only to be applied for infrastructure investments. Zhang, in a several hundred page long report, detailed his opposition to the loan and to the railroad, which changed Liu's mind.

Wang Wenhua and He Yingqin had formed a committee for the renovation of the Guizhou provincial government. They persuaded Ren Kecheng to chair the committee, who proposed that Liu Xianshi step down as military governor (Dujun) and appoint Wang in his stead, keeping Liu as civilian governor and handing over military power to Wang. Liu was furious and rejected the proposals, leading to a further divide between Liu and Wang. By late 1919, Wang had been using force to attack people who had disagreed with the loan and railroad project. It was, by then, clear that Wang was determined to remove Liu from power, but was kept from doing so, possibly from familial relations.

In late 1919, the Young Guizhou Association launched a campaign against Zhang Xielu, denouncing him in a demonstration. His home was broken into, and many soldiers had joined in the demonstration. Another major protest against Zhang was planned to be on December 3, 1919, where local beggars would join in a mob to participate in a "Poor People's Conference" calling for Zhang's trial. The Young Guizhou Association Daily published several articles on Zhang's alleged mishandling of provincial finance. Wang plotted against Chen Tingce, sending an assassin after him. After a banquet at Wang Wenhua's house attended by multiple leaders of the Guizhou clique (including Liu Xianshi) to discuss provincial affairs on November 26, 1919, an assassin shot twice at Chen at 11 p.m., leaving him wounded. The would-be-assassin was never caught.

== The Minjiu Incident ==
=== Setup ===
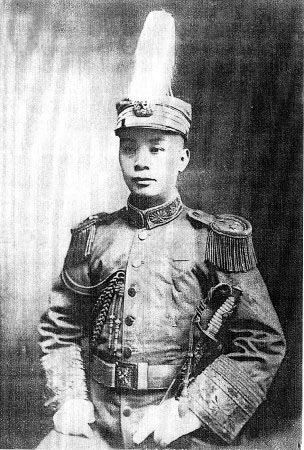
Lu Tao, photographed March 1921

In early 1920, the Guizhou army accompanied Tang Jiyao in his invasion of Sichuan against then-governor of Sichuan Xiong Kewu. Wang Wenhua led the army, staying for several months in the province. Tang Jiyao shared Liu Xianshi's distaste for Wang – Some sources claim that Tang sent a secret telegram to Liu, saying that Wang was unfit for command due to his lack of any formal military training and his over-reliance on his subordinate officers. Other sources claim that Liu wanted to remove Wang himself, and initiated the plan to remove him.

Nevertheless, Wang Wenhua learned of the plot. He conversed with two of his subordinates, Zhu Shaoliang and Gu Zhenglun, about the plan to remove Liu Xianshi from power. Wang told Liu that he was withdrawing his troops from Sichuan due to a Yunnanese withdrawal. He ordered deputy commander Lu Tao to take the army back South to Guiyang to "sweep out the princes" and dismantle Liu Xianshi's power, while Wang himself sailed to Shanghai. Zhang Pengnian claims that before he left, Wang drew up two lists of names with Gu – one for those who were to be immediately assassinated, and the other for those who would be observed and possibly killed in the future.

In October 1920, Guizhou forces left for Guiyang through Zunyi. Gu Zhenglun ordered Sun Jianfeng to lead his troops to Guiyang, to where he arrived in early November. On November 10, Sun met with He Yingqin to look over the assassination list. He Yingqin favored cutting the list down, but Sun favored adding names to the list in order to destroy Liu Xianshi's faction easier. Provincial assemblyman Zhang Shiren was invited to mediate, and the list was finalized to four people – Guo Chongguang, Xiong Fanyu, He Linshu, and Ding Yizhong, the "four pillars" of the Old Xingyi Clique. After they were dead, Wang Wenhua planned to force Liu Xianshi to step down from his post as governor.

Liu Xianshi, through his spies, learned that there was a plot against him. However, he did not know of the details. To keep himself safe, he ordered Zhang Xianqian to take his troops from Xingyi to Guiyang. Liu also consulted Yuan Zuming, one of his supporters who was a subordinate of Wang Wenhua, to sow disorder from within Wang's faction.

=== Execution ===
On the night of November 10, 1920, random shots were fired in random parts of Guiyang, starting the coup. Wang's soldiers blocked the streets. Sun Jianfeng had designated different squads to capture the men on the assassination list. When taking Guo Chongguang away, the squad assigned to him claimed that Liu Xianshi wanted to see him. When his young son cried and complained that his father was being taken away, a soldier shot the boy in the head. Guo was taken to a bridge outside the North gate of Guiyang, where they set him on a butcher's table and beheaded him. The squad assigned to Xiong Fanyu had scared Xiong, who believed they were robbers. Xiong asked them to take anything but to not do harm, to which a soldier replied that they had come to take his life, but not his belongings. Xiong was taken into his courtyard and also beheaded. He Linshu, hearing the initial shots of the coup, climbed over his neighbor's wall, where he hid. The squad that was to kill him instead took his two sons and his nephew, beheading them in the street. He later returned to his house and snuck out of Guiyang, pretending to be a diseased man in a palanquin. Ding Yizhong hid in his house and fled the city.

Sun Jianfeng put the heads of Guo Chengguang and Xiong Fanyu in a barrel, sending them to Gu Zhenglun. Gu later ordered the heads to be publicly shown and spoke about the "crimes" they had committed against Guizhou.

=== Aftermath ===
Liu Xianshi spent the entirety of the Minjiu incident in his own compound. Over the next few days following the death of his allies, surrounded by his private guards, Liu learnt of the fates of his associates. Liu, seeing the danger to his life, resigned his positions and returned to Xingyi. Liu was at first held back, but he threatened that he would kill himself unless he was allowed to go. He then turned to ask his sister (Wang Wenhua's mother) for her protection, persuading Wang's faction to let him go on November 18, and personally accompanying him to Anshun, and then Xingyi. At Anshun, Liu met with Liu Xianqian and his army, going on to Xingyi. Sun Jianfeng ordered Lin Zixian to assassinate him on the way, which he refused to do.

He Yingqin quickly put into action the next phase of the plan, which was installing Ren Kecheng as acting governor until Wang Wenhua returned. However, Ren refused to participate in the plan and fled to Anshun. He was found by soldiers and taken back to Guiyang, but he escaped again, this time hiding in a Catholic church with Xiong Fanyu's brother and Chen Tingce. With Ren gone, the post of acting provincial governor was given to Zhou Hongbin. Gui Baizhu claims that instead of Zhou, Lu Tao was installed as acting provincial governor.

Wang Wenhua, in Shanghai, stayed away from the chaos in Guizhou. He had brought funds with him so that he could strengthen and equip the Guizhou army. Liu's supporters went to Shanghai with him, and in March 1921, as Wang stepped into a car outside his hotel, assassins sent by Yuan Zuming shot and killed him, ending the Liu-Wang conflict.

Liu Xianshi, who had fled to Kunming, returned to Guiyang in April 1923 with Yunnanese troops, who restored him to power.

== Rule of Yuan Zuming ==
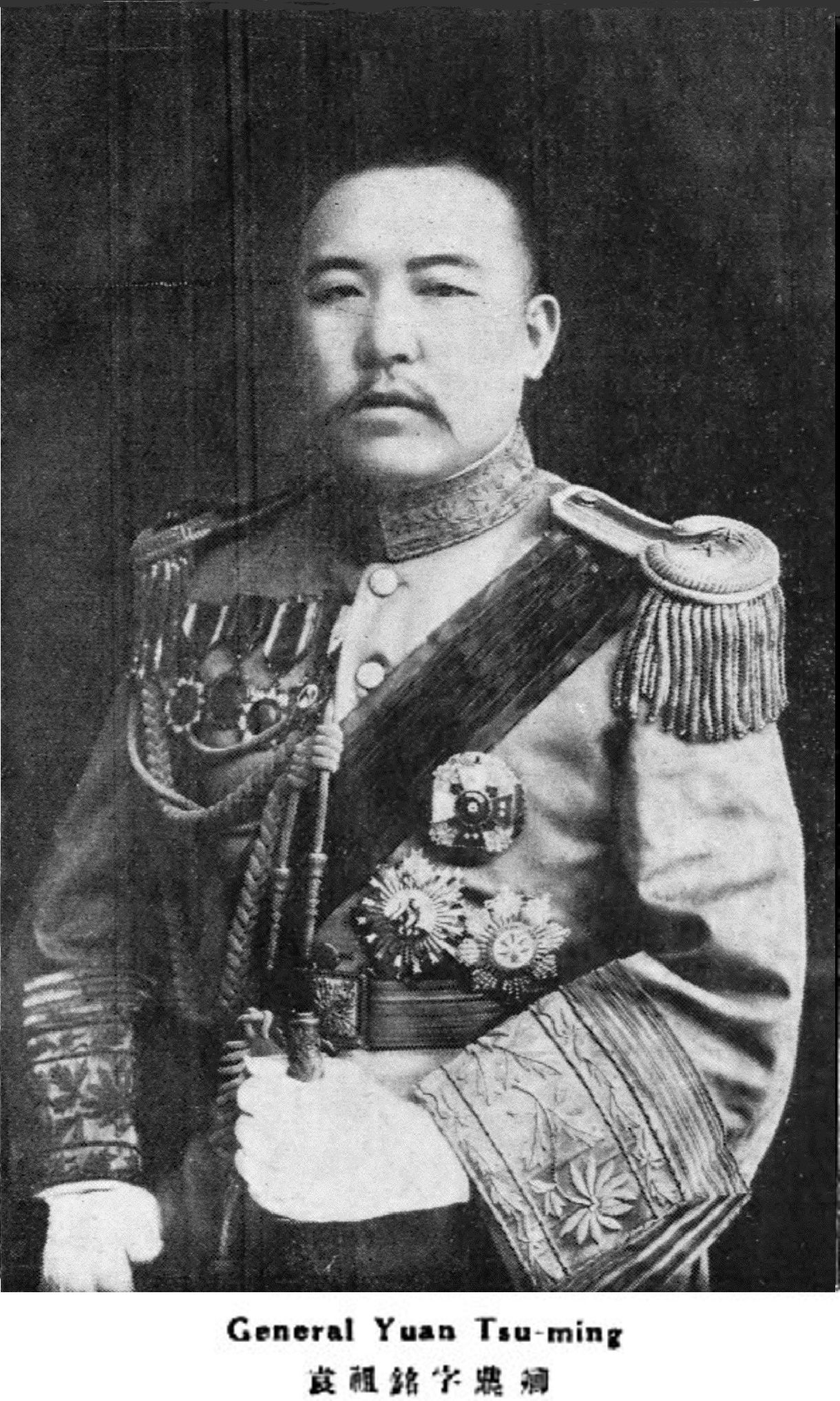
Yuan Zuming, former subordinate of Liu Xianshi and governor of Guizhou

In April 1920, Yuan Zuming, receiving financial support from Beijing, organized the Qianding Army in Wuchang and served as its commander-in-chief. In April 1922, Yuan expelled Lu Tao, who was supported by the Southern government, from Guiyang. Yuan, occupying Guiyang, claimed the position of commander-in-chief of the Guizhou Army. In August, he assumed the title of civilian governor of Guizhou. However, he gradually came into conflict with Tang Jiyao. In April 1923, Tang Jiyu, Tang Jiyao's brother, led the Yunnan Army to occupy Guiyang, assuming his position as Governor. Yuan was expelled from Guizhou and fled to Sichuan, where he fought with the Sichuan clique warlords. In March 1924, Yuan was appointed to the Sichuan-Guizhou Border Inspection Office by the government in Beijing and made the Chief of the 34th Division.

From 1924 onwards, Yuan Zuming made peace with Tang Jiyao. In January 1925, Yuan was appointed as military governor of Guizhou. However, he continued to participate in the civil war in Sichuan, and he left governing to his subordinates – Wang Tianpei, Peng Hanzhang, and Zhou Xicheng. In June 1925, Yuan and commander of the Sichuan Army Liu Xiang attacked Sichuan general Yang Sen and won. Soon after, Liu and Yang became allies, attacking Yuan. In May 1926, Yuan was defeated in battle by forces in Sichuan and fled to western Hunan.
