= Yunnan–Guangxi War =

1925 conflict in the Republic of China

Yunnan-Guangxi War
Date	March 1925 – February 1927
Location	South China
Result	Chiang Kai-shek victory

Belligerents
Yunnan clique Supported by: France	(Republic of China (1912–1949)) National Revolutionary Army; Supported by: Soviet Union

Commanders and leaders
Tang Jiyao; Chen Jiongming	(Republic of China (1912–1949)) Chiang Kai-shek (Republic of China (1912–1949)) Hu Hanmin (Republic of China (1912–1949)) Li Zongren

Casualties and losses
- Thousands of civilians killed

The Yunnan–Guangxi War was a war of succession fought for control of the Chinese Nationalist Party after the death of Sun Yat-sen in 1925. It was launched by the Yunnan clique against the party leadership and the New Guangxi clique.

On 18 March 1925--six days after Sun's death--Tang Jiyao, leader of the Yunnan clique, claimed to be the rightful leader of the Kuomintang against acting generalissimo Hu Hanmin and party executives. He had been a revolutionary since the Qing dynasty and was one of the most prominent leaders of the National Protection War against Yuan Shikai, co-founded the Constitutional Protection Movement and assisted Sun during the Guangdong-Guangxi War and Chen Jiongming's rebellion. Despite this, his relationship with Sun was not solid. He had previously negotiated with the Beiyang government and other northern warlords, resisted Sun's call for the Northern Expedition and was unwilling to provide the National Assembly long-term shelter during the Guangdong-Guangxi War. Sun had also recognized the authority of Gu Pinzhen, who had briefly overthrown Tang in 1921.

Given that he was the most accomplished and famous general in the Kuomintang, Tang believed he was the natural leader of the national revolution. He justified his claim by noting that Sun had named him his "deputy generalissimo" in 1924. In actuality, Tang had declined this position when he learned it was inferior to Hu Hanmin's "vice generalissimo" rank. The party leaders denounced Tang as a usurper. Frustrated, he rallied his allies in Yunnan and Guizhou to lead an expedition to Guangzhou. Hu Hanmin requested the New Guangxi clique to form a defense. Li Zongren successfully routed Tang's invading armies during the summer. His stature rose as a result of the war, and he later became the acting president.

The fortunes of the previously obscure Chiang Kai-shek also rose during the war. In August, the right-wing Hu Hanmin was blamed for the assassination of fellow party executive Liao Zhongkai and was arrested and exiled by Chiang and Wang Jingwei. Chiang took over Gen. Xu Chongzhi's role as commander of the KMT's military, since Xu was suspected of either taking part in the assassination, knowing about it or was simply incompetent in providing security (Xu was a replacement for his mutinous superior, Chen Jiongming). Many KMT right-wing leaders were demoted, like Lin Sen and Dai Jitao. This effectively made Chiang the second most powerful person in the KMT after Wang Jingwei.

In September Chen Jiongming launched his final rebellion in Guangdong, which was crushed by Chiang. Chen and Tang became allies and were elected premier and vice premier, respectively, of the new China Public Interest Party in San Francisco on October. The party advocated federalism and multi-party democracy; it moved its headquarters to Hong Kong in 1926.

Chiang Kai-shek eventually ousted Wang Jingwei following the Zhongshan Warship Incident in the spring of 1926. After the Nationalists' successful Northern Expedition, many of Tang's generals wanted to realign themselves with the Kuomintang. Long Yun forced Tang into retirement in February 1927. Tang died three months later at the age of 43.
