= Battle of Xuzhou (1916) =

The Battle of Xuzhou
- Part of the National Protection War and WWI
Date	January 18, 1916 – March 20, 1916
Location	Xuzhou, China
Result	Republic of China victory

Belligerents
(Republic of China (1912–1949)) Republic of China: Yunnan clique	Empire of China

Commanders and leaders
(Republic of China (1912–1949)) Liu Yunfeng	Feng Yuxiang

The Battle of Xuzhou took place from January, 18th to March 18, 1916, and was a major battle of the National Protection War.

== Timeline ==
This battle began when Liu Yunfeng's forces invaded Xuzhou from Yunnan and on January 21 captured the city. Feng Yuxiang forces then recaptured the city. A few days after the city was captured by Liu Yunfeng's forces. Liu Yunfeng's forces received reinforcements to attack Xuzhou, as it was an important city in Sichuan and was necessary for the Republic of China to capture. on March 20 Republic of China recaptured the city and then launched an attack on Luzhou.
