= Cheng Qian =

Chinese army officer and politician

- 程潛
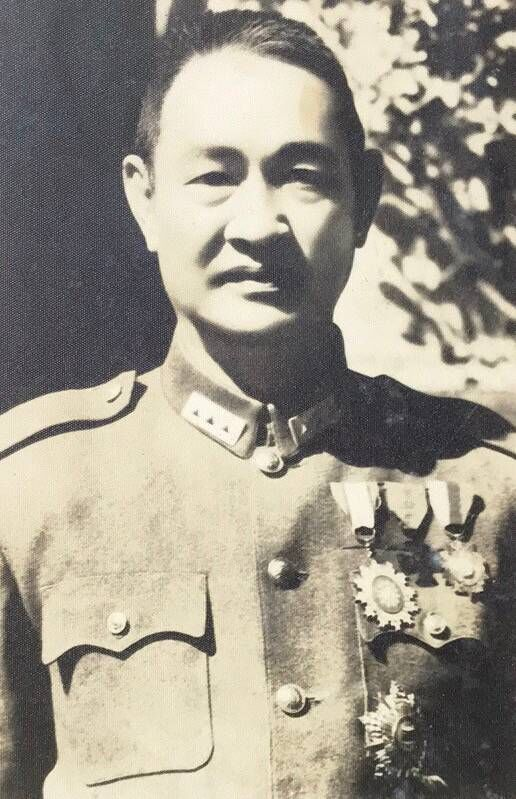
- Cheng Qian

Governor of Hunan
- In office 1948–1949
- Chairman: Mao Zedong
- Preceded by: Wang Dongyuan
- Succeeded by: Chen Mingren
- In office 1952–1967
- Preceded by: Wang Shoudao
- Succeeded by: Li Yuan

Personal details
- Born: March 31, 1882 Liling, Hunan, Qing dynasty, China
- Died: April 5, 1968 (aged 86) Beijing, People's Republic of China
- Party: Revolutionary Committee of the Chinese Kuomintang
- Awards: Order of Blue Sky and White Sun; Order of the Sacred Tripod

Military service
- Allegiance: Republic of China; China
- Rank: General

Cheng Qian (simplified Chinese: 程潜; traditional Chinese: 程潛; pinyin: Chéng Qián; Wade–Giles: Ch'eng Ch'ien; 31 March 1882 – 5 April 1968) was a Chinese army officer and politician who held important military and political positions in both the Republic of China and the People's Republic of China. Educated at the Imperial Japanese Army Academy and Waseda University, he first met Sun Yat-sen in Tokyo, becoming an early supporter. Later, under Chiang Kai-shek, he was one of the most powerful members of the Kuomintang, notably serving as Chief of Staff of the Military Affairs Commission during the Second Sino–Japanese War.

In August 1949, as Governor of Hunan, he peacefully surrendered to Mao Zedong's advancing Communist forces, joined the Revolutionary Committee of the Kuomintang and, after the founding of the People's Republic of China, went on to serve as Vice Chairman of the Central Military Commission (1949–1968), Governor of Hunan (1952–1967) and Vice Chairman of the National People's Congress (1954–1968), among other posts.

== Early life and education ==
Born into a prosperous landlord family in Liling, Hunan, Cheng received a classical Confucian education and at the age of the 16 he obtained the Xiucai (the first degree in the imperial civil service examination), and then studied at the Yuelu Academy in Changsha. Here he began to understand the current political situation and decided to give up a civil career in favor of the military, and so entered the Hunan Military Academy, being then sent to study in Japan at the Tokyo Shimbu Gakko, a military official preparatory academy. While in Tokyo, he met Huang Xing, Li Liejun, and Song Jiaoren, future nationalist leaders, who fascinated him with their ideas.

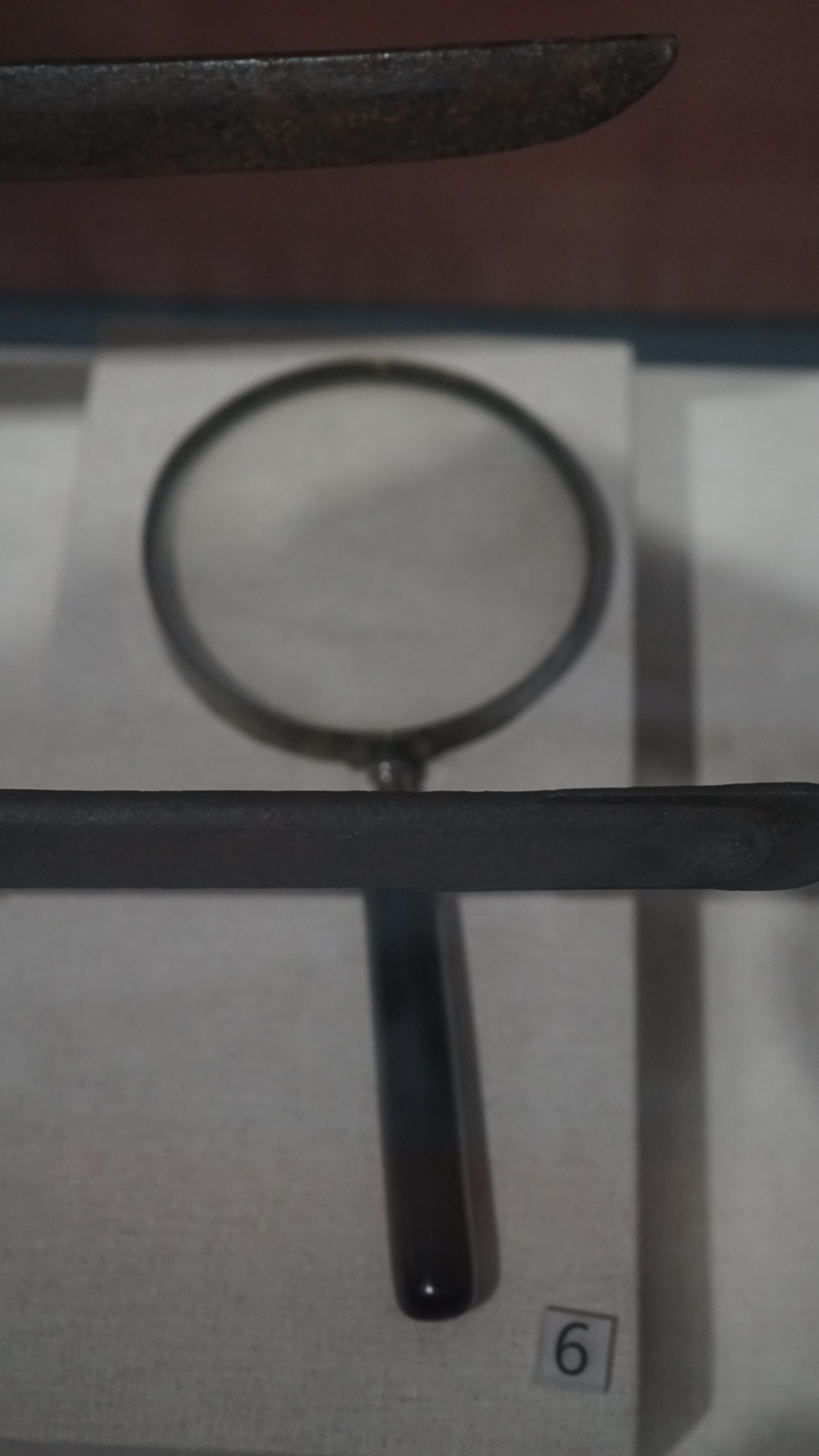
Magnifying glass Cheng Qian used during the Northern Expedition

In 1905 Cheng met Sun Yat-sen and joined the Tongmenghui, a secret revolutionary society, committed to overthrow the Qing dynasty and modernize China. In 1907, Cheng graduated from the Imperial Japanese Army Academy as an artillery lieutenant (artillery, especially field artillery was to be his specialty throughout his military career). One of his classmates was Tang Jiyao.

Cheng then returned in China, where he was assigned by the Qing imperial government to train a New Army in Sichuan Province under the overall command of Zhu Qinglan.

== Republic of China ==
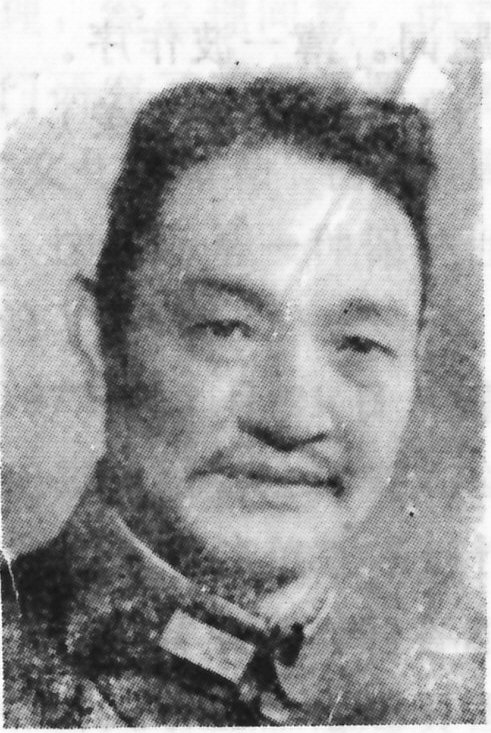
Chen Qian

After the outbreak of the Xinhai Revolution, Cheng took part in the Wuchang Uprising and immediately after he participated in the Battle of Changsha.

With the establishment of the Republic of China, Cheng was appointed military commander of Hunan. However, as Yuan Shikai staged his coup to control the Republic, Cheng tried to revolt, but then fled to Japan, where he joined the Kuomintang and entered Waseda University, studying for a degree in Political Economy.

Shortly after, Yuan Shikai tried to proclaim himself Emperor, causing the National Protection War. Cheng returned to Hunan to enlist rebel soldiers in Cai E's army. During the Constitutional Protection Movement he was first appointed military commander of Changsha, then Deputy Minister of War in Sun Yat-sen's Guangzhou Government. He was put in charge of training troops in Guangzhou, and then took part in the Northern Expedition. From 1925 to 1927 he was the General commanding the 6th Army, and briefly served as Chairman of the Government of the Hunan Province in 1928. In 1926 he was elected a member of the Central Executive Committee of the Kuomintang. It was in these years that Cheng first met and collaborated with Mao Zedong, as the Kuomintang and the Communists were working together during this time under the direction of the Soviet Union (namely, the First United Front), with Mao at one time serving as Cheng's assistant in political and propaganda affairs.

In the following years, Cheng served in several capacities, including Chief of General Staff of the Military Affairs Commission (which was chaired by Chiang Kai-shek himself) from 1935 to 1937. When the Second Sino–Japanese War began, Cheng Qian was made Commander in Chief of the 1st War Zone in July 1937, responsible for defending Beijing (then named Beiping), Hebei and the strategic Beijing–Hankou railway, while also concurrently serving as Governor of Henan Province from 1937 to 1939.

Cheng Qian was recalled from the 1st War Zone in 1938 to serve as Director of the Generalissimo's Headquarters. From 1940 to 1944 he was Vice Chairman and Deputy Chief of Staff of the Military Affairs Commission, and from 1944 to 1945 he was acting Chief of Staff.

After the war ended, Cheng sided with the conciliatory faction in the Kuomintang. In 1947 he was elected in the Legislative Yuan (in the first election after 14 years) and contested the Vice Presidency of the Republic of China in March 1948, losing it to Li Zongren. Afterwards, he was appointed Governor of his native Hunan once again.

== People's Republic of China ==
As the Chinese Communist Party forces gained ground, Chiang Kai-shek stepped down in January 1949; after the collapse of peace talks in April, the People's Liberation Army crossed the Yangtze River. Cheng Qian in early August decided to surrender, and so Hunan was peacefully handed over to Mao Zedong's forces.

Invited by Mao to Beijing to attend the Inaugural Session of the Chinese People's Political Consultative Conference, Cheng was then appointed to very significant offices in the new Communist People's Republic. Notably, he served as:

- Vice Chairman of the Central Military Commission (1949–1968)
- Governor of Hunan (1952–1967)
- Vice Chairman of the National People's Congress (1954–1968)
- Vice Chairman of the Revolutionary Committee of the Kuomintang (1956–1968)
- Vice Chairman of the Central–South Military and Government Administration Council, responsible for overseeing political and military affairs in Guangdong, Hainan, Henan, Hubei, Hunan and Guangxi (1949–1954)

During the Cultural Revolution, Cheng Qian was among the non-communists that Mao Zedong and Zhou Enlai prevented from being attacked. In Hunan, he was succeeded by Li Yuan after a revolutionary committee under Li Yuan's chairmanship was formed there. He died in Beijing on 15 April 1968 aged 86.

Government offices
Preceded by Wang Dongyuan	Governor of Hunan; 1948–1949	Succeeded by Chen Mingren
Preceded by Wang Shoudao	Governor of Hunan; 1952–1967	Succeeded by Li Yuan
