= Lu Han (general) =

Chinese general (1895–1974)

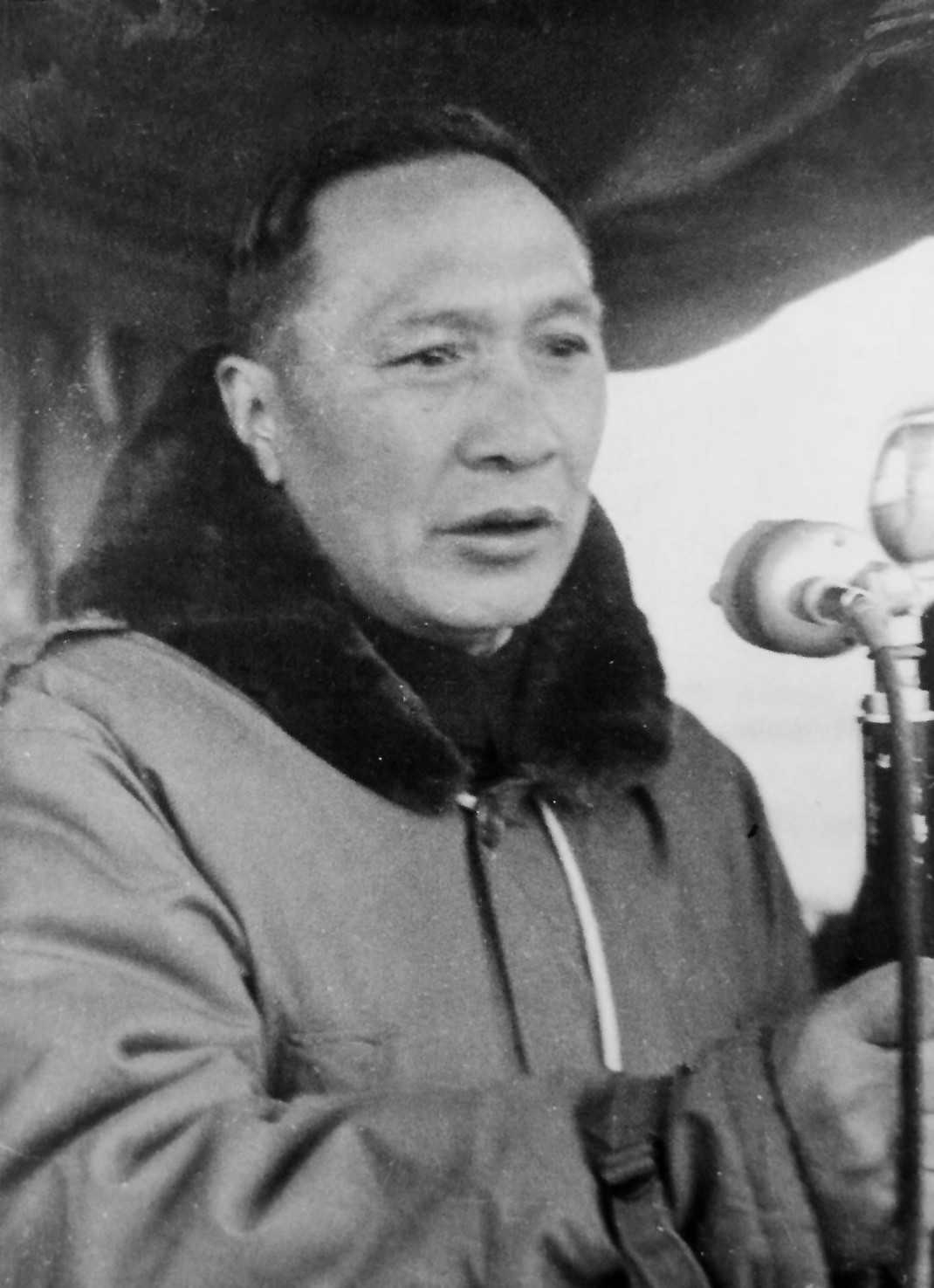
- Lu Han in 1950

Governor of Yunnan
- In office 1 December 1945 – 9 December 1949
- President: Chiang Kai-shek
- Preceded by: Long Yun; Li Zonghuang (acting)
- Succeeded by: Li Mi

Military Governor of North Indochina (Chinese occupation of northern Indochina)
- In office 14 September 1945 – 14 May 1946
- President: Chiang Kai-shek
- Preceded by: Yuitsu Tsuchihashi (Japanese occupation); Tsuyoshi Tsukamoto (acting)
- Succeeded by: Georges Thierry d'Argenlieu (High commissioner)

Personal details
- Born: 6 February 1895 Zhaotong, Yunnan Province, Qing Empire
- Died: 13 May 1974 (aged 79) Beijing, People's Republic of China
- Party: Kuomintang (until 1949) Chinese Communist Party (1949–1974)
- Education: Yunnan Military Academy

Military service
- Allegiance: Republic of China; China
- Branch/service: Yunnan clique (1922–1927); National Revolutionary Army (1927–1947); Republic of China Army (1947–1949)
- Years of service: 1922–1949
- Rank: General (2nd Class)
- Battles/wars: Second Sino-Japanese War; Battle of Taierzhuang; Battle of Wuhan; Battle of Changsha; Chinese Civil War; Chinese occupation of northern Vietnam, 1945–1946

Lu Han
- Traditional Chinese: 盧漢
- Simplified Chinese: 卢汉
Transcriptions
Standard Mandarin
- Hanyu Pinyin: Lú Hàn

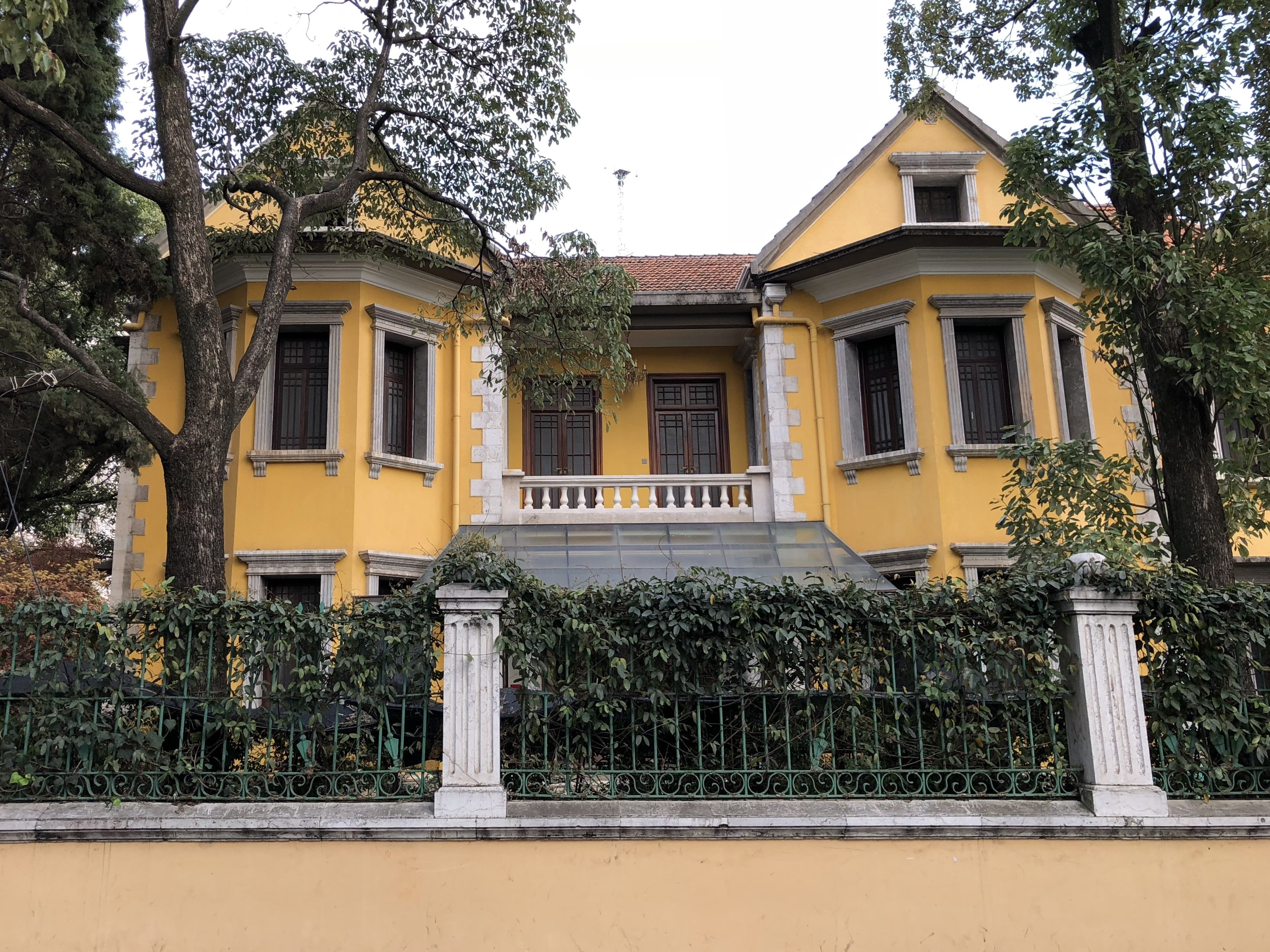
Lu Han residence

Lu Han (simplified Chinese: 卢汉; traditional Chinese: 盧漢; pinyin: Lú Hàn; 6 February 1895 – 13 May 1974) was a Chinese general of Yi ethnicity, who served in important military and political positions under both the Republic of China and the People's Republic of China. A prominent warlord of Yunnan, he was closely associated with Long Yun, who was first an ally and then a rival, although both ended up collaborating with the Chinese Communist Party (CCP).

A graduate of the Yunnan Military Academy, Lu Han notably commanded the 1st Group Army during the Second Sino-Japanese War. After the CCP victory in the Chinese Civil War, he joined the Revolutionary Committee of the Chinese Kuomintang, and went on to serve as Vice President of the National Sports Commission (today the General Administration of Sport), member of both the National People's Congress and Chinese People's Political Consultative Conference, as well as Vice Chairman of the Southwest China Military and Political Committee.

== Military career and Republic of China ==
Born in Zhaotong, Lu Han studied at the Yunnan Military Academy and joined the Yunnan Army, serving under Long Yun for many years. Long and Lu had a close relationship with each other, and there were rumors that Lu Han was Long Yun's half-brother, but this was denied by Long Yun's son Long Shengwu. In 1914, Lu Han married Long Yun's cousin Long Zeqing. In 1937, he served as commander of the 60th Army of the National Revolutionary Army of the Republic of China, with more than 40,000 troops.

In 1938, he participated in the Battle of Taierzhuang. Subsequently, the 60th Army was reorganized into the 30th Army, and later expanded into the 1st Army. Lu Han served as the commander of the Army and participated in the Battle of Wuhan. In 1939, he commanded units in the Battle of Changsha.

In 1945, Long Yun was overthrown and removed from the governorship of Yunnan by Chiang Kai-shek. Chiang made Lu Han Chairman of the Yunnan Provincial Government.

In early 1945, the General Headquarters of the Yunnan-Vietnam Border Region was reorganized into the 1st Front Army, and Lu Han was promoted to the rank of full General. On August 15, Japan unconditionally surrendered, and Lu Han led the 60th Army, 93rd Army, and Guan Linzheng's 9th Army (in total 200,000 troops) to Hanoi, Vietnam. On September 28, Lu presided over a ceremony at the Hanoi headquarters (formerly the French Governor's Office in Tonkin or North Vietnam) to accept the surrender of the Japanese 38th Army Commander Yuitsu Tsuchihashi on behalf of the Allied Powers.

== People's Republic of China ==
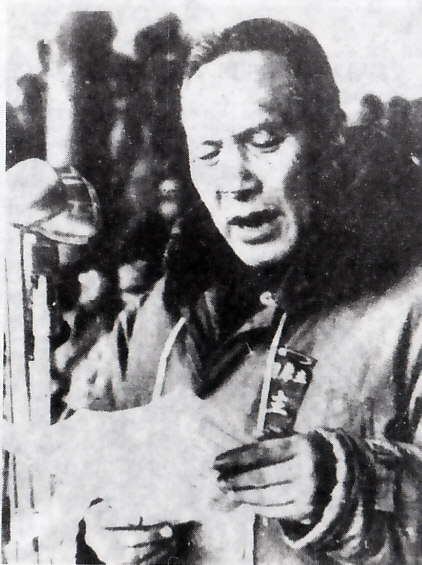
Lu Han

As the CCP gained the upper hand in the Chinese Civil War, Lu Han, on February 5, 1949, ordered the Kunming Branch of the Central Bank to stop the transportation of gold and silver to the Nationalist central government; later, he met with journalists in Hong Kong, indicating that he had broken with Chiang Kai-shek. Soon, the 36th Army of the Second Field Army of the People's Liberation Army entered Guizhou. On November 3, 1949, Li Zongren, as acting president, flew to Kunming with Zhang Qun and Hong Lanyou to encourage Lu Han not to break with the Nationalist Government. On the evening of December 9, Lu Han placed Zhang Qun under house arrest and issued a notice in Zhang Qun's name to hold an emergency meeting in Lu Han's residence. In his capacity as the Chairman of the Yunnan Provincial Government, Lu Han announced that Yunnan had joined the People's Republic of China. On December 10, Lu sent a telegram to general Liu Wenhui in Chengdu, asking Liu to arrest Chiang Kai-shek, who was in the city (Chengdu was the last large mainland city to fall to the CCP).

On February 20, 1950, Chen Geng and Song Renqiong led a PLA force into Kunming, where they were warmly welcomed by Lu Han. On February 22, Chen Geng announced that Yunnan had been completely occupied or peacefully liberated with no major confrontation. In March 1950, the Yunnan Provincial Military and Political Committee was established, with Lu Han as the chairman.

Mao Zedong appointed Lu Han to several important positions; he served as a member and Vice Chairman of the Southwest China Military and Political Committee, a representative of the National People's Congress, a member of the National Committee of the Chinese People's Political Consultative Conference, member of the Central Military Commission, Vice President of the National Sports Commission under Marshal He Long, member of the Central Committee of the Revolutionary Committee of the Chinese Kuomintang, and member of the Working Committee for the Peaceful Liberation of Taiwan.

In 1956, Lu Han participated in the Chinese delegation to visit Nikita Khrushchev in Moscow.

On May 13, 1974, Lu Han died in Beijing at the age of 79 due to lung cancer. On May 18, a memorial service for Lu Han was held in Beijing. Marshal Xu Xiangqian presided over the memorial service and Xu Deheng, Vice Chairman of the Chinese People's Political Consultative Conference, delivered a eulogy.
