= Hu Ruoyu =

Governor of Yunnan (1894–1949)

Hu Ruoyu 胡若愚
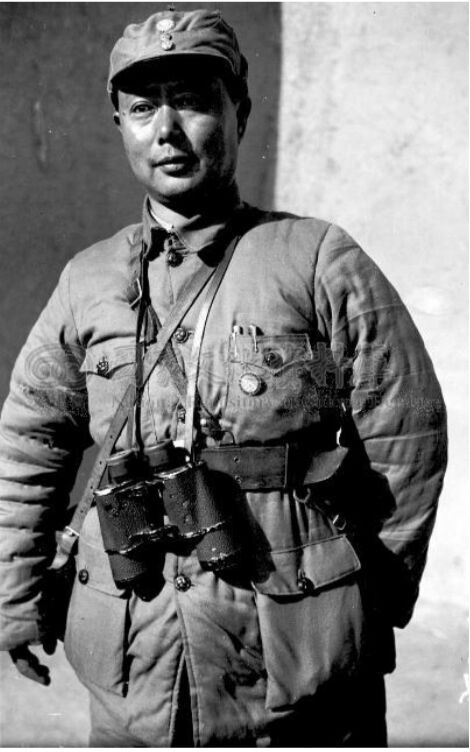
- Born: 1894; Luoping, Yunnan, China
- Died: November 26, 1949 (aged 54–55); Southeastern Guangxi

Lt. Gen. Hu Ruoyu (Chinese: 胡若愚; pinyin: Hú Ruòyú; Wade–Giles: Hu Jo-yü) (1894 – November 26, 1949) was governor of Yunnan in 1927.

Hu was born in Luoping, Yunnan, China. He participated in the uprising against the Qing Dynasty in 1911 as a student at Yunnan Military College and served as a regimental commander after graduation.

During the Warlord Era Hu was a member of the Yunnan clique, one of whose actions was to expel Yunnan Gov. Tang Jiyao from office. Together with Long Yun, Hu was appointed commander of the 39th Army.

He was a member of the chief staff of the Military Committee during World War II.

During the Chinese Civil War Hu fought with the 11th Army Corps against the Chinese Communists, and was killed in southeastern Guangxi in 1949.
