= Third Revolution =

The Third Revolution may refer to many topics.

== Politics ==
- National Protection War, a.k.a. the Third Chinese Revolution
- French Revolution of 1848, a.k.a. the Third French Revolution

== Science and technology ==
- Green Revolution, a.k.a. the Third Agricultural Revolution
- Digital Revolution, a.k.a. the Third Industrial Revolution
