= Liu Xianshi =

Chinese general

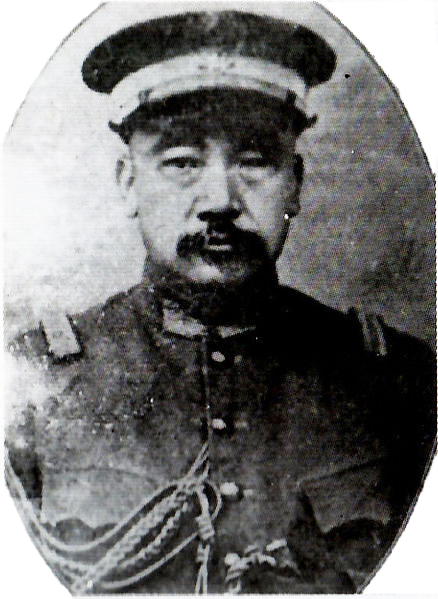
- Born: May 8, 1870; Xingyi, Guizhou, Qing China
- Died: October 14, 1927 (aged 57) Kunming, Yunnan, Republic of China
- Allegiance: Qing dynasty (Republic of China (1912–1949)) Republic of China
- Conflicts: Xinhai Revolution; Second Revolution; National Protection War
- Awards: Order of Rank and Merit; Order of the Precious Brilliant Golden Grain; Order of Wen-Hu

Liu Xianshi (traditional Chinese: 劉顯世; simplified Chinese: 刘显世; Wade–Giles: Liu Hsien-shih; May 8, 1870 – October 14, 1927) was a Chinese general of the Late Qing dynasty and early Republican period. Initially supporting Yuan Shikai and his declaration of the Empire of China, Liu joined Cai E and Tang Jiyao a month after the start of the National Protection War in rebelling against Yuan.

Liu's position in Guizhou was destroyed in 1925 when Yuan Zuming defeated Liu's forces in Xingyi County and took the fortress of Xiawutan, which held two regiment's worth of weapons and a large amount of loot.
