= Great China Yunnan Military Governor's Office =

Military government in 1911

Great China Yunnan Military Governor's Office 大中華國雲南軍都督府 (Chinese)
- 1911–1912
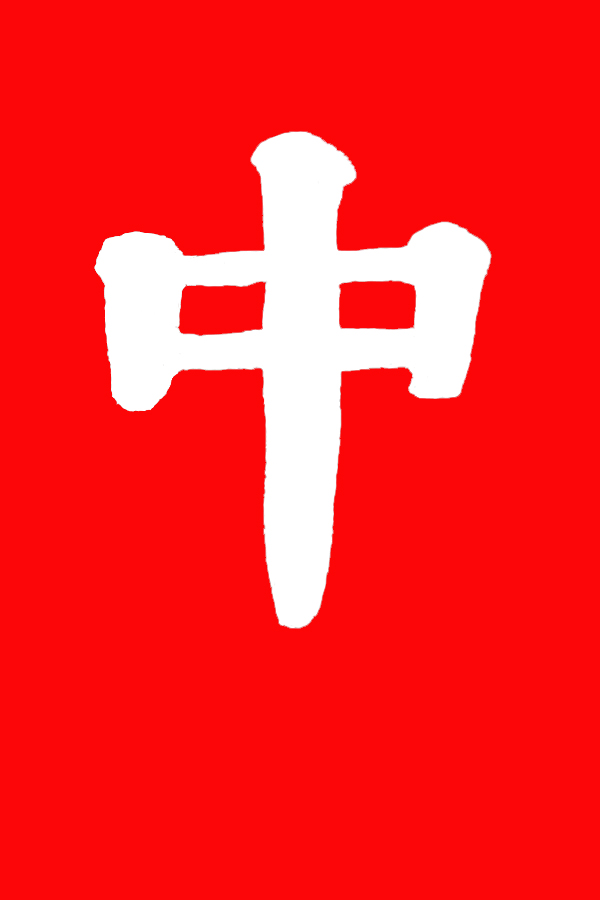
- Flag
- Capital: Kunming
- Government: Military government
- Military Governor
  - 1911–1912: Cai E
- History
  - Xinhai Revolution: October 10, 1911
  - Established: November 1, 1911
  - Abolishment: 1912
Preceded by	Succeeded by
Qing Dynasty	Republic of China

The Great China Yunnan Military Governor's Office was a military government established after the Double-Ninth Uprising during the Xinhai Revolution.

On November 3, 1911, Cai E was elected as military governor of Yunnan. The government consisted of a Senate, a Ministry of Military Affairs led by Li Genyuan, and a General Staff. Following the establishment of the Yunnan Military Governor's Office, the office declared the independence of Yunnan Province. Subsequently, a Western Yunnan military government was established. On November 13, Yunnan established the first Yunnan Provincial Assembly.

In 1912, with accordance to the demands of the Beiyang government, the military and civilian administrations were separated, with a Civil Affairs Chief appointed as the highest administrative office. This would cease the Great China Yunnan Military Governor's Office.
