= Provisional Hunan Assembly =

Warlord-era legislature in Hunan, China

Provisional Hunan Assembly was a legislature in Hunan, China, that was active during the Warlord Era. During the Second Sino-Japanese War, it was led by Zhao Hengti.

After the Wuchang Uprising on October 25, officials in Hunan divided the military and civil administrations between the Ministry of Military Government (軍政部) and the Ministry of Civil Government (民政部). Six departments (司) were created under the civil branch: Civil Government, Finance, Education, Justice, Transportation and Communication, and Foreign Affairs. Despite the power of the military governments, the creation of a single ministry for civil administration gave politicians such as Tan Yankai considerable power.
