= Hunan Provincial Constitution =

Provincial constitution in China

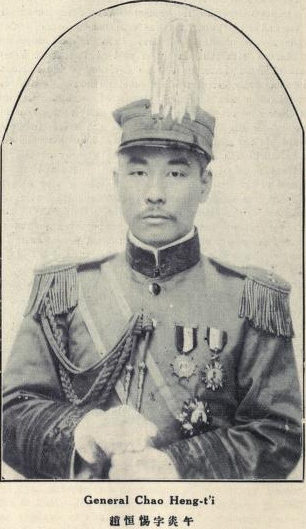
Zhao Hengti, who made himself civilian governor of Hunan with the constitution

The Hunan Provincial Constitution was a provincial constitution of Hunan province as part of the federal movement in China. Originally proposed by civilian governor Tan Yankai, a federalist, Zhao Hengti took it to completion. Thirteen authors drafted the document, including Wang Zhengting, and it was examined by 155 people. Zhao Hengti became the Civilian Governor of Hunan under the constitution. It served as an inspiration for other constitutional movements in China.

== Background ==
During the early Warlord Era, a movement for federalism sprung out, advocated by members of the new civil society in China. The federalists advocated for each autonomous province of China having its own constitution, coming together in a federation. The federalists were notably against the rule of the warlords and supported civilian government. The apogee of this movement came between 1920 and 1923, with Hunan being the province that took the idea the furthest under the rule of Zhao Hengti.

== Federalism in Hunan ==
The civilian politician Tan Yankai ousted the unpopular Zhang Jingyao in July 1920, setting the foundation for the provincial constitution through creating the Provincial Federal Movement. Tan voiced his support for an autonomous Hunan (under the slogan Xiangren zhi Xiang, or "Hunan ruled by Hunanese") and federalism as espoused by federalist Li Jiannong. Tan reduced military spending within the province, opened up elections for governorship, and invited constitutionalist and federalist intellectuals to spread their ideas. These intellectuals notably included Zhang Ji, Cai Yuanpei, John Dewey, and Bertrand Russell. Tao argues that this political support was pragmatic and only aimed at entrenching his own power, while Tang argues that this was partially due to a genuine desire for the autonomy of Hunan from Beijing and the improvement of Hunanese politics.

Zhao Hengti came to power in November 1920, with Tan having passed down his position to him and fleeing the province due to instability in rural areas. Zhao, a Hunan native, was more receptive to Hunan interests and announced that he would work for federalism. Zhao was a military ruler, however, and federalism was anti-warlord, leading Zhao to coopt federalism for himself as a warlord. Mao Zedong criticized this, saying that he "betrayed all the ideas he had supported".

== Publishing of the Constitution ==
Hunan natives such as Li Jiannong chaired the committee that wrote the constitution. Promulgated in 1921, Zhao Hengti claimed the constitution was supported through a democratic referendum.

The Constitution introduced radical political reforms to the province, including the creation of universal suffrage, the position of civilian governor, multiple assemblies and councils including a provincial and local ones, all elected. In 1922, elections went forth, electing the councillors to local councils.

== Reception and Impact ==
The Constitution was viewed positively by different parts of society - communists believed that it would develop class consciousness, liberals believed that it enhanced democracy and public participation in politics, and some believed that the constitution would limit the power of the military. In other provinces of China, the Constitution inspired other constitutionalists to move for provincial constitutionalism, kicking off a conference of eight important groups in Chinese politics in Shanghai aimed at encouraging provincial leaders to create their own constitutions.
