= Yunnan clique =

- 滇系
- Yunnan Provincial Government Seal
- Active: 1915–1945
- Disbanded: 9 October 1945
- Country: Republic of China
- Allegiance: Independent (1915–1916); Constitutional Protection Junta (1917–1921); Government of the Republic of China in Guangzhou (1921–1922); Army and Navy Marshal stronghold of the Republic of China (1923–1924); China Public Interest Party (1924–1927); Nationalist Government (1927–1945)
- Type: Warlord faction
- Size: 20 regiments

Commanders
- Commander-in-Chief (1911–1913): Cai E
- Commander-in-Chief (1913–1921; 1922–1927): Tang Jiyao
- Commander-in-Chief (1921): Gu Pinzhen
- Commander-in-Chief (1927–1945): Long Yun

Aircraft flown
- Bomber: Bréguet 14
- Trainer: Caudron G.3

The Yunnan clique (Chinese: 滇系; pinyin: Diān Xì) was one of several mutually hostile warlord cliques that split from the Beiyang Government in the Republic of China's warlord era. It was named for Yunnan Province. The two most prominent leaders were Cai E and Long Yun, with Cai E declaring independence and Long Yun governing Yunnan during World War 2.

== History ==
=== Kunming Uprising ===
When the 1911 Revolution began, Cai E, the commander of the 37th Brigade of the New Army, revolted against the Qing government and quickly gained control over Yunnan. The local Qing administration was replaced with an independent government and educational reforms were enacted by Cai. He also reorganised the provincial military into a more cohesive independent force. In the following six months, all of Yunnan and southern Sichuan, including the city of Chengdu, were unified under the clique's rule. Cai E was very popular among people because he denounced factionalism and supported a strong central government.

In 1913, Cai E went to serve in Yuan's government in Beijing, leaving behind Tang Jiyao as provincial governor. Jiyao came from a prominent Yunnanese family. That same year the Yunnan provincial police department established the provincial public health office. In December 1915, Yuan Shikai announced his plan to turn China back into a monarchy with himself as emperor. This enraged Cai, who was a supporter of the Republic. Shortly after the announcement, Cai E secretly left Beijing and returned to Yunnan to stage a revolt.

=== Independence ===
On December 25, Cai E, Tang Jiyao, and Li Liejun, on the advice of Liang Qichao, declared Yunnan independent and expressed their opposition to Yuan Shikai's monarchy. Tang would stay as governor, but Cai and Li would assume command of the Nation Protection Army. On January 1, 1916, Yunnan published an official denunciation of Yuan Shikai's monarchy. The same day, three divisions of the National Protection Army marched onto Sichuan, Guizhou, and Guangxi, beginning the National Protection War to restore the republic.

After being informed of Yunnan's declaration of independence, Yuan immediately sent out three armies to crush the rebellion but suffered heavy losses in southern Sichuan by Cai's forces. After several campaigns in the province, it fell under Cai's rule, who became its governor till his death. In the following two months, other provinces declared independence and joined Yunnan in its fight against Yuan. By June, Yuan had been defeated and was replaced by Li Yuanhong as president of the republic.

The National Protection War made Cai a national hero, but he died shortly after from tuberculosis. His chief lieutenant, Tang Jiyao, took over Yunnan and demanded that the National Assembly be restored. When this was accomplished, Yunnan officially reunified with the national government but kept its provincial army separate due to the Beiyang Army's grip on Beijing politics.

=== Guizhou Clique ===
For a lot of its existence, the Guizhou Clique, under Liu Xianshi, had to rely on Yunnan for economic and military assistance. Liu, with help from Tang Jiyao, formed the Guizhou Clique and consolidated military and civilian power, practically bringing forth martial law in the province. Liu, however, did not contribute much to the National Protection War, and still refused to help Yunnan in any way. Due to this, Wang Wenhua began to challenge his rule.

Wang Wenhua supported the warlord Cai E, and was also a staunch critic of Yuan Shikai. This led to a divide in the Guizhou Clique, which also thus led to Wang gaining power in Guizhou. This was not approved by Yunnanese generals or warlords, and as thus caused much friction between the two.

=== Rival government ===
After the second dissolution of the National Assembly, the Manchu Restoration debacle, and the complete domination of the central government by the Beiyang generals, Yunnan joined several other southern provinces in forming a rival government in Guangzhou during the Constitutional Protection Movement. Tang Jiyao was chosen as one of the seven executives of its ruling committee. Within the committee, there was a power struggle between Sun Yatsen's supporters and the Old Guangxi clique. Tang sided with Sun and helped in the expulsion of the Guangxi executives. In 1921, he was ousted by Gu Pinzhen, whose rule was recognized by Sun. The following year, Gu's army defected back to Tang. Tang sided with Sun again during Chen Jiongming's betrayal. Less than a week after Sun died in 1925, Tang claimed to be his rightful successor and made a move on Guangzhou in a bid to overthrow Hu Hanmin and put himself in charge of the Kuomintang. His forces were routed by Li Zongren during the Yunnan-Guangxi War. Thereafter, Tang joined Chen Jiongming's China Public Interest Party as its vice premier. In 1927, Long Yun seized control of the clique; Tang died shortly after.

=== Long Yun's rule ===
Long Yun was at first slightly supportive of Chiang Kai-shek and the government in Nanjing, however this would not last long, and eventually he began to criticize Chiang for his inadequacy at ruling China, and his aggressive warlord subjugation tactics. Long stringently guarded Yunnan's autonomy, and refused to provide much to the war effort in the Second Sino-Japanese War.

Long Yun provided Yunnan with much-needed economic resuscitation, expanding the Tin mines in the south of the country, and subsidising many areas of the economy. This unique style of development made him incredibly popular among the people. Long also gave minorities in Yunnan many rights, for he himself was a Yi, and expanded the education of many ethnic groups in the rural areas.

Yunnan, however, was crucial in the war effort nonetheless. The famous Burma Road led to Kunming, running through Yunnan, and was decisive in getting supplies to the Chinese soldiers fighting off endless Japanese attacks.

After the end of the Second Sino-Japanese War, he was removed from office in the Kunming Incident. Chiang Kai-Shek ordered Long Yun to move the majority of his army (100,000 soldiers) into Indochina without reason, leaving the Yunnan Clique vulnerable to invasion. That night, 5 October 1945 ("the Kunming Incident"), rifles fired in Kunming and the next morning a score of bodies lay at the South Gate. For four days the battle continued as soldiers of Chiang Kai-shek's army assaulted the place. Only a few companies of Long's troops did any shooting; the warlord never had a chance.

== International Relations ==
Due to its proximity to French Indochina, Yunnan's main supplier of arms came from France. Yunnan tried to buy aircraft from the British but was denied because of an arms embargo agreement. Tang also bought German machines, lathes, and planning tools for his arsenal but decided to go no further. In 1920, Tang bought 7,000 rifles and 20 machine guns from French merchants.

Yunnan also claimed a small part of northern Burma called Putao, as did the former Qing Dynasty who controlled the land for some time. The reason for this is that the area had a large historical significance to Yunnan, and was where the first Yunnanese ethnic groups resided. This caused sour relations between the British and Yunnan Clique, and prevented any form of support being done until the Second Sino-Japanese War.

== Airforce ==
In October 1922, Tongkin-based firm, Poinsard et Veyret, sold Tang six Bréguet 14 airplanes and 12 Yunnanese students went to Tongkin to receive flight training.

== See also ==
- Warlord Era
  - List of warlords and military cliques in the Warlord Era

== Works cited ==
- Chan, Anthony (2010). Arming the Chinese: The Western Armaments Trade in Warlord China, 1920-28, Second Edition. University of British Columbia Press. p. 102. ISBN 9780774819923.
- Brazelton, Mary (2019). Mass Vaccination: Citizens' Bodies and State Power in Modern China. Cornell University Press. pp. 41–42. ISBN 9781501739996.
- Zhang, Haipeng; Zhai, Jinyi (2020). A Brief Modern Chinese History. ibidem-Verlag. pp. 149–150. ISBN 9783838214412.
- Ho, Alfred (2002). China's Reforms and Reformers. Praeger. p. 25. ISBN 9780275960803.
