= Wang Jialie =

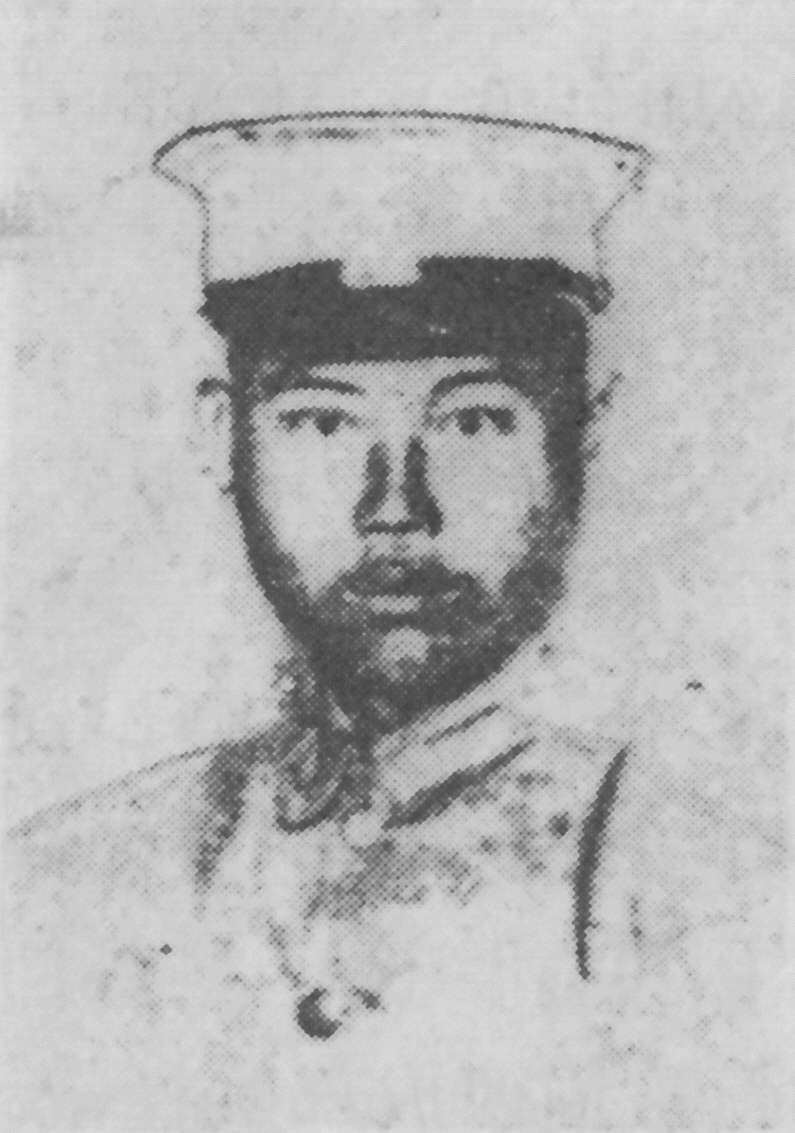
Wang Jialie

Wang Jialie (王家烈) (1893 – August 11, 1966) was Chairmen of the Guizhou government from November 1931 – May 1935. He continuously resisted Chiang Kai-shek's attempt to unify China under his central government.

One of Wang's most notorious and successful attempts occurred during Chiang's first operation to spread his power to Guizhou by establishing Kuomintang party memberships there that were previously non-existent. Wang first refused Chiang's request but later, when he realized he would not get away with it, answered Chiang by claiming that everyone in Guizhou would become a member of Kuomintang. Chiang was too far away to offer any actual help to his recruiters in Guizhou, and as a result they had to randomly circle names from the local population registry in order to fulfill their task, and Wang thus successfully thwarted Chiang's initial takeover attempt.

However, Chiang got his chance for revenge years later when pursuing the fleeing Chinese Red Army during the Long March. Wang's local provincial army was no match for the communist forces and, under the excuse of helping the locals get rid of the communists by chasing after them, Chiang sent his own troops into Guizhou and successfully bribed Wang's trusted lieutenants to defect to Chiang's camp. Without effective military support, Wang was deposed by Chiang after the Chinese Red Army left Guizhou. He eventually returned to Zunyi in May 1946 for his retirement. After the communist revolution, Wang was named the deputy chairman of the provincial People's Political Consultative Conference, but he was denounced during the Cultural Revolution by Red Guards and died in 1966.

== Sources ==
- Rulers: Chinese Administrative divisions, Guizhou
