= Li Yuan (PRC general) =

Chinese general and politician

Li Yuan (Chinese: 黎原; 1917 – December 18, 2008) was a People's Liberation Army major general who served as Chairman of the Hunan Province Revolutionary Committee during the Cultural Revolution.

== History ==
He was born in Xi County, Henan Province in 1917. In August 1937, he graduated from the Nanjing Central Military Academy, and subsequently fought in the Battle of Shanghai.

In 1938 he joined the Eighth Route Army and the Chinese Communist Party, and during the Chinese Civil War, he participated in the Liaoshen Campaign and Pingjin Campaign.

During the Korean War, he was commander of the 140th Division of the People's Volunteer Army.

In 1967, he became Chairman of the Hunan Revolutionary Committee, succeeding former Kuomintang general Cheng Qian.

He died in Beijing in 2008.

Preceded by Cheng Qian as governor of Hunan	Chairman of the Hunan Revolutionary Committee; 1967–1970	Succeeded by Hua Guofeng
