= Tokyo Shinbu Gakko =

Information
- Other name: 東京振武学校
- Opened: 1896
- Closed: 1914

The Tokyo Shinbu Gakkō (東京振武学校) was a military preparatory school located in Tokyo, Japan. Established in 1896 by the Imperial Japanese Army for the purpose of providing basic military training to students from China, many of its students later played important roles in the Xinhai Revolution and in the early period of the Republic of China. The school closed in 1914.

== Background and creation ==
Following the resumption of diplomatic relations in 1896 between the Empire of Japan and Qing dynasty China following the First Sino-Japanese War, the Chinese government began a series of military reforms to create a modern army along western-lines. The Pan-Asian faction within the Japanese government actively assisted in this effort, in hopes of forming an Asian alliance against the Empire of Russia and other European powers, as well as to place Japan in a favorable position to influence the direction of Chinese military reforms and domestic political policy.

To this effect, the Imperial Japanese Army General Staff dispatched General Fukushima Yasumasa and General Utsunomiya Taro to open discussions with Zhang Zhidong, Liu Kunyi and Yuan Shikai about sending Chinese students to Japan for military training. On the diplomatic side, Yano Fumio, the Japanese minister to China, advised the Chinese government that the Japanese government was willing to bear all expenses for the first two hundred students. The first thirty students were sent the same year to the newly established Foreign Student Division of the Seijō Gakkō, a military preparatory school in Tokyo attached to the Imperial Japanese Army Academy.

As the number of students grew year-by-year, in 1903, a separate Shinbu Gakkō was established in Tokyo specifically for Chinese military students, who numbered over 1000 by 1908.

== Influences ==
The creation of the school was initially strongly opposed by Army leader General Yamagata Aritomo, who argued against the wisdom in training a recent, a possibly future enemy, but his objections were overruled by Fukushima. The policy paid dividends to Japan in terms of Chinese assistance and goodwill during the Russo-Japanese War, as well as creating a pro-Japanese officer corps, some of whom would later collaborate with Japan during the Second Sino-Japanese War. The program was initially hailed by Yuan Shikai as essential to the modernization and training of the Chinese military, especially after Japan's victory over Russia in the Russo-Japanese War, and given the much greater economic burden that sending so many students to European schools would have entailed. However but he later expressed concerns that the training stopped at the sub lieutenant rank with little field training, and that access to more advanced training at the Imperial Japanese Army Academy was not forthcoming.

Following the Xinhai Revolution and the establishment of the Republic of China in 1911, the Chinese began to feel more strongly the need to learn directly from the West, rather than from Japan. When an overall decline in Sino-Japanese relations following the Japanese occupation of Shandong Province during World War I led to increasing anti-Japanese sentiments in China, the numbers of Chinese students in Japan began to drop precipitously. The Tokyo Shinbu Gakkō closed in 1914 for lack of students. The site of the school is now the campus of the Tokyo Women's Medical University.

== Notable alumni ==
- Cai E
- Chen Duxiu
- Ouyang Yuqian
- Wang Yitang
- Tang Jiyao
- Cheng Qian
- Zhao Hengti
- Li Liejun
- Sun Chuanfang
- Yan Xishan
- Yin Changheng
- Huang Fu
- Chiang Kai-shek
- Zhang Qun
- Yang Yuting
- Xi Qia
- He Yingqin
- Zang Shiyi
