= Long Yun =

Chinese governor and warlord

- 龍雲
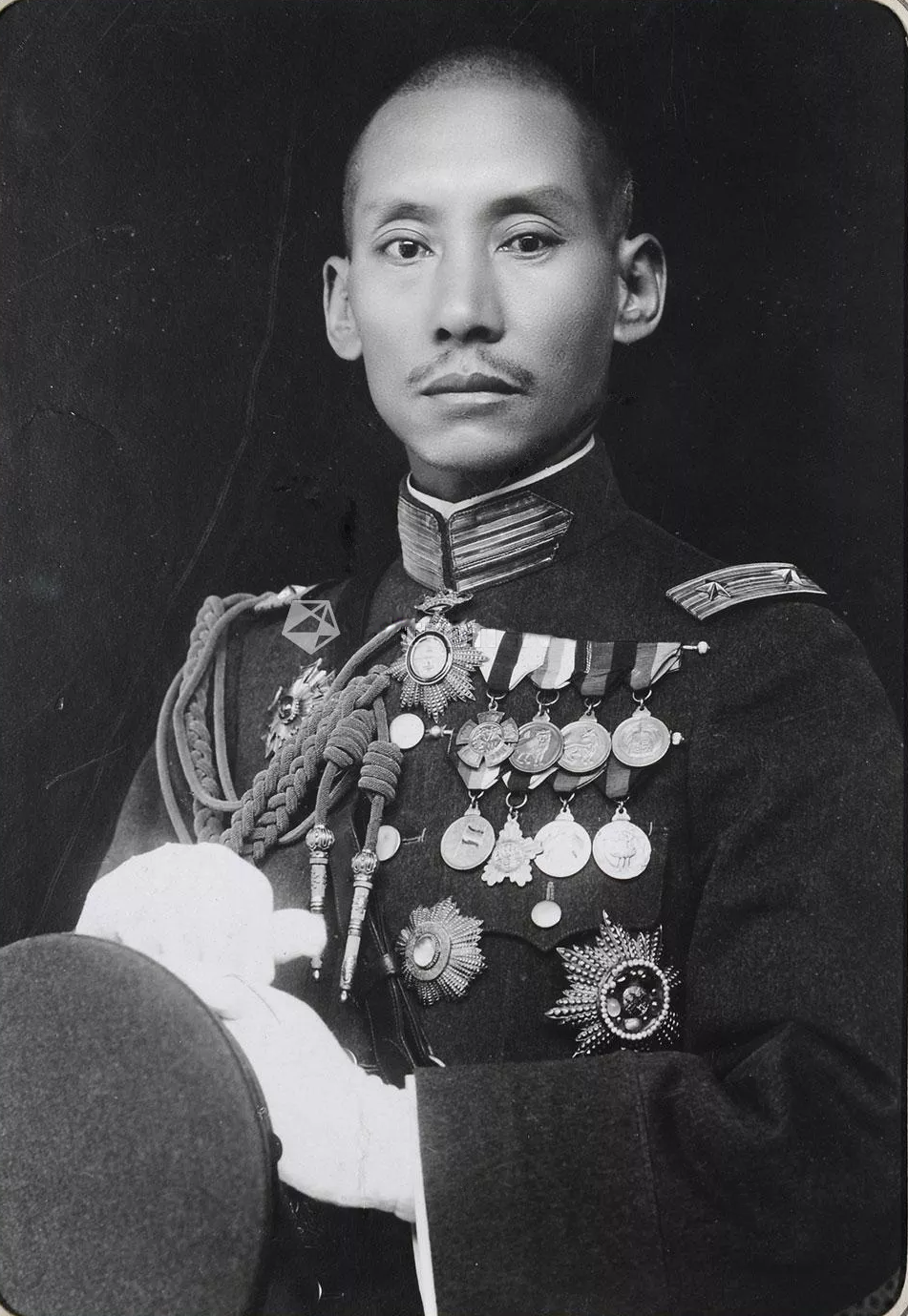

Governor of Yunnan
- In office January 17, 1928 – October 2, 1945
- Preceded by: Tang Jiyao
- Succeeded by: Li Zonghuang (acting); Lu Han

Personal details
- Born: November 27, 1884 Zhaotong, Yunnan, Qing Empire
- Died: June 27, 1962 (aged 77) Beijing, People's Republic of China
- Party: Kuomintang (1919–1948) Revolutionary Committee of the Chinese Kuomintang (1950–1962)
- Education: Yunnan Military Institute
- Nickname: "King of Yunnan"

Military service
- Allegiance: Republic of China
- Branch/service: Yunnan clique (1911–1927); National Revolutionary Army (1927–1947); Republic of China Army (1947–1948)
- Years of service: 1911–1948
- Rank: General
- Commands: 1st Army Group
- Battles/wars: Chinese Civil War; Fujian Incident; Second Sino-Japanese War; South-East Asian theatre of World War II; Burma campaign; Burma campaign; Battle of Northern Burma and Western Yunnan

Long Yun (simplified Chinese: 龙云; traditional Chinese: 龍雲; pinyin: Lóng Yún; Wade–Giles: Lung Yun; 27 November 1884 – 27 June 1962) was governor and warlord of the Chinese province of Yunnan from 1927 to October 1945, when he was overthrown in a coup (known as "The Kunming Incident") by Du Yuming under the order of Chiang Kai-shek.

== Early life ==
Long Yun was an ethnic Yi, and a grandson of a tribal headman (tusi). His Yi name was Naji Niaoti (纳吉鸟梯) or Naji Jiajia (纳吉岬岬), while Long Yun was a Han Chinese name he adopted later. He was a cousin of Lu Han.

Long Yun participated in the anti-Qing struggle in its early years. First he joined the local warlord's army in 1911 and was gradually promoted to the rank of corps commander. He served in Tang Jiyao's Yunnan Army for years until February 1927, when he, together with Hu Ruoyu, launched a coup and expelled Tang from office. Soon after that he became 38th Army commander in the National Revolutionary Army, at the same time continuing as Yunnan chairman for more than a decade.

== Governor of Yunnan ==
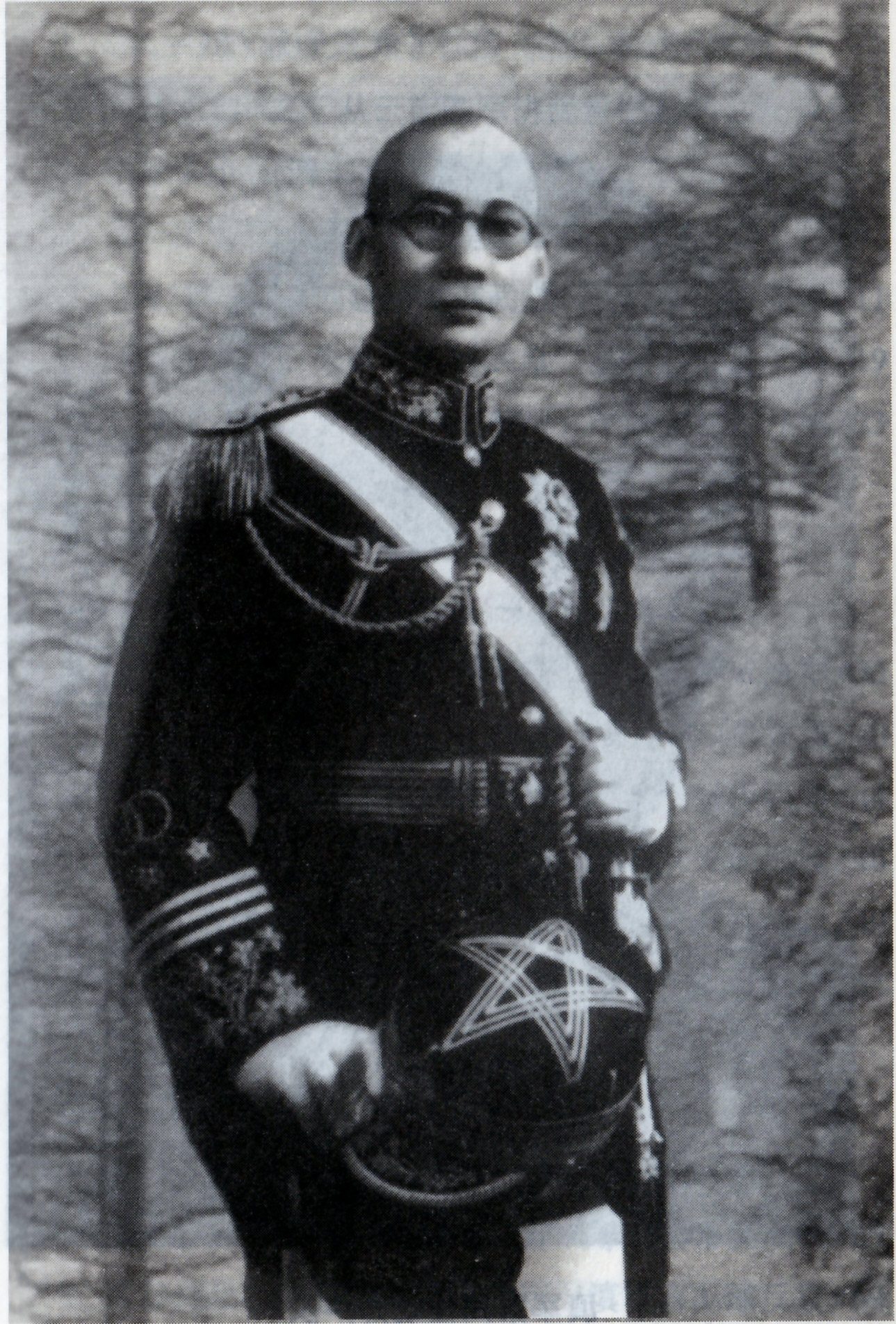
Long Yun

After the remarkable "26" coup, Tang Jiyao, then governor of Yunnan, was overthrown by Long Yun and his allies. Long Yun succeeded as the new governor and served as governor of Yunnan from 1928–45. When he was in power he put forward the goal of building a new Yunnan. He carried out a series of reorganizations and reforms from political, military, economic, cultural and educational aspects. During this period Yunnan was politically clear, had good social stability and a strong atmosphere of democracy. He consolidated and reorganized the economy, expanded paper money in the region and reorganized the tariff tax regulations. He prioritized textile export while reorganizing and developing production of tin ore, tungsten, antimony, copper, salt, coal and other resources. Another big part of his project was the improvement of infrastructure, which was very poor in Yunnan. To improve it, he established a transportation enterprise that built the Yunnan–Burma Highway, the Diankang Road, the Sichuan–Yunnan West Road, the Yunnan–Sichuan Road, the Yunnan–Guangxi Highway and the Diankang Highway. He also paid much attention to the agricultural parts of Yunnan. He implemented measuring of land and later used the information they achieved to put through a reformed tax collection. He worked to expand grain farming, reduce tax revenue and strived to achieve food self-sufficiency for all farmers. Due to Long Yun's reforms, Kunming (capital of Yunnan) was commonly known as a "democratic fortress".

== Second Sino-Japanese War ==
He was nominated as commander-in-chief of the 1st Army Group, fighting against the Japanese in his province. The Second Sino-Japanese War (1937–45) brought progress and modernization to Yunnan, as the Nationalist government developed the province into a war base against the Japanese. Factories, universities and government agencies were transplanted there from the coastal regions, and fresh manpower, capital and ideas poured into the province. Industries were established and efforts made by the government to develop the resources of the region. The Burma Road made Yunnan the corridor through which supplies flowed to Allied bases in all parts of China, and Kunming became a key U.S. Air Force base. A major advance by the Japanese Army along the upper Salween River in 1942 was halted at Huitongqiao, near Tengchong, indicating the vital role that Yunnan played in the country’s defense.

The campaign involved Chinese troops, assisted by American forces, crossing the upper Salween on 11 May 1944 in order to drive Japanese forces from Yunnan into northern Burma. On 11 May about 40,000 Chinese of the Chinese Expeditionary Force crossed the Salween initially and a further 60,000 arrived later. About 17,000–19,000 Chinese and 15,000 Japanese were killed in the resulting battle. There were more Chinese casualties because the Japanese had time to prepare their fortifications on the south side of the river.

Long was among the Nationalist government insiders implicated in corruption during the 1942-1943 American Dollar Bond scandal. After the 1941 Japanese declaration of war against the United States and the United Kingdom, the two allies sought to support China in a concrete way despite logistical limitations following the loss of British Burma. The two countries loaned significant amounts of money to the Nationalist government. The Nationalist government decided to use USD$200 million to absorb excess fabi in an effort to curb inflation. In theory, Chinese purchasers would use fabi to buy bonds at the official exchange rate and be paid in dollars when the bonds were redeemed following victory over Japan. The American Dollar Bonds were issued on March 24, 1942. The public response was poor, with few bond sales. In October 1943, H.H. Kung sent a secret memorandum to Chiang Kai-shek asking that the bond sales end. Subscriptions were closed on October 15, 1943 and a central bank official falsely announced that all bonds had been sold. Secretly, insiders then purchased the remaining bonds using currency acquired on the black market. The result was a windfall for Nationalist government insiders including Long, Kung, members of the Soong family, Wei Tao-ming, and others.

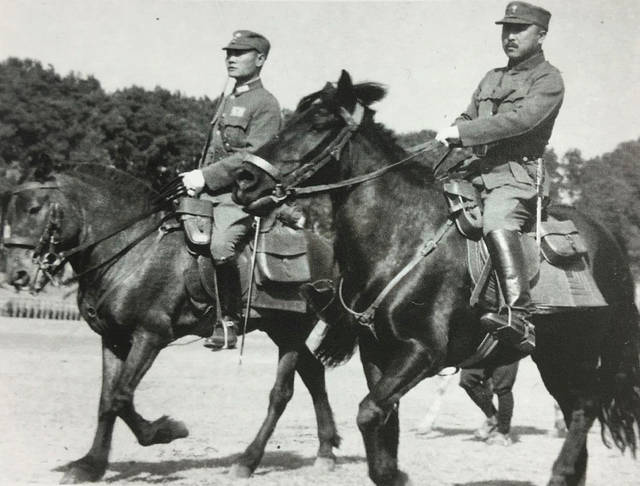
General Wei Lihuang (right) and General Long Yun (left) inspecting troops of the Chinese Expeditionary Force, March 1944

== Post-war ==
Immediately following the war, Generalissimo Chiang Kai-shek moved against Long Yun. When Chiang had retreated into western China, he was forced into an area barely under his control and hardly touched by the national revolution that had taken place after the fall of the Qing. Both of the two principal provinces of west China, Szechwan (pop.: 60 million) and Yunnan (pop.: 11 million), were dominated by old-style warlords. In 1941, Chiang had ousted the warlord of Szechwan. When Long Yun's turn came in 1945, he was caught by surprise: patriotically obeying Chiang's diversionary orders, a good part of his private army of over 100,000 men had marched far away, into Indochina.

Long Yun had been offered a face-saving job in Chongqing earlier, but he had refused. The absence of his army, however, led to the final extraction. That night, 5 October 1945 ("the Kunming Incident"), rifles fired in Kunming and the next morning a score of bodies lay at the South Gate. For four days the battle continued as soldiers of Chiang Kai-shek's army assaulted the place. Only a few companies of Long's troops did any shooting; the warlord never had a chance.

On the fourth day, Premier T.V. Soong flew down from Chongqing. He and the Chinese commander in chief, Gen. He Yingqin, had a morning conference with Gen. Long and that afternoon escorted him by air to Chongqing. Gen. Lu Han, Long's former aide, took over the Yunnan government for the Generalissimo.

After being removed from his reign of 18 years, and his meaningless appointment to a position in Chongqing, Long Yun escaped to Hong Kong at the end of 1948 and joined the Kuomintang Revolutionary Committee (KMT-RC), a KMT anti-Chiang organization. In August 1949, he declared his revolt against Chiang together with Huang Shaohong in Hong Kong. The KMT-RC ultimately became the largest "democratic party" under Communist Party rule after the founding of the People's Republic.

== Return to Beijing ==
After the establishment of the Central People's Government of the People's Republic of China on October 1, 1949, Long was appointed as a Member of the Central People's Government.

On June 28, 1950, he became a Vice Chairman of the Southwest Military and Political Committee. In early 1953, his position was re-designated as Vice Chairman of the Southwest Administrative Committee.

In September 1954, Long was appointed as a Vice Chairman of the National Defense Commission, which was chaired by Mao Zedong. He served alongside senior Communist Party leaders such as Zhu De, Lin Biao, He Long, Peng Dehuai, Chen Yi, Deng Xiaoping, and Ye Jianying. In 1956, he visited Eastern European countries such as the Soviet Union, Romania, Czechoslovakia, Yugoslavia and others. However, he was removed from this position in 1958.

In 1959, he was once again elected as a member of the Standing Committee of the Chinese People's Political Consultative Conference.

On June 27, 1962, Long died in Beijing due to acute myocardial infarction.

Long was buried in Babaoshan Revolutionary Cemetery in grave number 81.

== Anti-Rightist movement ==
Later, during the Anti-Rightist Movement, Long Yun was labeled a rightist because of his criticism of Chinese foreign aid policy. He maintained that if the living standard in the Soviet Union was so high that many ordinary workers could own their own car, the responsibility for foreign aid should fall on the Soviet Union, not China, since the Chinese economy was much less advanced than that of the Soviet Union since China was still recovering from wars.

Long Yun refused to change his view and openly complained of his treatment for telling the truth. Ultimately, on the day following his death in 1962, the Chinese government formally declared that he was not a rightist and was thus partially "rehabilitated." In July 1980, nearly two decades after his death, he was finally fully "rehabilitated" in accordance with the Chinese government's policy of admitting the Anti-Rightist Movement had been wrong.
