= Tang Jiyao =

Chinese warlord (1883–1927)

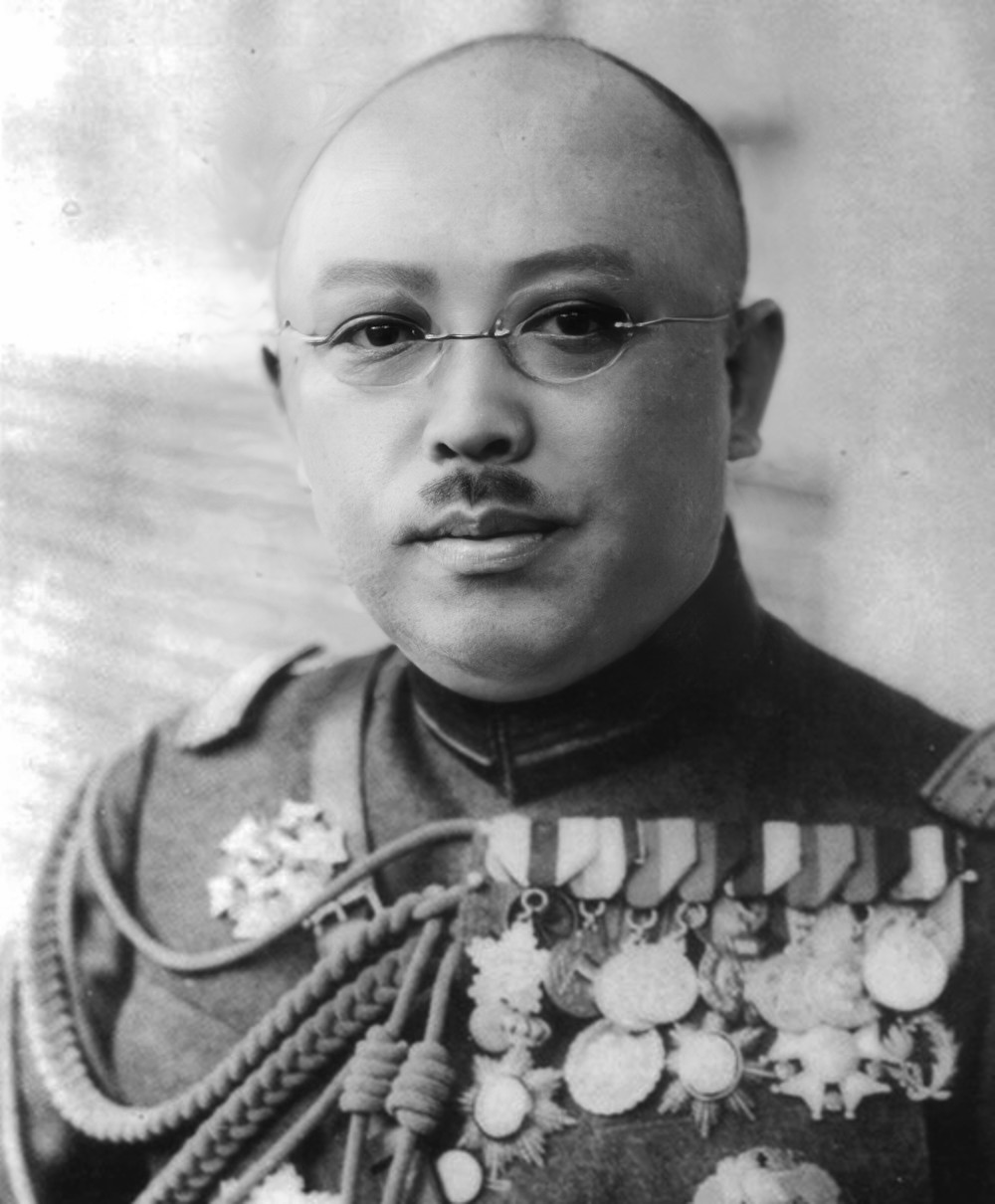
- Gen. Tang Jiyao

Military Governor of Guizhou
- In office 1912–1913
- Succeeded by: Liu Xianshi

Military Governor of Yunnan
- In office 1913–1927
- Preceded by: Cai E
- Succeeded by: Long Yun

Personal details
- Born: 14 August 1883 Qujing, Yunnan, China
- Died: 23 May 1927 (aged 43) Kunming, Yunnan, China
- Party: Kuomintang
- Other political affiliations: Progressive Party; China Zhi Gong Party
- Education: Imperial Japanese Army Academy

Military service
- Allegiance: Qing dynasty (Republic of China (1912–1949)) Republic of China
- Years of service: 1911-1927
- Rank: Marshal
- Battles/wars: National Protection War, Northern Expedition

Tang Jiyao (simplified Chinese: 唐继尧; traditional Chinese: 唐繼堯; pinyin: Táng Jìyáo; Wade–Giles: T'ang Chi-yao) (August 14, 1883 – May 23, 1927) was a Chinese general and warlord of Yunnan during the Warlord Era of early Republican China. He was military governor of Yunnan from 1913–1927.

== Life ==
Tang was born in Huize county in 1883 in what is Qujing, Yunnan province. He passed the Imperial examination in 1903 and was selected by the Qing government to study military theory at Tokyo Shimbu Gakko in Japan the following year. While in Japan he met Sun Yat-sen and became a member of the Tongmenghui revolutionary society dedicated to overthrowing the monarchy. In 1907 he continued on to the Imperial Japanese Army Academy. Returning to Yunnan in 1909, he served in a number of military posts in the New Army. In 1911, under the command of Gen. Cai E, he participated in the Wuchang Uprising, which marked the start of the Xinhai Revolution that eventually toppled the Qing dynasty.

During early 1912 Tang's forces invaded neighboring Guizhou Province, which he conquered. He was recognized as military governor of Guizhou by the Beiyang government in May of that year. Liu Xianshi succeeded Tang as Guizhou governor when Tang returned to Yunnan to succeed Cai E as military governor. Tang Jiyao replaced Cai E as military Governor of Yunnan in 1913. Tang agreed with Cai E that the military was the most important institution in China and should play a major role in government, leading to the Yunnan army remaining a major force.

When Yuan Shikai proclaimed himself emperor of China in December 1915, Tang announced the independence of Yunnan with the support of Cai E, Li Liejun and others. He was a prominent leader of the army against Yuan Shikai during the National Protection War, and with Yuan's death Tang emerged as one of the most powerful military leaders in southern China and extended his power base into Guangxi and Sichuan provinces.

After Cai E died in 1916, Tang helped Sun Yat-sen set up the Constitutional Protection Movement in 1917 and started his own party, the People's Party (民治党), while remaining a member of Sun's Kuomintang.

Tang Jiyao had a cousin, Tang Jiyu, who was also a general. Tang Jiyao sought to use propaganda to gain publicity for himself on the national stage in China. He smuggled confiscated opium to Shanghai, but the local Green Gang informed the British authorities and much of the opium ended up on the black market. Tang Jiyu avoided Shanghai during the trial against officials involved in the opium deal in 1916.

Tang Jiyao set up an opium trafficking scheme in Yunnan, with monopolies, taxes and licenses, and succeeded in producing large amounts of opium from poppy plants, which were suited to Yunnan's climate. He transported opium via Indochina to Haiphong, which was a port, from where it was sent to China via the coast. Along with the prospects of exporting homegrown Yunnanese opium and morphia to other provinces, Tang Jiyao maintained his fleet of dozens of combat and transport aircraft based at Kunming Wujiaba airbase which he and Cai E established in 1911, and officially opening Yunnan Aviation School in 1922.

Tang Jiyao was described in colorful ways in two books by French journalist and novelist Lucien Bodard, i.e. "Monsieur le consul" ("The French Consul", 1973) and "Le fils du consul" ("The Consul's Son", 1975), based on his recollections when he was a child with his father, Albert Bodard, who was Consul of France, successively in Chengdu and in Yunnanfu (later called Kunming). In these two books there are chapters with extensive descriptions of Tang Jiyao's dealings with colonial French authorities in China and Hanoi, French Indochina, as part of his efforts to develop his drug trade to finance weapons purchases for his army while France was trying to build a railroad from Hanoi to Kunming and further to Chengdu to expand their economic and political interests in southern China from French Indochina.

When Sun Yat-sen was appointed grand marshal of the military government in Guangzhou, Tang Jiyao was promoted to the rank of Marshal. He assisted Sun in defeating the Old Guangxi Clique, when it tried to seize the Yunnan Army and remove Tang as its leader in 1920.

== Downfall ==
Six days after Sun's death in 1925, Tang claimed to be Sun's successor and head of the Kuomintang; however, the party rejected his claims. Tang then invaded Guangdong and Guangxi but was defeated by Li Zongren in the Yunnan-Guangxi War. Tang later became vice premier of Chen Jiongming's China Public Interest Party. He died of illness in May 1927 in Kunming, one month after he was ousted by Hu Ruoyu and Long Yun in a military coup and lost all of his power in Yunnan. Long Yun then supported Chiang Kai-shek's Nanjing government, dissolved the People's Party and expelled Chen's party.
