= Cai E =

Chinese revolutionary leader (1882–1916)

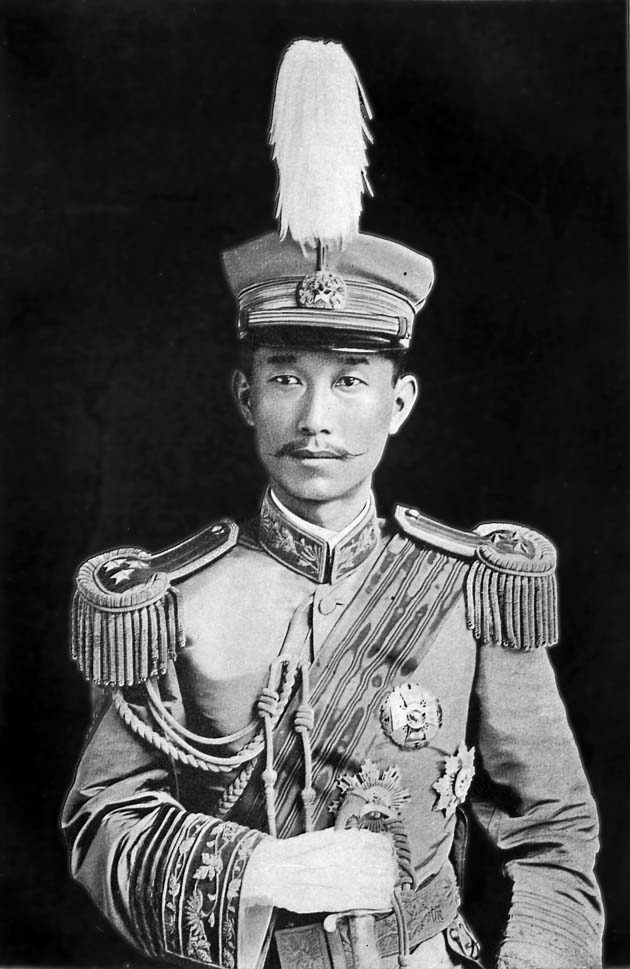
- Cai in 1916

Governor of Yunnan
- In office 1911 – 1913, 1916
- Succeeded by: Tang Jiyao

Personal details
- Born: 19 December 1882 Shaoyang, Hunan, Qing Empire
- Died: 8 November 1916 (aged 33) Fukuoka, Empire of Japan
- Resting place: Yuelu Mountain, Xiang River, Changsha, Hunan, China
- Party: Tongmenghui; Progressive Party
- Education: Shiwu College (now Hunan University); Tokyo Shimbu Gakko; Imperial Japanese Army Academy
- Awards: Order of Rank and Merit; Order of the Precious Brilliant Golden Grain; Order of Wen-Hu

Military service
- Allegiance: Qing Dynasty; Great China Yunnan Military Governor's Office (Republic of China (1912–1949)) Republic of China
- Rank: General
- Battles/wars: Xinhai Revolution; National Protection War

Cai E (simplified Chinese: 蔡锷; traditional Chinese: 蔡鍔; pinyin: Cài È; Wade–Giles: Ts'ai^{⁴} O^{⁴}; 18 December 1882 – 8 November 1916), also romanised as Tsai Ao, born Cai Genyin (Chinese: 蔡艮寅; pinyin: Cài Gěnyín), courtesy name Songpo (Chinese: 松坡; pinyin: Sōngpō), was a Chinese revolutionary leader and general. He led the National Protection War against Yuan Shikai's attempt to restore the monarchy.

== Biography ==
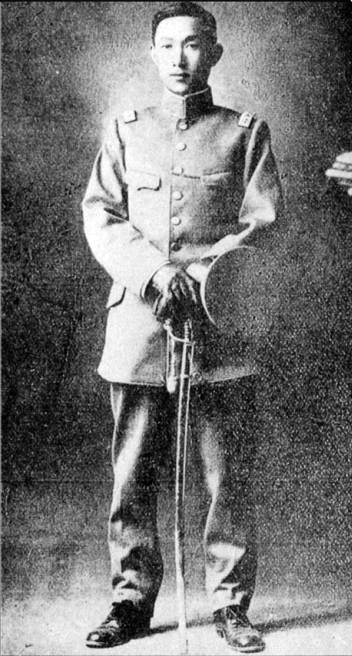
Cai E

=== Early career ===
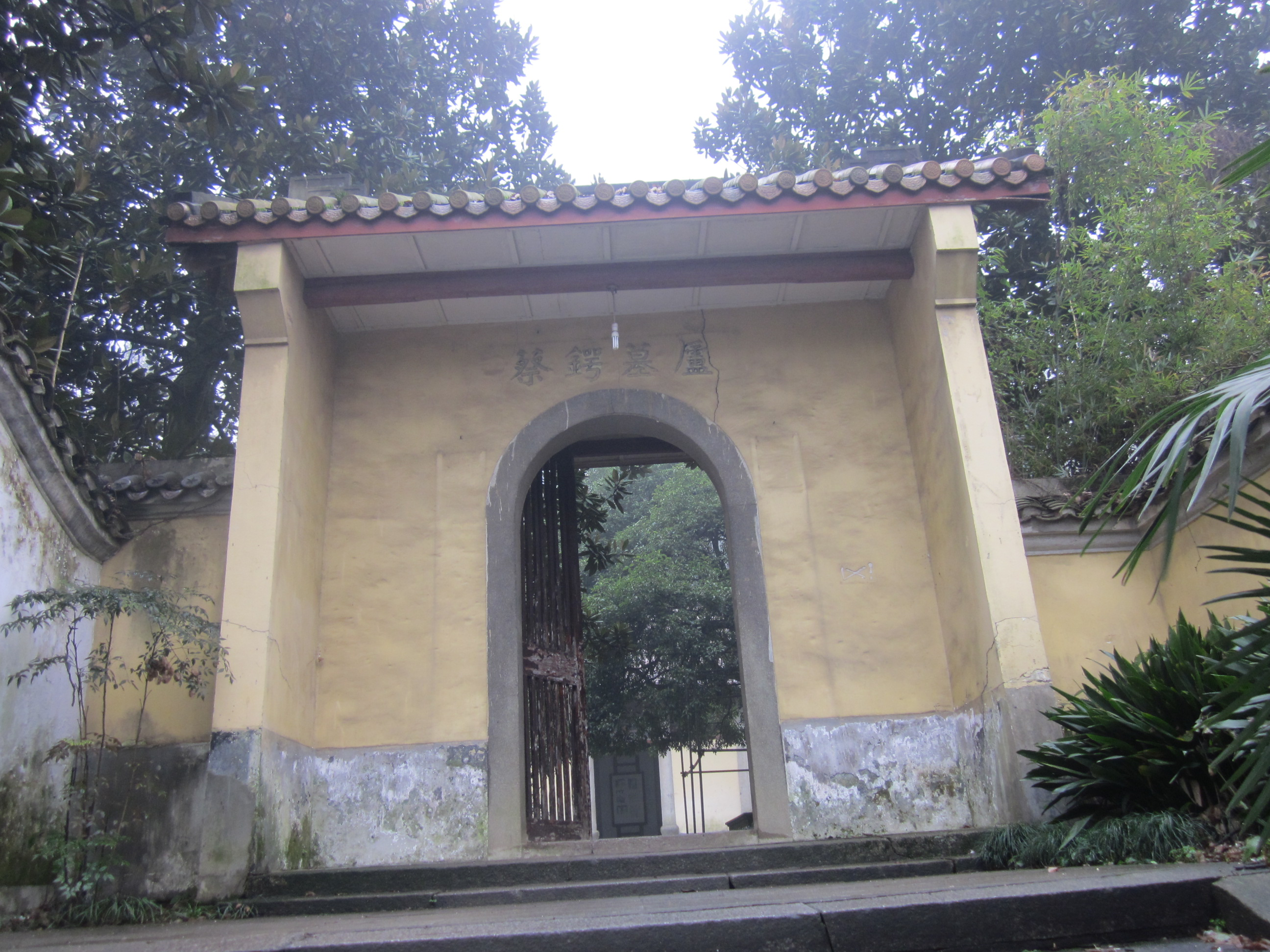
The Memorial Cottage of Cai E, located in Yuelu Mountain, Changsha, Hunan, China.

Cai studied at the prestigious and progressive Shiwu Xuetang (School of Current Affairs), where he was taught by reformer faction intellectual Liang Qichao and Tang Caichang. He went to Japan in 1899. Cai returned to China in 1900, when he was only 18, and attempted to take part in an uprising against the Qing Dynasty as part of the Self-Support Army, a revolutionary militia led by Tang Caichang. When the rebellion failed, Cai returned to Japan. During this second sojourn in Japan he received military training at the Tokyo Shimbu Gakko, followed by the Imperial Japanese Army Academy.

He returned to Guangxi Province, where he held several military posts and established a military training academy from 1904 to 1910. While in Guangxi he joined the Tongmenghui, a Chinese revolutionary organization dedicated to the overthrow of the Qing dynasty. In 1910 he was transferred to Yunnan Province to command the 37th Brigade of the New Army and teach at the Yunnan Military Academy in Kunming. One of his pupils at the school was Zhu De, who began studying there in 1909 and graduated in 1912.

Shortly after the Xinhai Revolution began on 10 October 1911, Cai, leading the 37th Brigade, successfully occupied Yunnan. After the revolution he served as Commander-in-Chief of the Military Government of Yunnan.

Cai E was Governor of Yunnan from 1911 to 1913. After the revolution Cai gained a reputation as a strong supporter of democracy and of Kuomintang politician Song Jiaoren. Following Song's assassination by Yuan Shikai, and Yuan's subsequent assumption of the presidency of the Republic of China, Yuan had Cai removed from office and eventually held under house arrest in Beijing. Tang Jiyao replaced Cai E as Military Governor of Yunnan in 1913.

=== Opposition to Yuan Shikai ===
In 1915, Yuan Shikai announced his plans to dissolve the Republic and proclaim himself the emperor of a new dynasty. After hearing of his intentions, Cai escaped assassination on 11 November, first returning to Japan and then to Yunnan. After returning to Yunnan, Cai established the local National Protection Army to fight Yuan Shikai and defend the Republic.

On 12 December, Yuan formally "accepted" a petition to become emperor, and protests spread throughout China. On 23 December Cai sent a telegram to Beijing threatening to declare independence if Yuan did not cancel his plans within two days. When Yuan did not respond favorably, Cai declared independence on 25 December and made plans to invade Sichuan. The governor of Guizhou joined Cai in rebellion, declaring independence on 27 December. Yuan had himself inaugurated as emperor on 1 January 1916, and Cai successfully occupied Sichuan later that month.

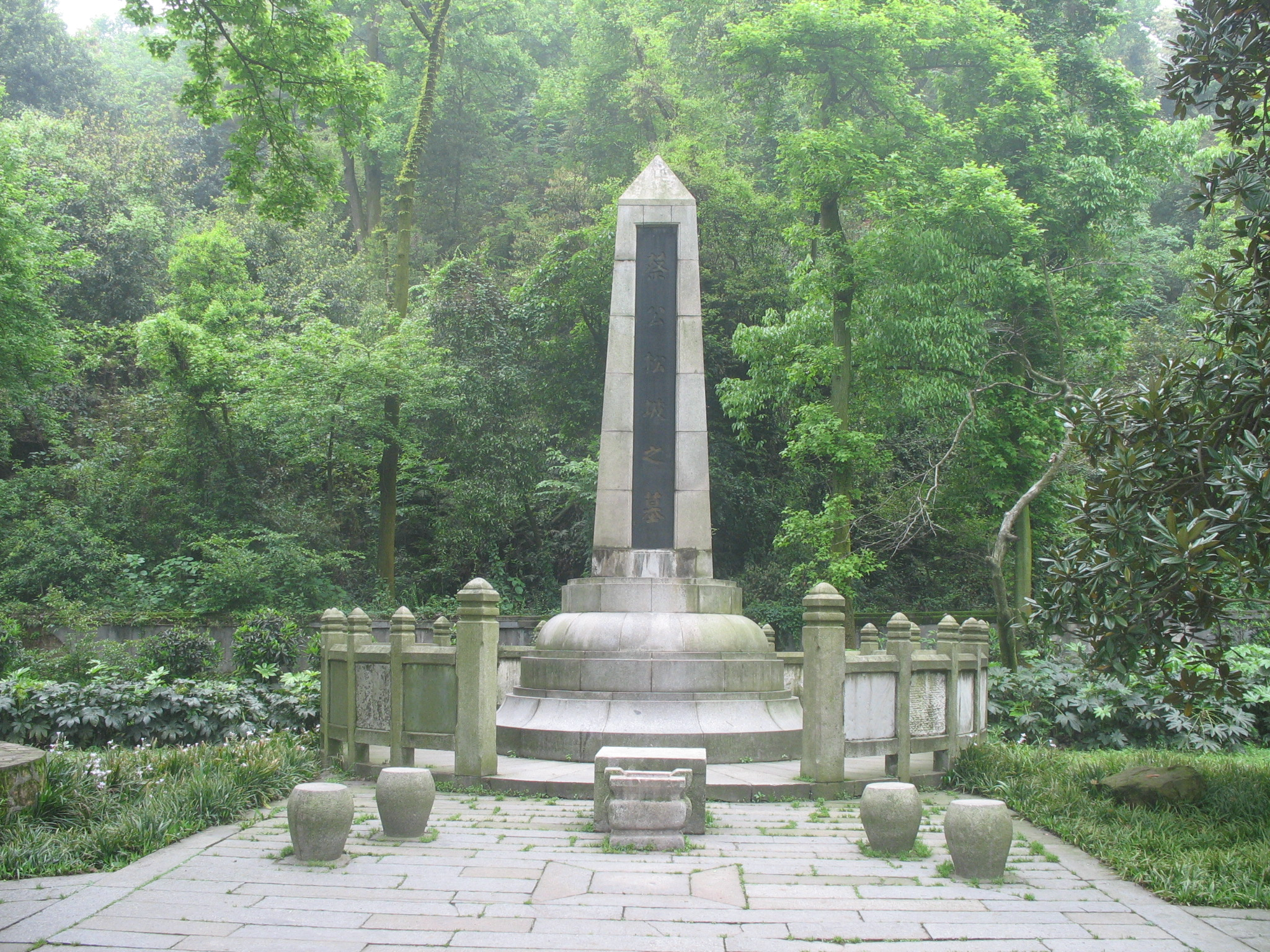
The Tomb of Cai E, located in Yuelu Mountain, Changsha, Hunan, China.

Yuan sent two leading military commanders from northern China to attack Cai, but although the forces sent by Yuan outnumbered Cai's army, Yuan's commanders were either unwilling or unable to defeat him. When it became clear that Cai's rebellion would be successful, many other provinces joined him in resisting Yuan. Guangxi and Shandong declared independence in March, Guangdong and Zhejiang in April and Shaanxi, Sichuan and Hunan in May. With several provinces behind them, the revolutionaries successfully forced Yuan to abandon monarchism on 22 March 1916.

After Yuan died on 6 June 1916, Cai held the positions of Governor-General and Governor of Sichuan. He left for Japan for medical treatment at Kyushu Imperial University in Fukuoka for tuberculosis later in 1916, but died shortly after his arrival. He was accorded a state funeral in China at Yuelu Mountain in Hunan on 12 April 1917.

== Legacy ==
Many of the warlords who served under Yuan Shikai did not support his ambition to revive the monarchy, and Cai E was one of the leading figures who successfully forced Yuan to step down. He served as an inspiration for Zhu De, who later became one of the most successful military leaders of the Chinese Red Army, the forerunner to the People's Liberation Army.

== Culture ==
Beyond his military career, Cai's relationship with the courtesan Xiao Fengxian (lit. 'Little Balsam'), alias of Zhu Xiaofeng, has been widely romanticized. During his time in Beijing from 1914 to 1915, while under close surveillance by Yuan Shikai, Cai cultivated a reputation for frequenting pleasure quarters and keeping the company of Xiao Fengxian in order to feign political indifference and allay Yuan's suspicions. He later managed to leave Beijing and raise an army in Yunnan against Yuan. In popular folklore, Xiao Fengxian is credited with providing crucial cover for Cai's escape from Yuan.

== Bibliography ==
- Beck, Sanderson. "Republican China in Turmoil 1912-1926". EAST ASIA 1800-1949. 2007. Retrieved 14 October 2011.
- 陈贤庆(Chen Xianqing), 民国军阀派系谈 (The Republic of China warlord cliques discussed), 2007 revised edition
- Schemmel, B. "Cai E". Rulers.org. 2011. Retrieved 14 October 2011.
- "Cai E". Archived from the original on 26 May 2007. . Yuelu Academy. 28 September 2011. Retrieved 17 October 2011.
