= National Protection War =

Anti-monarchist civil war in China (1915–16)

- Part of the aftermath of the Second Revolution
Date	25 December 1915 – 14 July 1916 (202 days)
Location	Southwestern, Southern, and Eastern China
Result	National Protection Army victory: Yuan Shikai renounces the throne; fall of the Empire of China; Restoration of the Republic of China

Belligerents
(Republic of China (1912–1949)) National Protection Army; Yunnan clique; Guizhou clique; Old Guangxi clique; (Kuomintang) Chinese Revolutionary Party; Supported by: Progressive Party	Beiyang government; Empire of China (before 22 March); (Republic of China (1912–1949)) Republic of China (after 22 March); Supported by: Peace Planning Society

Commanders and leaders
National Protection Army: (Republic of China (1912–1949)) Cai E; (Republic of China (1912–1949)) Tang Jiyao; (Republic of China (1912–1949)) Lu Rongting; (Republic of China (1912–1949)) Liang Qichao; (Republic of China (1912–1949)) Feng Guozhang; (Republic of China (1912–1949)) Tang Rui †; Chinese Revolutionary Party: Sun Yat-sen; Li Liejun; Chen Qimei X; Chiang Kai-shek; Ju Zheng	Beiyang Army: Yuan Shikai; Zhang Jingyao; Ma Jizeng; Cao Kun; Feng Yuxiang; Long Jinguang; Peace Planning Society: Yang Du; Yan Fu; Sun Yuyun; Liu Shipei; Li Xiehe; Hu Ying

Strength
200,000+	700,000+

The National Protection War (simplified Chinese: 护国战争; traditional Chinese: 護國戰爭; pinyin: Hù guó zhànzhēng), also known as the Anti-Monarchy War, or the Third Revolution, was a civil war that took place in China from December 1915 to July 1916. Following the overthrow of the Qing dynasty three years previously, the Republic of China was established in its place. The war was caused by President Yuan Shikai's proclamation of the Empire of China, with himself as the Hongxian Emperor.

In Yunnan, military leaders, including Tang Jiyao, Cai E and Li Liejun, declared their independence and launched military expeditions against Yuan Shikai. Yuan's Beiyang Army experienced several defeats and fractured, which led other provinces in the south to declare independence as well. Eventually, under immense pressure from the entire nation, Yuan Shikai was forced to abdicate. He resumed his rule as president and died a few months later.

== Origin ==
After Yuan Shikai plotted the assassinations of Song Jiaoren and Chen Qimei, founders of the Kuomintang, Sun Yat-sen launched the Second Revolution against him. It was unsuccessful, and Sun Yat-sen was forced to flee to Japan while the Kuomintang was dissolved. Between August and December 1915 supporters of Yuan began to clamor for the restoration of a Chinese monarchy. Yuan declared himself emperor of the new Chinese empire under the name Hongxian Emperor. The new empire was due to formally launch on 1 January 1916, when he intended to conduct the accession rites.

== Process ==
Shortly after Yuan Shikai proclaimed himself the Hongxian Emperor, Cai E and Tang Jiyao rulers of Yunnan declared independence in the provincial capital, Kunming. The date was 25 December 1915. They organized the National Protection Army under the command of Li Liejun and Cai E, and began a military expedition against Yuan Shikai and his supporters to defeat the new Imperial China, and save the Republic of China. Yuan Shikai sent 80,000 men in an attempt to attack Yunnan, but his troops suffered a major defeat in Sichuan province. Before this defeat, Guizhou and Guangxi provinces declared their independence between January and March 1916. Guangdong, Shandong, Hunan, Shanxi, Jiangxi and Jiangsu followed suit and declared their independence shortly thereafter. Discord began to surface even inside the emperor's government in the national capital of Beijing. Faced with mounting pressure, Yuan Shikai was forced to abdicate on 22 March 1916, restoring the Republic, but he returned to his office of president until his death on 6 June 1916. The provinces backing the National Protection Army refused to accept Yuan as president and formed a rival military government in May, based in Zhaoqing, Guangdong, and elected Tang Jiyao as their leader. It was not until 14 July 1916 that the National Protection War ended, with the provinces rescinding their declarations of independence. However, the independent provinces were controlled by warlords, and so the Warlord Era began.

== Northwest China ==
The governor of Xinjiang, Yang Zengxin, was a former Qing dynasty official who approved of the Yuan Shikai's monarchism and was against republicanism. Yang commanded thousands of Chinese Muslim troops. He ruled Xinjiang with a clique of Yunnanese, being from Yunnan himself. His subordinate Muslim generals Ma Fuxing and Ma Shaowu were also Yunnanese. When some of the Yunnanese revolutionaries wanted to join Cai E in rebelling against Yuan Shikai, he beheaded them at a New Year's banquet in 1916.

== Taiwan ==
Han Chinese and Aboriginal rebels launched the Tapani incident uprising against Japanese rule in 1915 with the rebel leader Yu Qingfang telling people that Yuan Shikai's Beiyang army would come and help liberate Taiwan from the Japanese. The rebellion was ruthlessly crushed by Japanese authorities within weeks of the initial uprising.

== Influence ==
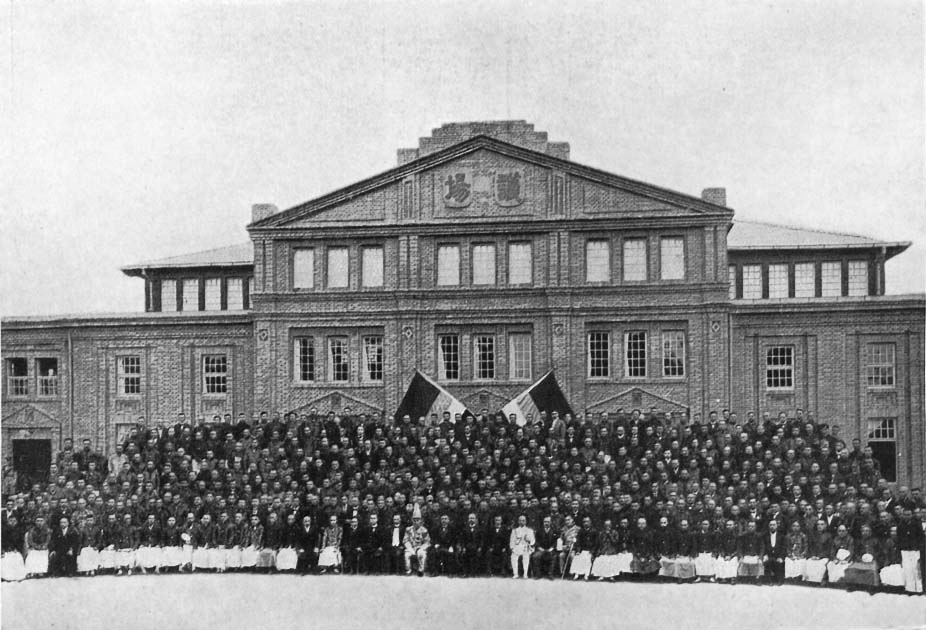
The reopening of the National Assembly of the Republic of China in Beijing on August 1, 1916, following the National Protection War.

The National Protection War symbolized the beginning of the separation between the North and the South after the establishment of the Republic of China. Yuan Shikai was the president of the Republic, but his attempt to become Emperor was thwarted by the military opposition of the southern provinces. Even after the end of Yuan's short-lived monarchy, the Beiyang government in Beijing was no longer able to maintain control over the military leaders of the southern provinces. After the death of Yuan, the Beiyang government lost its leadership over warlords in the provinces and infighting among cliques within the government began in earnest; meanwhile, Sun Yat-sen of the Kuomintang created a military government in Guangzhou in the far south, leading to the protection of the Constitution.

China's Warlord Era would last for years until Chiang Kai-shek unified the country through the Northern Expedition, the Central Plains War and many other civil wars before the onset of the Second Sino-Japanese War and Chinese Civil War.
