= Huang Shaohong =

Chinese general and politician (1895–1966)

- 黃紹竑
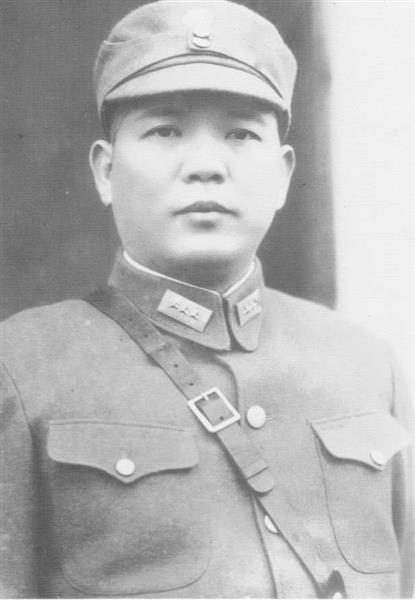
- Huang Shaohong

Governor of Hubei
- In office 1936–1937
- Preceded by: Yang Yongtai

Governor of Zhejiang
- In office 1937–1946
- Preceded by: Zhu Jiahua

Personal details
- Born: 1 December 1895 Rong County, Guangxi, Qing China
- Died: 31 August 1966 (aged 70) Beijing, China
- Party: Kuomintang
- Other political affiliations: Revolutionary Committee of the Chinese Kuomintang
- Education: Guangxi Military Cadre Training School

Military service
- Allegiance: Republic of China
- Branch/service: National Revolutionary Army
- Years of service: 1911–1945
- Rank: General
- Commands: National Revolutionary Army
- Battles/wars: Xinhai Revolution; Northern Expedition; Chinese Civil War; Second Sino-Japanese War

Huang Shaohong
- Traditional Chinese: 黃紹竑
- Simplified Chinese: 黄绍竑
Transcriptions
Standard Mandarin
- Hanyu Pinyin: Huáng Shàohóng
- Wade–Giles: Huang^{2} Shao^{4}-hung^{2}

Huang Shaohong (1 December 1895 – 31 August 1966) was a Chinese general and politician of the Republic of China. With Li Zongren and Bai Chongxi, he was one of the three leaders of the New Guangxi clique, which took control of Guangxi in the mid-1920s, and he headed the provincial administration from 1925 to 1929.

Huang broke with the Guangxi clique in 1930 and joined the Nationalist government, in which he served as minister of the interior from 1932 to 1934 and as chairman of the Zhejiang provincial government from 1934 to 1936 and again from 1937 to 1946, with a short term as chairman of Hubei in between. During the Second Sino-Japanese War, he was deputy commander of the Second War Zone in Shanxi and then led Zhejiang's wartime administration. In 1949, Huang was a member of the Nationalist delegation to the peace negotiations with the Chinese Communist Party in Beiping, and after the talks failed he publicly broke with the Kuomintang in Hong Kong. He held posts in the People's Republic of China, but he was designated a rightist in 1957 and died by suicide during the Cultural Revolution in 1966.

== Early life and education ==
Huang was born on 1 December 1895 in Shanzui Village in Rong County, Guangxi, into a prominent local family of Hakka ethnicity. He was originally named Huang Shaoxiong. His father, Huang Yuliang, passed the provincial civil service examination in 1897 and, after the imperial examinations were abolished, proposed using clan property to fund a school for the family's children.

Huang began school at the age of seven. At thirteen, he went with an elder brother to Guilin to sit the entrance examination of the Guangxi Army Primary School, but he arrived late and spent a year at another school before being admitted to its fourth intake. His schoolmates there included Li Zongren and Bai Chongxi.

After Guangxi declared its independence during the Xinhai Revolution in November 1911, Huang joined a student "Dare-to-Die Corps" that marched to Wuhan, in which he was a squad commander. After the abdication of the Qing emperor in 1912, the student soldiers were sent to a cadet unit in Nanjing, which Huang left without permission. With the help of a relative, he then entered the Third Army Middle School in Wuchang, and three years later he was admitted to the third class of the Baoding Military Academy, where his classmates included Bai Chongxi and Xia Wei. He graduated in 1916 and was assigned to the 1st Division of Lu Rongting's Guangxi army as a cadet officer.

== Rise in Guangxi ==
=== Model Battalion ===
In 1917, Huang joined the Guangxi Model Battalion, a unit of military school graduates commanded by Ma Xiaojun, whose officers also included Bai Chongxi and Xia Wei. He fought in Hunan during the Constitutional Protection War and later received command of a company, and from 1918 his unit carried out operations against bandits in south-western Guangxi.

Because Ma's officers did not come from the districts favoured by the Old Guangxi clique, Lu Rongting and Tan Haoming regarded the unit with suspicion, and during the Guangdong–Guangxi War of 1920 they moved it to Baise, away from the front. In 1921, after Guangdong forces took Nanning, Huang, Bai and Xia declared their support for Sun Yat-sen and Chen Jiongming in Ma's name, and the unit was enlarged to four battalions, with Huang commanding the first. The unit was later surrounded and disarmed at Baise by the self-government army of Liu Rifu, and Huang was captured. Before this, he had collected fees for providing armed escorts to opium shipments and had come to know leaders of the opium trade, and through these contacts he regained his freedom and recruited two or three hundred local militiamen.

In 1922, Huang rejoined Ma Xiaojun's forces, which were ordered to help defend Nanning against the self-government army. Judging that the Guangdong and Guangxi commanders there were preparing to abandon the city, he withdrew his troops across the Yong River instead of reinforcing them, and he later led them through Lingshan to Yulin, where he joined Li Zongren, his former schoolmate, and was given command of a detachment.

=== Wuzhou and the unification of Guangxi ===
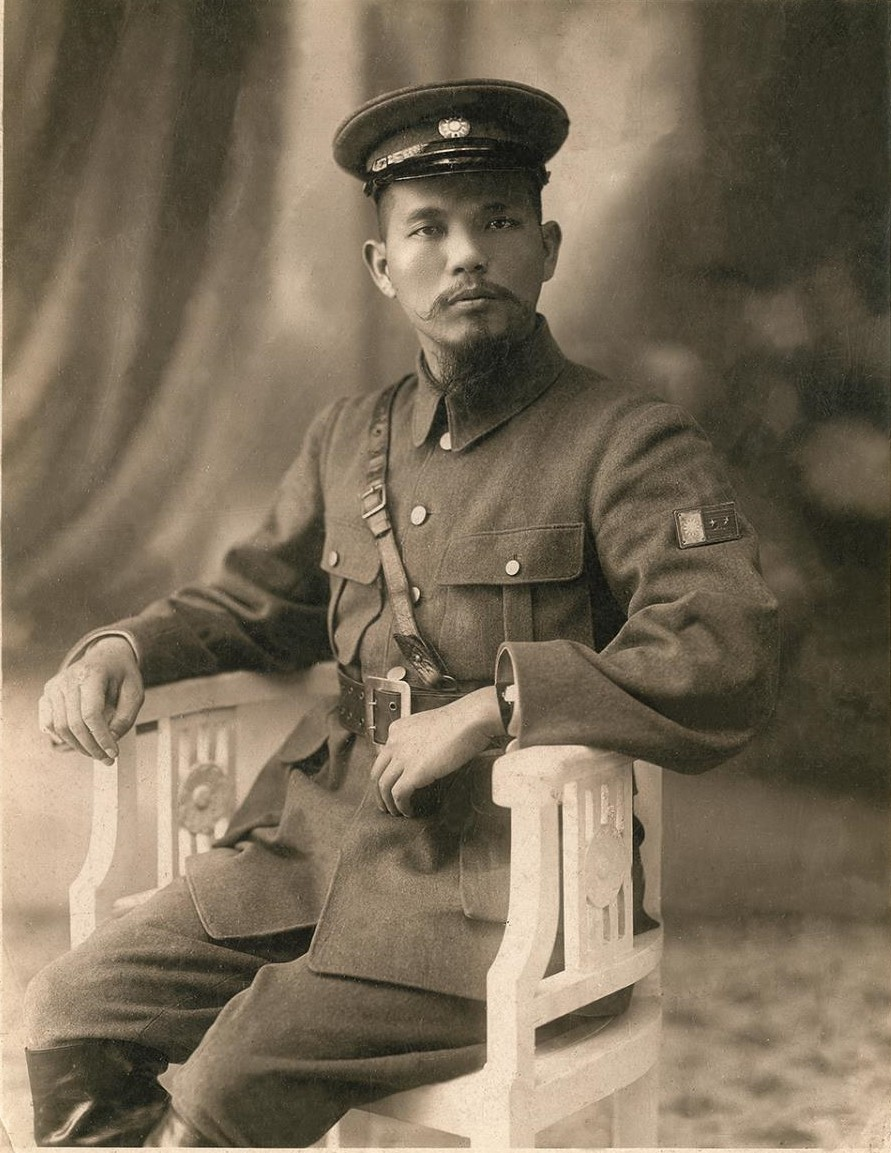
Huang in the 1920s

In 1923, Huang sent his staff officer Chen Xiong and Bai Chongxi to Sun Yat-sen, who appointed him commander-in-chief of the Guangxi Anti-Rebel Army. At the same time, he accepted a brigade command from Shen Hongying, who had declared his support for Wu Peifu, and moved his troops to Rongxu near Wuzhou. When Shen's forces were defeated at Zhaoqing in July 1923, Huang disarmed one of Shen's brigades and declared for Sun, and together with Li Jishen's Guangdong 1st Division he forced the Wuzhou garrison to surrender. In August, Sun appointed him commander of the 5th Division of the Guangxi Anti-Rebel Army. In October, at Li Jishen's suggestion, Huang had Feng Baochu, the former commander of the Wuzhou garrison, detained at a banquet and his brigade disarmed.

Huang's forces grew from about 3,000 to 8,000 men, and after taking Teng County he travelled to Guangzhou, where Sun Yat-sen and Liao Zhongkai gave him 20,000 silver dollars and 20,000 rounds of ammunition. In October 1923, coordinated operations by Huang and Li Zongren drove the self-government army from Guiping and Gui County. In early 1924, Huang and Li Jishen defeated Chen Tiantai, a Guangxi commander in Guangdong who had tried to seize Wuzhou.

Huang argued for an alliance with Shen Hongying against Lu Rongting, whose scattered forces he considered easier to defeat, and he offered to accept Li Zongren as overall leader. Their combined forces captured Nanning on 4 June 1924. When the two armies merged as the Guangxi Pacification and Anti-Rebel Army, Huang proposed Li Zongren as commander-in-chief and became deputy commander, with Bai Chongxi as chief of staff. By August 1924, most of Guangxi apart from its north-east was under their control.

At the end of 1924, Huang joined the Kuomintang with Liao Zhongkai and Xu Chongzhi as his sponsors, and he became commander of the Second Guangxi Army. In early 1925, the Guangxi leaders defeated Shen Hongying and then repelled an invasion by the Yunnan forces of Tang Jiyao. Huang led the counter-attack at Kunlun Pass in May 1925 and the defence of Liuzhou, where the column of Tang Jiyu was defeated and forced back into Yunnan. By the autumn of 1925, Huang, Li and Bai controlled all of Guangxi.

=== Head of the Guangxi government ===
In July 1925, the Guangxi leaders set up a civil administration office as the province's highest administrative body, with Huang as its head, and he also served as head of the finance department and as the Kuomintang's party commissioner for Guangxi. In January 1926, Huang and Li Zongren were elected alternate members of the Kuomintang Central Supervisory Committee at the party's second national congress. He then negotiated Guangxi's integration into the Guangzhou-based Nationalist government, under which the Guangxi forces became the Seventh Army of the National Revolutionary Army, with Huang as its party representative. A provincial government was set up on 1 June 1926, with Huang as chairman of its council. He favoured delaying the Northern Expedition, but he agreed to stay in Guangxi with half of the provincial forces while Li Zongren led the rest north.

The historian Huang Zongyan has credited Huang's administration of Guangxi between 1925 and 1929 with significant improvements in the province's finances, transport and education. The new government replaced many officials of the Lu Rongting era and introduced examinations for county magistrates. It unified the currency through a mint at Wuzhou, founded the Bank of Guangxi and replaced the likin transit tax with a single levy. Provincial revenue rose from about six or seven million yuan in 1925 to over 22 million yuan in 1927, largely through taxes on opium. By early 1929, about 2,000 kilometres of roads had been built, compared with 130 kilometres before 1925, and several state-run factories had been set up. Spending on education increased, and Huang chaired the preparatory committee of Guangxi University, which opened in October 1928 with Ma Junwu as its president.

=== Purge of 1927 ===
Huang attended the meeting convened by Chiang Kai-shek in Shanghai on 2 April 1927, where he argued for an early purge of Communists from the Kuomintang. On 9 April, he and members of the Central Supervisory Committee, including Cai Yuanpei, Wu Zhihui and Zhang Jingjiang, issued a telegram accusing the Kuomintang's Wuhan leadership of misconduct. He then ordered a purge of Communists in Guangxi from 12 April, as well as an offensive against the peasant movement led by Wei Baqun.

Later in 1927, as commander of the Fifteenth Army, Huang fought the forces of Ye Ting and He Long after the Nanchang uprising, defeating them at Chaozhou and Shantou. In October 1927, he escaped an attempt by supporters of Wang Jingwei to detain him in Guangzhou. He then supported Li Jishen against Zhang Fakui and Huang Qixiang, and his forces fought them in eastern Guangdong in December 1927, before he returned to Guangxi in April 1928.

=== Conflict with Nanjing and departure ===
Huang in The Young Companion (1929)

At the troop disbandment conference of 1929, Huang supported Chiang Kai-shek's plans, unlike the other Guangxi leaders. After the Guangxi forces in Hubei were defeated in the Chiang-Gui War in 1929, Chiang ordered Huang to arrest Li Zongren and Bai Chongxi and to reduce the Guangxi forces to two divisions, which he did not do. The Guangxi forces under Bai Chongxi then attacked Guangdong without success, and Huang and Bai left for Hong Kong by way of French Indochina. In November 1929, the three leaders returned to Guangxi and formed an army opposed to Nanjing, with Li as commander-in-chief, Huang as deputy commander and governor of Guangxi, and Bai as field commander.

During the Central Plains War in 1930, Huang opposed the decision of Li and Bai to send the Guangxi army into Hunan. After the army was defeated near Hengyang, he told Bai that he wished to give up military affairs. He opposed continuing the civil war and broke with the Guangxi clique later that year. After issuing a telegram announcing his resignation and calling for peace, he left Guangxi that winter.

== Nationalist government ==
=== Minister of the Interior ===
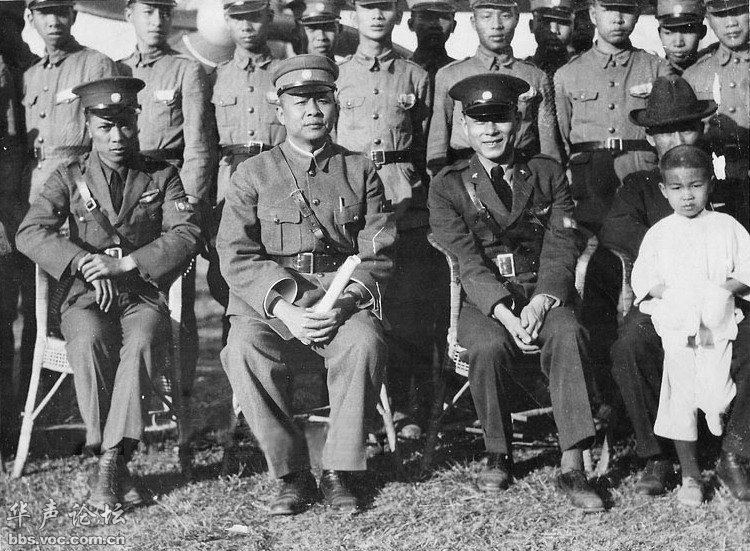
Huang (second from left) with Republic of China Air Force officers

In Nanjing, Chiang Kai-shek appointed Huang military rehabilitation commissioner for Guangxi and gave him 200,000 yuan to win over the Guangxi forces, but Huang stayed in Shanghai and Hong Kong and took no action against his former colleagues. In February 1932, he became a member of the National Government and minister of the interior under Wang Jingwei's Executive Yuan, and he later also served as acting minister of communications. As minister, he held a national conference on internal affairs and promoted local self-government and the baojia system.

During the Defense of the Great Wall in 1933, Huang was chief of staff of the Beiping branch of the Military Affairs Commission under He Yingqin. He supported the resignation of Zhang Xueliang after the loss of Rehe. In May 1933, as Japanese forces approached Beiping, he argued for opening ceasefire talks before Chiang's instructions arrived, and the negotiations led to the Tanggu Truce at the end of that month. Later in 1933, while on a mission to southern China for Chiang, he secretly joined Li Jishen and Chen Mingshu in planning opposition to Chiang, but he took no part in the Fujian rebellion when it began in November.

=== Inner Mongolia and Xinjiang ===
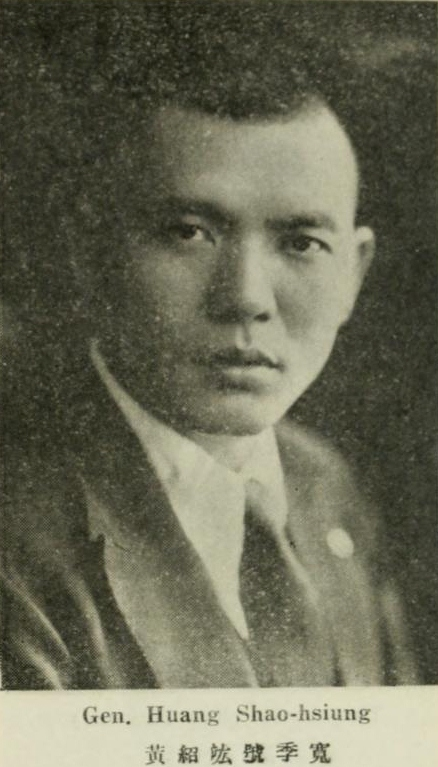
Huang featured in Who's who in China publication

In October 1933, the government sent Huang to Bailingmiao as a pacification envoy to the Inner Mongolian princes, led by Demchugdongrub, who were demanding autonomy. He rejected their demands for an autonomous government with its own army and laws, and after negotiations the princes accepted a revised arrangement. According to the historian Hsiao-ting Lin, Huang promised the princes that they could form an autonomous political committee, which led to the creation of the Mongol Local Autonomy Political Affairs Committee in 1934.

In January 1934, Huang proposed a military expedition to bring Xinjiang under the control of the central government, and in April he set up a preparatory office in Beiping. The preparations centred on motor transport, including the purchase of vehicles, the training of about 1,000 drivers and the storage of fuel at Jiuquan. According to Lin, Chiang Kai-shek withdrew the planned force after learning of the Soviet invasion of Xinjiang, to avoid a clash with Soviet troops, leaving Ma Zhongying without reinforcements against Sheng Shicai. The historian Ouyang Yunzi has attributed the cancellation both to fears of Soviet intervention and to Chiang's reluctance to let the Guangxi clique expand into the northwest. Ouyang has also argued that the plan encouraged later road building in the north-west and the founding in 1936 of the China Motor Corporation, a joint venture with Daimler-Benz. Huang formally resigned as minister of the interior in December 1934.

=== Zhejiang and Hubei ===
In December 1934, after the death of Lu Diping, Huang became chairman of the Zhejiang provincial government and head of its civil affairs department. Most other department heads were chosen by Chiang, and Huang aligned himself with the Political Science Clique to reduce tensions between the CC Clique and officers from the Whampoa Military Academy. He organised militia training and the building of fortified defence lines from Zhapu to Jiaxing and from Wuxi to Jiangyin. In November 1935, he was elected to the Kuomintang Central Supervisory Committee.

During the Liangguang Incident of 1936, the government announced in July that Huang would become pacification commissioner of Guangxi and that Bai Chongxi would move to Zhejiang. Huang declined the post, warning that the plan would lead to war, and he and Cheng Qian instead went to Nanning to negotiate a settlement under which Li Zongren and Bai Chongxi remained in charge of Guangxi. After the Xi'an Incident in December 1936, he agreed to serve as chief of staff of the forces under He Yingqin that were assembled against Zhang Xueliang, while also asking Yan Xishan in Taiyuan to mediate. That month, after the assassination of Yang Yongtai, he was appointed chairman of Hubei, and he took office in January 1937.

=== Second Sino-Japanese War ===
After the Marco Polo Bridge incident in July 1937, Huang briefly headed the operations department of the Military Affairs Commission. In September 1937, he was given the rank of lieutenant general with the honorary rank of general. He was then appointed deputy commander of the Second War Zone under Yan Xishan in Shanxi, where he commanded the defence of Niangziguan while Yan directed the main front at Xinkou. In October, Japanese forces outflanked the Niangziguan positions through Guguan, and after Yangquan fell the defending forces withdrew. Huang disagreed with Yan's plan for the defence of Taiyuan, which fell soon afterwards, and he returned to Nanjing.

In late 1937, Huang returned to Zhejiang as provincial chairman and commander of its peace preservation forces, posts he held until 1946. After Hangzhou fell, the provincial government moved to Jinhua. In February 1938, it issued the ten-point "Zhejiang Wartime Political Programme", which called for mobilising the population, reforming administration and taxation, and punishing collaborators. The programme was drafted by Zhang Xichang, a Communist working in the provincial reconstruction department, and was reprinted by the Communist newspaper Xinhua Daily on 1 March 1938. Some of Huang's critics in the Kuomintang accused him of treating Zhejiang as his own domain.

With help from personnel recommended by Zhou Enlai, Huang set up wartime political work teams and youth training corps. By the end of 1939, the political work teams had over 3,000 members, many of them Communists. In 1938, he mediated an agreement under which the Communist forces of Liu Ying and Su Yu left the Fujian–Zhejiang border region for areas behind Japanese lines. In June 1938, Chiang criticised Huang's administration, and in 1940 the political work teams were transferred to the Three Principles of the People Youth Corps. Huang also commanded a provincial self-defence corps, which grew to nearly 100,000 men by 1939 and was abolished at the end of 1941.

To supply these forces, Huang founded the Zhejiang Iron Works in the mountains of Lishui, which by the early 1940s produced over 1,000 rifles a month as well as light machine guns and grenades. He took part in designing weapons himself, including a rifle grenade launcher named the "77" and an electrically triggered mine, and he developed a cipher machine that was completed in 1941. After the war, the Military Affairs Commission awarded him a first-class gold medal for this work. His government also introduced grain controls, state sales monopolies on cigarettes, salt and matches, and the collection of land tax in kind, a measure he proposed at a Kuomintang plenary session in 1940.

Huang offered his resignation several times during the war, and in 1946 he was removed as chairman and replaced by Shen Honglie.

== Post-war period ==
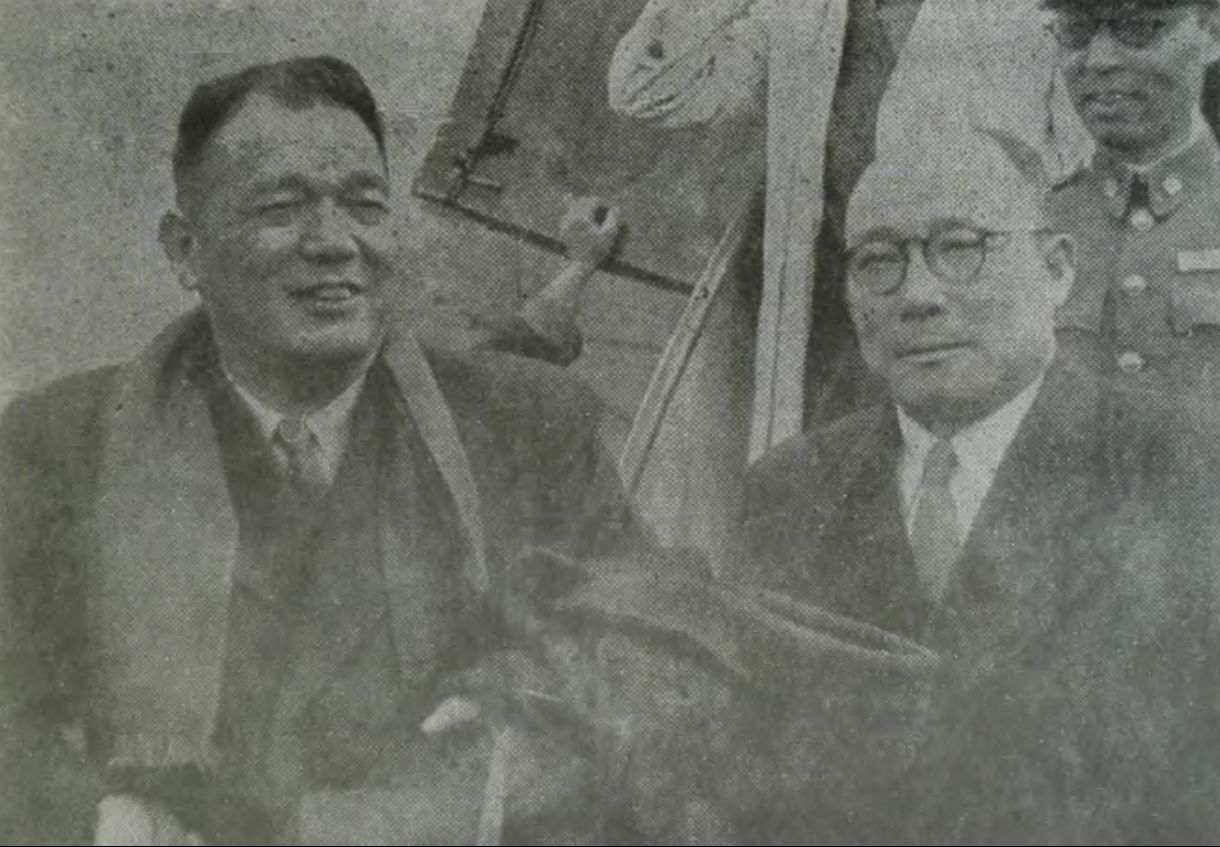
Huang with Qu Wu

After leaving Zhejiang, Huang was a member of the Legislative Yuan, and in 1947 he served as vice-president of the Control Yuan from June to October before becoming a member of the National Government. In January 1948, he took part in Hong Kong in founding the Revolutionary Committee of the Chinese Kuomintang with Li Jishen and others.

In 1948, Huang managed Li Zongren's campaign for the vice-presidency in the National Assembly. When Chiang's supporters backed Sun Fo, Huang persuaded Li to withdraw temporarily in protest against attacks on his candidacy, and the assembly suspended the vote. Li re-entered the contest and defeated Sun Fo in the final round on 29 April 1948 by 1,438 votes to 1,295. Later that year, Huang declined Chiang's offer of the chairmanship of Anhui, and he encouraged Bai Chongxi to take up his new command in Wuhan. In early 1949, at Bai's request, he went to Hong Kong, where he contacted Communist representatives on Bai's behalf.

=== Peace talks and break with the Kuomintang ===
In April 1949, Huang was one of the delegates, led by Zhang Zhizhong, whom acting president Li Zongren sent to Beiping for peace negotiations with the Communists. During the talks, he met Mao Zedong and Zhu De. The delegation sent Huang and Qu Wu to Nanjing with the Communist draft agreement, but Li Zongren did not sign it, and a meeting of the Executive Yuan under He Yingqin rejected it. Huang then resigned as a delegate and left for Hong Kong by way of Guangzhou on 24 April. In June 1949, American diplomats reported that he had advised Li Zongren to make his own peace with the Communists.

On 13 August 1949, Huang, Liu Fei, Long Yun, He Yaozu and 40 other Nationalist figures issued a statement in Hong Kong renouncing the Kuomintang government and declaring their support for cooperation with the Communist Party. The American consul general in Hong Kong reported at the time that Huang, Liu Fei and other former supporters of Li Zongren were advocating a peaceful settlement and advising Li to capitulate. On 14 September 1949, the Nationalist government ordered the arrest of the 44 signatories. That month, Huang travelled to Beiping and attended the first plenary session of the Chinese People's Political Consultative Conference (CPPCC) as a specially invited delegate.

== People's Republic of China ==
After the founding of the People's Republic in October 1949, Huang became a member of the Government Administration Council and of the CPPCC National Committee. In September 1954, he was elected a member of the Standing Committee of the National People's Congress. In 1956, he became a member of the central standing committee of the Revolutionary Committee of the Chinese Kuomintang, and in 1957 he was appointed deputy director of its Taiwan Liberation Work Committee.

During the Hundred Flowers Campaign, Huang criticised the practice in some localities of Communist Party committees taking over the functions of the government. In June 1957, during the Anti-Rightist Campaign, he was designated a rightist, and in July he was required to make a self-criticism along with Luo Longji, Zhang Naiqi, Zhang Bojun and Chen Mingshu. He remained a member of the NPC Standing Committee and of the CPPCC National Committee, to which he was reappointed in 1959 and 1965. In July 1965, he was among those who welcomed Li Zongren at Beijing airport on his return to China from the United States.

On 31 August 1966, after the Cultural Revolution had begun, Huang visited Li Zongren and told Cheng Siyuan that he was worried about Li. That day, after his home had been raided and he had been beaten by Red Guards, Huang died by suicide at his home in Beijing, cutting his throat with a razor. He was 70 years old. On 27 June 1980, he was posthumously rehabilitated and a memorial service was held for him in Beijing on 31 December 1980.

== Personal life ==
Huang's first wife, surnamed Wei, had two daughters. His concubine Cai Fengzhen had three sons and a daughter, and during the war she headed the Zhejiang branch of the Wartime Child Welfare Association. Another concubine, Huang Ruihua, had one son, and the two divorced after 1949.

Huang wrote a large body of ci poetry. Between June 1944 and July 1945, he wrote a memoir, Recollections at Fifty, which was published in 1999.

== Legacy ==
Huang's former residence in Rong County and his villa in the county town of Rong County were listed as a Major Historical and Cultural Site Protected at the National Level in 2006.
