= Li Zongren =

Chinese warlord, politician, and general (1890–1969)

- 李宗仁
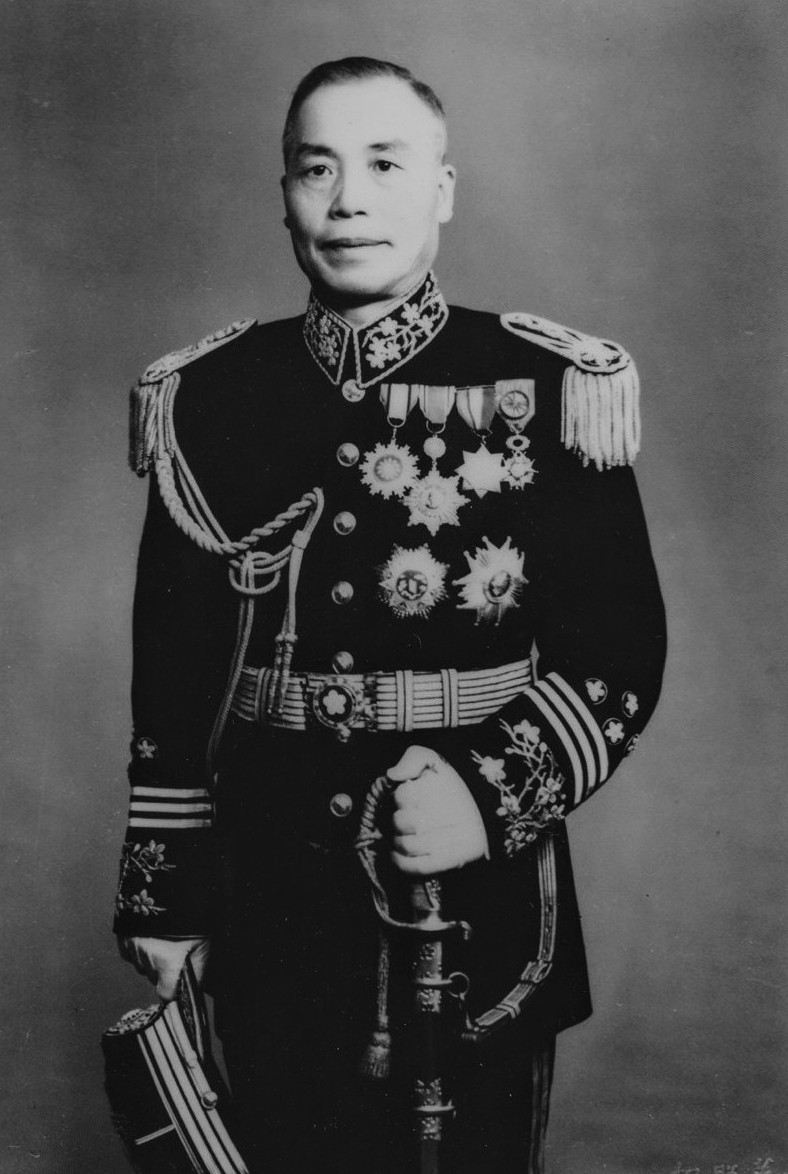
- Li Zongren in 1943

President of the Republic of China
- Acting; 21 January 1949 – 20 November 1949
- Premier: He Yingqin; Yan Xishan
- Vice President: Himself
- Preceded by: Chiang Kai-shek
- Succeeded by: Mao Zedong; Yan Xishan (acting); Chiang Kai-shek

1st Vice President of the Republic of China
- In office 20 May 1948 – 12 March 1954
- President: Chiang Kai-shek; Himself (acting)
- Preceded by: Position established (Feng Guozhang in 1917)
- Succeeded by: Chen Cheng

Personal details
- Born: 13 August 1890 Xixiang Village, Guilin, Guangxi, China
- Died: 30 January 1969 (aged 78) Beijing, China
- Party: Kuomintang
- Spouses: Li Xiuwen; Guo Dejie (m.1924–1966); Hu Yousong (m.1966–1969)

Military service
- Allegiance: Republic of China
- Branch/service: National Revolutionary Army
- Years of service: 1916–1954
- Rank: General (ROC Army)
- Battles/wars: See battles: Northern Expedition; Central Plains War; Second Sino-Japanese War; Battle of Xuzhou; Battle of Tai'erzhuang; Battle of Wuhan; Battle of Suixian–Zaoyang; 1939–1940 Winter Offensive; Battle of Zaoyang–Yichang; Central Hubei Operation; Battle of South Henan; Western Hubei Operation

Chinese name
- Chinese: 李宗仁
Transcriptions
Standard Mandarin
- Hanyu Pinyin: Lǐ Zōngrén
- Wade–Giles: Li^{3} Tsung^{1}-jen^{2}
Southern Min
- Hokkien POJ: Lí Chong-jîn

Li Zongren (Chinese: 李宗仁; pinyin: Lǐ Zōngrén, 13 August 1890 – 30 January 1969), also known as Li Tsung-jen, courtesy name Delin (Te-lin, 德鄰, pinyin: Délín), was a Chinese warlord, military commander and politician. He was vice-president and acting president of the Republic of China under the 1947 Constitution.

With Bai Chongxi and Huang Shaohong, Li led the New Guangxi Clique, which unified Guangxi in 1925. He commanded the Seventh Army and later the Fourth Army Group of the National Revolutionary Army in the Northern Expedition, and he then fought against Chiang Kai-shek in 1929 and in the Central Plains War of 1930. During the Second Sino-Japanese War, he commanded the Fifth War Zone and directed the Chinese victory at the Battle of Tai'erzhuang in 1938. Elected vice-president in 1948, he became acting president when Chiang stepped aside in January 1949, but his attempt to negotiate a settlement with the Communists failed. He left for the United States in December 1949, was removed as vice-president in 1954 and returned to mainland China in 1965, where he died in Beijing in 1969.

== Early life ==
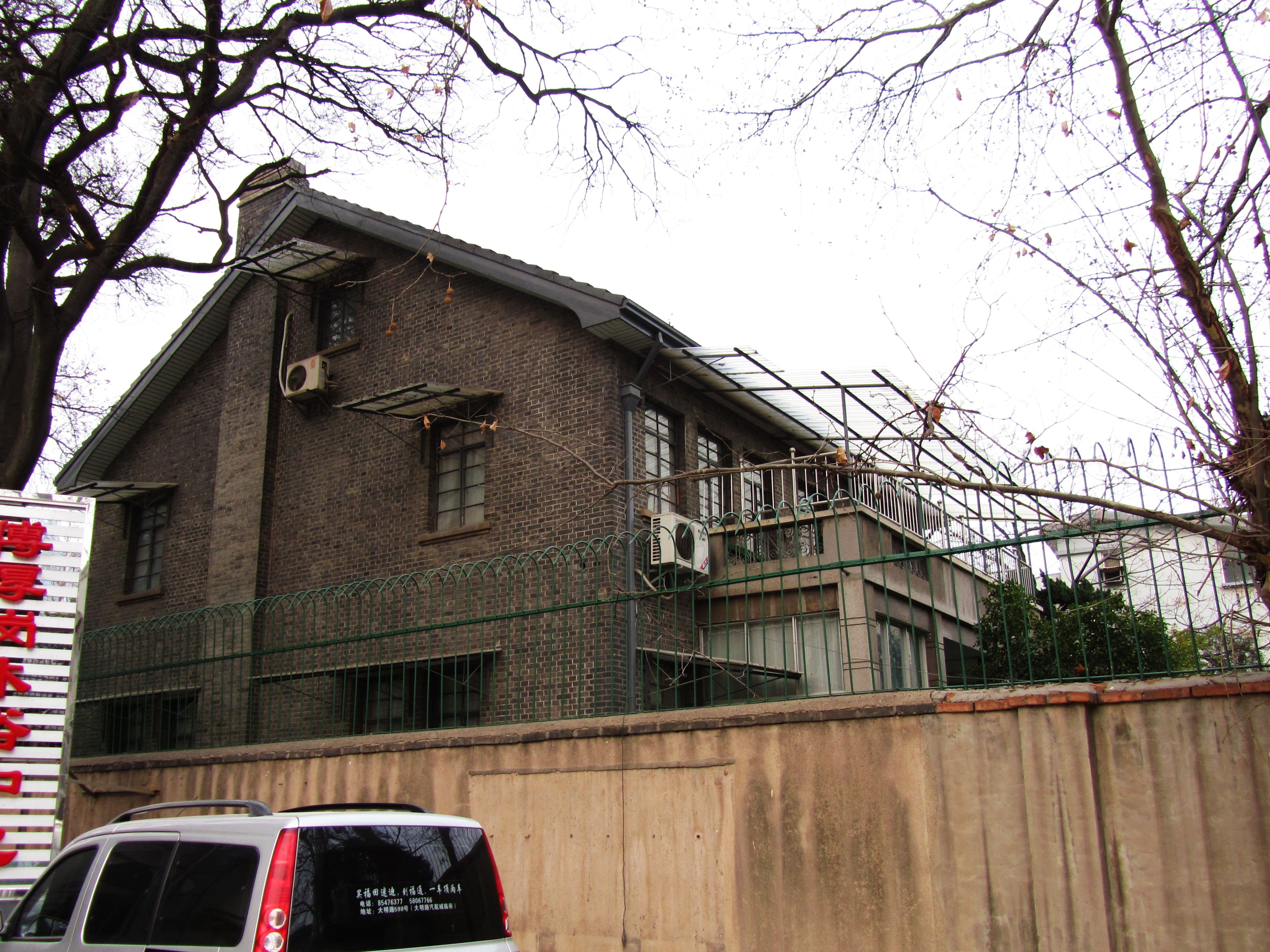
Former residence of Li, now a museum.

Li Zongren was born in Xixiang Village, near Guilin in Guangxi, the second eldest in a Han family of five boys and three girls. Some sources, including the Berkshire Encyclopedia of China, give his year of birth as 1891. His father, Li Peiying, was a village schoolmaster. After a patchy education Li enrolled in a provincial military school. He joined the Tongmenghui, the revolutionary party of Sun Yat-sen, in 1910 but had little understanding at that time of Sun's wider goals of reform and national reunification.

According to an account by Yin Chenggang, Li entered the third class of the Guangxi Army Primary School in the spring of 1908, and in 1912 he entered the Guangxi Army Accelerated School, from which he graduated in the autumn of 1913. He then spent three months as a trainee at an officers' training institute and briefly taught physical education at a model primary school in Guilin, on a monthly salary of 16 yuan.

== Military service ==
Schooled under Cai E, Li graduated from the Guilin Military Cadre Training School and in 1916 became a platoon commander in the army of Guangxi warlord Lu Rongting. Li's direct superior was Lin Hu. Lu, the governor of Guangxi, was a former bandit who had ambitions to expand into neighboring provinces, especially Guangdong. For the next few years the warlords of Guangxi and Guangdong were involved in mutually destructive battles, and both occupied portions of each other's territory at various times. Lu and his closest associates were collectively known as the Old Guangxi Clique.

In 1916, during the National Protection War, Li joined the National Protection Army as a lieutenant and platoon commander. In 1917, after a regiment of Lin Hu's forces entered Hunan, he became a company commander, and he was later wounded in Hunan and promoted to battalion commander. In the spring of 1919, his battalion returned to Guangdong and was stationed at Danshui on the East River to face the Guangdong Army of Chen Jiongming. At the end of 1920, he was stationed in Xingye County, near Yulin.

In 1921 Li Zongren accompanied Lin Hu and Lu Rongting in Lu's second invasion of Guangdong, attacking forces under the command of Chen Jiongming. When Lu's invasion suffered a disastrous defeat, Li led the rear guard when the Old Guangxi Clique forces retreated. Most of Lin Hu's officers were former bandits and militia recruited earlier by Lin from the Zhuang areas of Guangdong. During the campaign many of Lin's officers defected to the Guangdong forces, taking their units with them. In the face of defeat Li Zongren's battalion shrunk to about 1000 men and "sank into the grasses" in order to escape. In 1921, Chen Jiongguang of the Guangdong Army named Li commander of the Third Route of the Guangdong–Guangxi Border Defence Army.

=== Rise to power ===
After Lu's defeat, most of his army dissolved into independent bands of soldiers, many of whom resorted to banditry in order to survive. Foreign missionaries and aid workers active in Guangxi at this time reported that banditry in Guangxi was extremely common and severe, with bandits commonly looting all food and valuables from undefended villages and resorting to murder and public cannibalism in order to extort ransoms from the relatives of people they kidnapped. Li, intending to become more than a bandit, began building a personal military force of professional soldiers that became the equal of any group of bandits or Zhuang irregulars that Lu Rongting drew on in his war to re-establish his power in Guangxi. The civil governor of Guangxi, Ma Junwu, appointed Li commander of the Fifth Brigade of the Guangxi Army, and Li then styled himself commander-in-chief of the Second Army of the Guangxi Self-Government Army. In 1922, he absorbed the forces of his old friend and colleague Huang Shaohong.

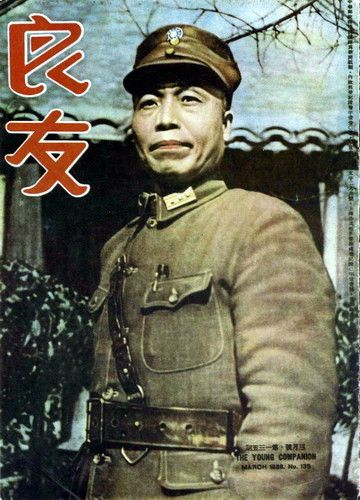
Li Zongren on the cover of the Liángyǒu pictorial.

As chaos became the norm in Guangxi, Li became the independent commander of an area several counties large on the Guangdong border, and the administration of Li and Huang was credited with keeping the area they controlled relatively free of the bandits and petty battles that plagued Guangxi at the time. In 1923, their Dinggui Army and Taozei Army were merged into the Dinggui Taozei Allied Army, with Li as commander, Huang Shaohong as deputy commander, Bai Chongxi as chief of staff and Huang Xuchu as deputy chief of staff. In 1924, while Lu was besieged by rebels in Guilin, Li and his colleagues peacefully occupied the provincial capital, Nanning. Lu then fled and took refuge in French Indochina. The next month Sun Yat-sen, from his base of operations in Guangdong, recognized Li Zongren and his allies Huang Shaohong and Bai Chongxi as the rulers of Guangxi. Together they became known as the New Guangxi Clique. According to the historian Wu Yuankang, Li joined the Kuomintang at the end of 1924. In the summer of 1925, he defeated Lu Rongting and Shen Hongying and unified Guangxi.

=== Kuomintang general ===
Li reorganized his forces as the "Guangxi Pacification Army". He was named the Commander in Chief, Huang Shaohong the deputy Commander and Bai Chongxi the Chief of Staff. By August they had driven all other contenders out of the province. Li Zongren was military governor of Guangxi from 1924 to 1925 and from 1925 to 1949 Guangxi remained under his influence.

In 1926 Li allowed his soldiers to enroll in Kuomintang armies, but kept personal control of his troops. A Soviet adviser was sent to Guangxi, and Li's forces were renamed the Seventh Army Corps. After meeting with Wang Jingwei in January, Li joined the Northern Expedition in the summer of 1926, as commander of the Seventh Army of the National Revolutionary Army. In April 1928, Chiang Kai-shek ordered the armies stationed in Hunan and Hubei to join the expedition as the Fourth Army Group, with Li as its commander-in-chief. The army group was composed of the Guangxi Army and other provincial forces amounting to 16 corps and six independent divisions.

Li's first victories as a Nationalist general were in Hunan and Hubei, where he defeated rival warlord Wu Peifu in two successive battles, and his forces took part in the capture of Wuhan in 1926. After these victories Li became a famous and popular general within the KMT, and his army became variously known as the "Flying Army" and the "Army of Steel". When Wang Jingwei installed a left-leaning KMT faction in Wuhan, Borodin attempted to recruit Li to join the Communists, but Li was loyal to Chiang Kai-shek and refused. Against the advice of his Soviet advisors, Li then marched up the north side of the Yangtze to attack the forces of warlord Sun Chuanfang. Sun was the leader of the "League of Five Provinces" (Zhejiang, Fujian, Jiangsu, Anhui and Jiangxi), and successfully halted Chiang's advance into his territory in Jiangxi. Li went on to defeat Sun in three successive battles, securing his territories for the KMT. Li was a leading figure in the split between the Nationalist governments in Nanjing and Wuhan in 1927 and in the Battle of Longtan.

By the time Li Zongren defeated Sun Chuanfang, he had gained a reputation as being strongly opposed to communism and highly suspicious of the Comintern in China, and his army was one of the few KMT detachments free from serious Communist influence. After being assured of his support, Chiang had Li's units redeployed to the new capital of Nanjing. He then used Li's Guangxi armies to purge his own First Division of Communists. In the resulting White Terror, thousands of suspected Communists were summarily executed. Li's close subordinate, Bai Chongxi, was notable for his important role in this purge.

In April 1928 Li, with Bai Chongxi, led the Fourth Army group in an advance on Beijing, capturing Handan, Baoding and Shijiazhuang by 1 June. Zhang Zuolin withdrew from Beijing on 3 June, and Li's army seized the city and Tianjin. After the fall of Wang Jingwei's government in Wuhan and the expulsion of all Soviet advisors from KMT-held territories, Li was put in charge of one of five KMT political councils set up to administer KMT-controlled territories, based in Wuhan, while remaining commander of the Fourth Army Group.

In February 1929, according to Li's memoirs, Chiang secretly sent large quantities of arms and ammunition through Jiangxi to Lu Diping, whose 18th Division was nominally under Li's command. When the shipments became known, Li's generals in Wuhan, Xia Wei, Hu Zongduo and Tao Jun, feared an attack, and after He Jian told them that the central government had completed its dispositions, they moved against Lu without Li's orders. On 21 February 1929, they issued a telegram in the name of the Wuhan Political Council dismissing Lu from all his posts. Li, fearing retribution, uncharacteristically fled to the foreign concessions in Shanghai. Chiang then arranged for Li and his two closest subordinates to be stripped of their posts within the government and expelled from the Party for life.

=== Return to Guangxi ===
After his falling out with Chiang Kai-shek, Li Zongren returned to Guangxi and devoted himself to that province's internal administration, with some success. In 1929 he supported Shanxi warlord Yan Xishan in his attempt to form an alternative central government based in Beijing, leading to the Central Plains War. Li led troops to reconquer Hunan as far north as Yueyang, before Chiang's decisive defeat of Yan and his ally, Feng Yuxiang, forced Li to withdraw back to Guangxi.

Following Yan's defeat in the Central Plains War, Li allied with Chen Jitang after Chen became the chairman of the government of Guangdong in 1931, and prepared to battle Chiang Kai-shek. On 28 May 1931, Li arrived in Guangzhou. Another civil war would have broken out if Japan had not invaded Manchuria, prompting Li and Chiang to end their hostilities and unite against the Empire of Japan. In 1932, after the New Guangxi Clique reorganized the Bank of Guangxi, it opened a branch in Hong Kong, and in September 1932 Li spent several days in the colony hosting banquets for Chinese businessmen and bankers. On 27 March 1935, the Central Political Council made Li a general of the first rank.

=== Second Sino-Japanese War ===
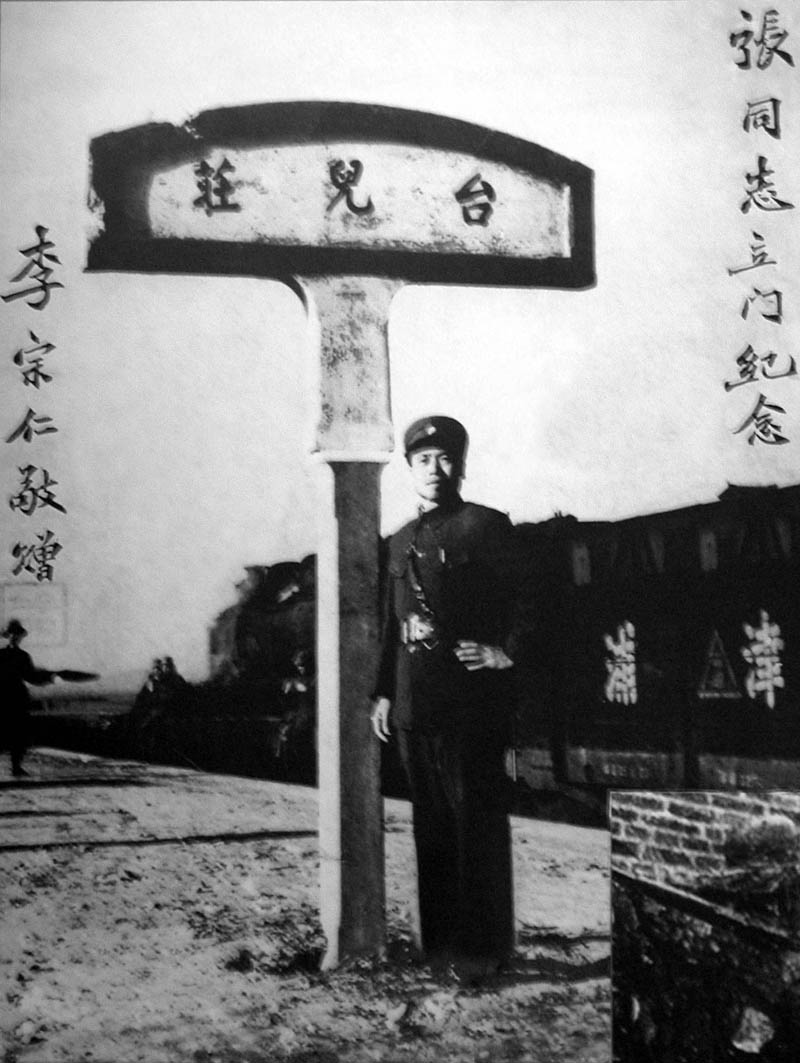
Li Zongren posing after the successful defense of Tai'erzhuang.

During the Xi'an Incident, Li sent a telegram on 20 December 1936 urging Zhang Xueliang to send Chiang back to Nanjing. On 26 February 1937, the Nationalist government appointed him concurrently commander-in-chief of the Fifth Route Army, with Bai Chongxi as his deputy. In 1937 full-scale war between Japan and China broke out, beginning the Second Sino-Japanese War (1937–45). Chiang Kai-shek attempted to make use of Li's military experience by promoting him to be the director of the KMT Fifth War Zone. Li's first action against the Japanese came in the 1938 Battle of Tai'erzhuang, after the Communist Zhou Enlai (who was aiding the Nationalists as part of the United Front) recognized Li as the most capable Nationalist general available and used his influence to have Li appointed overall commander, despite Chiang's reservations about Li's loyalty.

Under Li's command the defense of Tai'erzhuang was a major victory for the Chinese, killing 20,000–30,000 Japanese soldiers and capturing a large amount of supplies and equipment. The victory was principally credited to Li's planning and use of tactics, luring the Japanese into a trap and then annihilating them. The battle of Tai'erzhuang was one of the first major Chinese victories in the war against Japan, proving that with good weapons and inspired leadership Chinese armies could hold their own. Li also participated in the Battle of Xuzhou, Battle of Wuhan, Battle of Suixian–Zaoyang, 1939–1940 Winter Offensive, Battle of Zaoyang–Yichang, Central Hubei Operation, and Battle of South Henan.

At the end of 1943, Chiang, wary of the growing strength of the Guangxi faction, moved Li from the Fifth War Zone to the post of director of the Generalissimo's Headquarters at Hanzhong. The government formally appointed him on 10 February 1945, and Liu Zhi took over the Fifth War Zone. This was a virtual and unwanted retirement from active command after his earlier successes. Li spent the last years of the war grumbling about his enforced inactivity.

=== Chinese Civil War ===
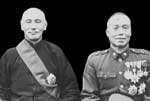
Li Zongren and Chiang Kai-shek.

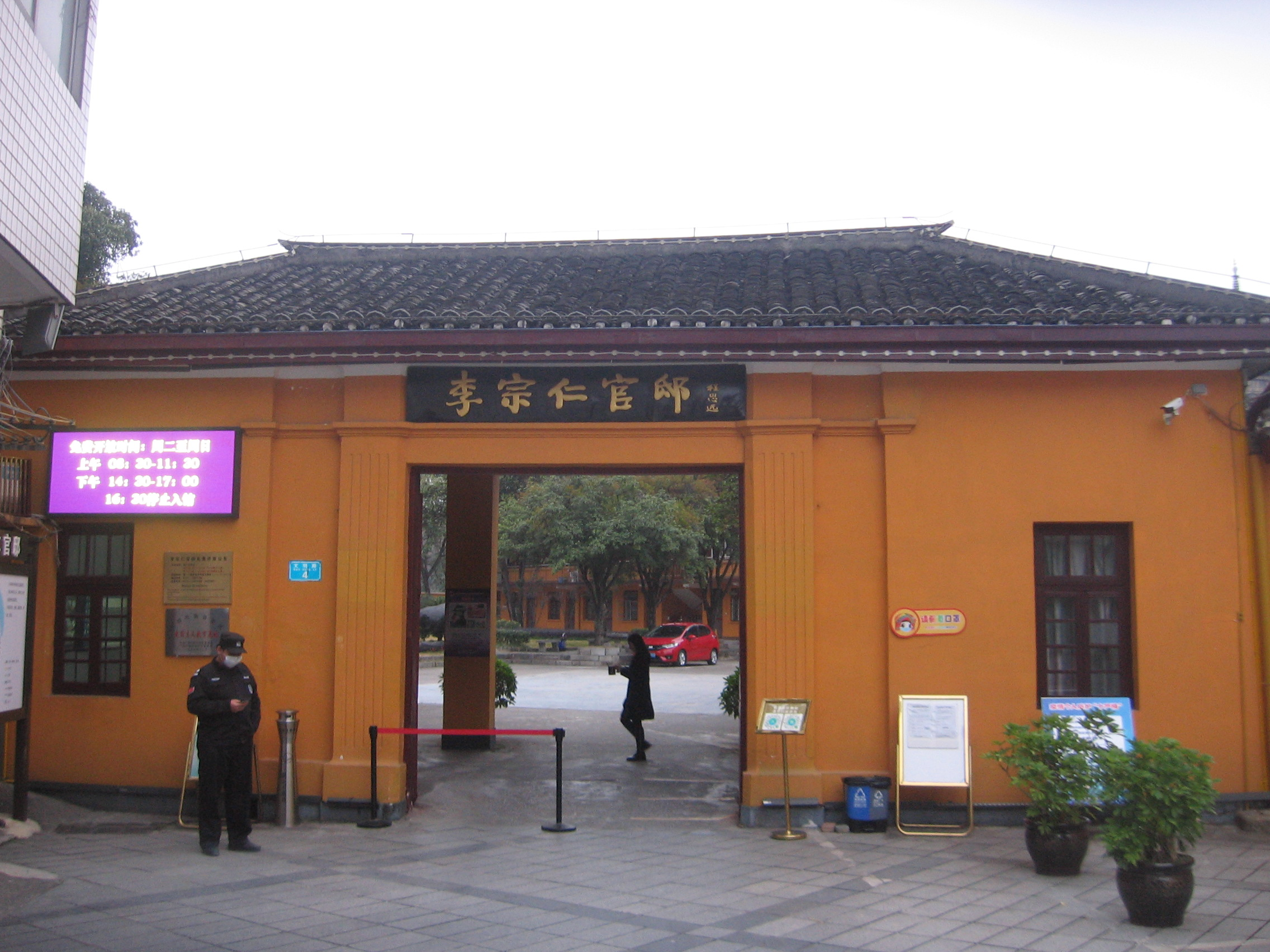
Former residence of Li Zongren in Guilin.

On 1 September 1945, the Nationalist government appointed Li director of the Generalissimo's Beiping Headquarters. This was a post without effective power, and he was sidelined from command in the early part of the Chinese Civil War. In February 1947, he attended farewell receptions for the departing Communist members of the military mediation Executive Headquarters in Beiping, including Ye Jianying, and on 28 February he took part in a conference in Beiping on strategy against the Communists in northern China. He also ordered that press freedom be protected, and press censorship was ended in Tianjin.

== Political career ==
=== Vice-presidential election ===
On the night of 3 April 1948, Chiang told Li that the party had chosen Sun Fo as its candidate for vice-president and asked him to withdraw, but Li replied that his preparations were too far advanced for him to stop. With the help of Huang Shaohong, Li joined Yu Youren and Cheng Qian in opposing the party's nomination of the vice-presidential candidate, and he won the support of local cadres of the Three Principles of the People Youth League and members of the Whampoa faction who opposed the CC Clique of Chen Lifu and Chen Guofu. Six candidates stood for vice-president, namely Sun Fo, Yu Youren, Li, Cheng Qian, Mo Dehui and Xu Fulin.

In the first ballot on 23 April 1948, Li led with 754 votes to Sun Fo's 559 and Cheng Qian's 522, and he also led the second and third ballots. On 29 April, in a fourth ballot between the two leading candidates, Li won 1,438 votes to Sun's 1,295 and was elected vice-president by the National Assembly. According to a 2006 account by China Radio International, when a radio announcer reported that Li had won, Chiang kicked over the radio in anger. Before the inauguration, Chiang instructed Li to wear military uniform, but at the ceremony on 20 May 1948 Chiang himself wore a traditional long gown and mandarin jacket, so that Li looked like Chiang's aide. Li felt that Chiang had deliberately embarrassed him.

In December 1948, Li and Cheng Qian urged peace talks with the Communists. Late that month, after two meetings, Chiang and Li agreed that Chiang would step aside so that the government could open negotiations, that Li would exercise the powers of the president and announce a peace policy, and that the Executive Yuan would conduct the talks.

=== Acting president ===
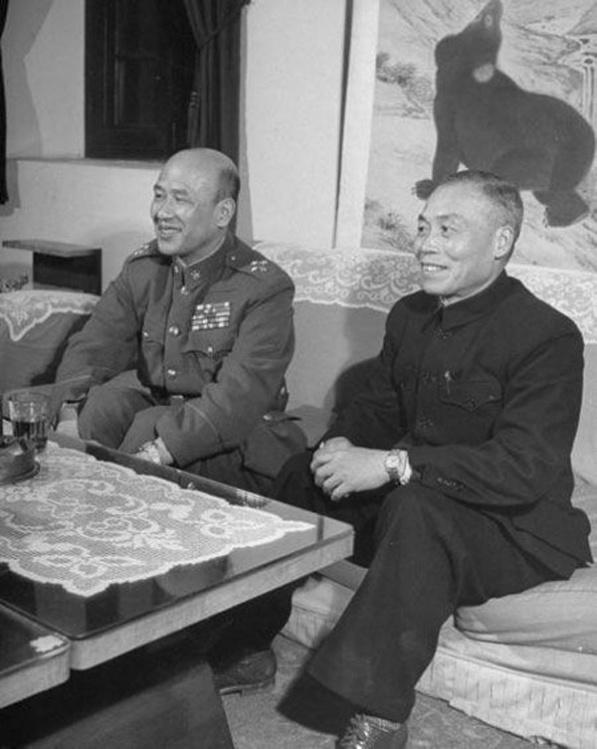
Bai Chongxi and Li Zongren in 1948

On 19 January 1949, Chiang told Li that he would retire. He stepped down on 21 January, as a response to several serious Communist victories in northern China, but he did not formally resign the presidency and remained the leader of the Kuomintang. The same day, Li announced that he would exercise the powers of the president under Article 49 of the constitution, and he declared his willingness to begin talks on the basis of Mao Zedong's eight conditions. He then revoked the general mobilization order, suspended martial law, converted the bandit suppression headquarters into military and political administrations and ordered the release of political prisoners.

After the resignation of Chiang from the presidency, Mao momentarily halted attacks against Kuomintang territories, attempting to negotiate a KMT surrender. Mao's Eight Points, the conditions that he demanded for an end to the civil war, were:

1. Punish all war criminals (Chiang Kai-shek was considered "number one")
2. Abolish the invalid 1947 constitution;
3. Abolish the KMT legal system;
4. Reorganize the Nationalist armies;
5. Confiscate all bureaucratic capital;
6. Reform the land-tenure system;
7. Abolish all treasonous treaties; and,
8. Convene a full Political Consultative Conference to form a democratic coalition government.

Recognizing that agreeing to these points would effectively surrender control of China to the CPC, Li attempted to negotiate milder conditions that might have led to an end to the civil war, but in vain. In April 1949, when the Communists recognized that Li was unlikely to accept their conditions, they offered Li an ultimatum to accept within five days. When he refused, the Communists resumed their campaign.

Li's attempts to negotiate with the Communists were interpreted by some in the KMT as "pacifist attacks", and increased tensions between Li and Chiang (whose relationship was already strained). On 24 January 1949, Li directed the premier, Sun Fo, to carry out seven peace measures. The measures were:

1. Convert the "bandit pacification commands" into military and political administrations
2. Lift martial law, except near the front lines until both sides ordered a halt to fighting
3. Abolish the anti-communist special commando units
4. Release political prisoners
5. Reopen newspapers and magazines closed during the campaign against the Communists
6. Abolish the special criminal courts and their regulations
7. End the activities of the secret police and the arrest of civilians without due process

The Executive Yuan refused to lift martial law, arguing that violations of martial law were not political offences. Li's attempts to carry out his policies faced varying degrees of opposition from Chiang's supporters, and were generally unsuccessful. On 27 January 1949, he telegraphed Mao, urging him to name negotiators and a venue for talks. The same day, his and Bai Chongxi's personal envoys, Liu Zhonghua and Huang Qihan, conveyed a secret message to Ye Jianying in Beiping. Because Li was not a member of the party's Central Standing Committee and was on poor terms with Sun Fo, his relations with the party deteriorated, leading to disputes between the presidential office and the Executive Yuan and between the party and the government.

In February 1949, Sun Fo moved the Executive Yuan from Nanjing to Guangzhou. After Li visited Guangzhou, Sun agreed to return to Nanjing, but he resigned in March, and on 12 March the Legislative Yuan approved Li's nomination of He Yingqin as premier. On 17 February, Li ordered the governor of the Central Bank, Liu Gongyun, not to move the bank's gold reserves elsewhere. Chiang especially antagonized Li by taking possession of (and moving to Taiwan) US$200 million of gold and US dollars belonging to the central government that Li desperately needed to cover the government's soaring expenses. On 24 March, Li named a peace delegation led by Zhang Zhizhong, and in April the delegation negotiated with Zhou Enlai in Beiping, who insisted on Mao's eight conditions as the basis for any settlement.

On 20 April 1949, Li and He Yingqin rejected the draft Domestic Peace Agreement, arguing that it amounted to a conqueror's terms for the conquered and was in effect an ultimatum, and they called for an immediate temporary ceasefire. When the Communists captured the Nationalist capital of Nanjing on 23 April 1949, Li flew to Guilin. On arriving there, he said that he would not allow Guangxi to be ruined and that he would not go to Guangzhou. He refused to accompany the central government as it fled to Guangdong, instead expressing his dissatisfaction with Chiang by retiring to Guangxi.

On 30 April 1949, the American minister-counselor, Lewis Clark, met Li in Guilin, and according to Chinese accounts he urged Li to form a government in Guangzhou that was clearly separate from Chiang, saying that the United States would be glad to aid a "third force". Clark reported to Washington that Li would retire to Guangxi unless he obtained full authority and the removal of Chiang abroad. Former warlord Yan Xishan, who had fled to Nanjing only one month before, quickly inserted himself into the rivalry, attempting to have Li and Chiang reconcile their differences in the effort to resist the Communists. At Chiang's request Yan visited Li in order to convince Li not to withdraw from public life. Yan broke down in tears while talking of the loss of his home province of Shanxi to the Communists, and warned Li that the Nationalist cause was doomed unless Li went to Guangdong. Li agreed to return under the condition that Chiang surrender most of the gold and US dollars in his possession that belonged to the central government, and that Chiang stop overriding Li's authority. On 6 May, Yan told Clark that Li still refused to come to Guangzhou until he was assured a free hand in running the government, and that Chiang wanted to defend the coast while Li favored withdrawal into the interior. After Yan communicated these demands and Chiang agreed to comply with them, Li returned to Guangzhou on 8 May 1949.

In Guangdong, Li attempted to create a new government composed of both Chiang supporters and those opposed to Chiang. Li's first choice of premier was Ju Zheng, a veteran member of the Kuomintang who had been virtually driven into exile due to his strong opposition to Chiang. On 1 June 1949, the Legislative Yuan rejected Ju by one vote, and on 2 June the party's Central Political Council approved Li's nomination of Yan Xishan instead. By this time Yan was well known for his adaptability, and Chiang welcomed his appointment.

Conflict between Chiang and Li persisted. Although he had agreed to do so as a prerequisite of Li's return, Chiang refused to surrender more than a fraction of the wealth that he had sent to Taiwan. Without being backed by gold or foreign currency, the money issued by Li and Yan quickly declined in value until it became virtually worthless. In June 1949, the KMT created an Extraordinary Committee as its highest decision-making body, with Chiang, Li, Sun Fo, Ju Zheng, Yu Youren, He Yingqin and Yan Xishan among its twelve members. According to the historian Angelina Chin, after discussions with the American consul, Li set up a third-force organization in Hong Kong, the Grand Alliance for Freedom and Democracy, on 15 August 1949.

Although he did not hold a formal executive position in the government, Chiang continued to issue orders to the army, and many officers continued to obey Chiang rather than Li. The inability of Li to coordinate KMT military forces led him to put into effect a plan of defense that he had contemplated as early as 1948. Instead of attempting to defend all of southern China, Li ordered what remained of the Nationalist armies to withdraw to Guangxi and Guangdong, hoping that he could concentrate all available defenses on this smaller, and more easily defensible, area. The object of this strategy was to maintain a foothold in mainland China in the hope that the United States would eventually be compelled to enter the war in China on the Nationalist side.

Chiang opposed Li's plan of defense because it would have placed most of the troops still loyal to Chiang under the control of Li and Chiang's other opponents in the central government. To overcome Chiang's intransigence Li began ousting Chiang's supporters within the central government. Yan Xishan continued in his attempts to work with both sides, creating the impression among Li's supporters that he was a "stooge" of Chiang, while those who supported Chiang began to bitterly resent Yan for his willingness to work with Li. Because of the rivalry between Chiang and Li, Chiang refused to allow Nationalist troops loyal to him to aid in the defense of Guangxi and Guangdong, with the result that Communist forces occupied Guangdong in October 1949. On 13 October 1949, Li left Guangzhou for Guilin as Nationalist troops withdrew from the city.

=== Exile ===
After Guangdong fell to the Communists, Chiang relocated the government to Chongqing. When the government withdrew from Chongqing in November 1949, Li did not accompany it, and on 20 November, citing his need for medical treatment, he flew from Nanning to Hong Kong. On 5 December 1949, he left Hong Kong for the United States with his wife and staff, and in New York City he was treated for his chronic duodenum illness at the Hospital of Columbia University. Li visited the President of the United States, Harry S. Truman, and denounced Chiang as a "dictator" and a "usurper." Li vowed that he would "return to crush" Chiang's movements once he returned to China. After arriving in the United States, he initially organized a "third force" opposed to the government in Taipei.

The Kuomintang defenses continued to fall apart. General Hu Zongnan ignored Li's orders, and the Muslim General Ma Hongkui was furious at this. Ma Hongkui sent a telegram to Li to submit his resignation from all positions he held. Ma Hongkui then fled to Taiwan, and his cousin Ma Hongbin took charge of his positions.

In November 1949, Chongqing fell too, and Chiang relocated his government to Chengdu, before finally moving to Taipei in December 1949. In January and February 1950, the Control Yuan and members of the KMT's Central Extraordinary Committee urged Li to return to Taiwan, but he declined on grounds of ill health, and he argued that under the constitution the premier should act as president until the National Assembly elected a new president. On 1 March 1950, Chiang formally resumed the presidency in Taipei. Li denounced the move as unconstitutional, arguing that he had been exercising the powers of the presidency rather than acting for Chiang personally, and that Chiang had become a private citizen after stepping down. On 2 March 1950, Truman received Li for lunch, and while Truman told reporters that he had invited Li as China's president, the State Department stated that evening that the United States recognized Chiang as the head of the Chinese government.

In January 1952, Chiang commanded the Control Yuan, now in Taiwan, to impeach Li in the "Case of Li Zongren's Failure to carry out Duties due to Illegal Conduct", and the National Assembly officially relieved Li of the position as vice-president on 10 March 1954. In August 1955, Li published a "Proposal on the Taiwan Question", in which he stated that Taiwan was part of China and argued that proposals for a United Nations trusteeship, neutralization or "two Chinas" would separate Taiwan from China.

=== Return to mainland China ===
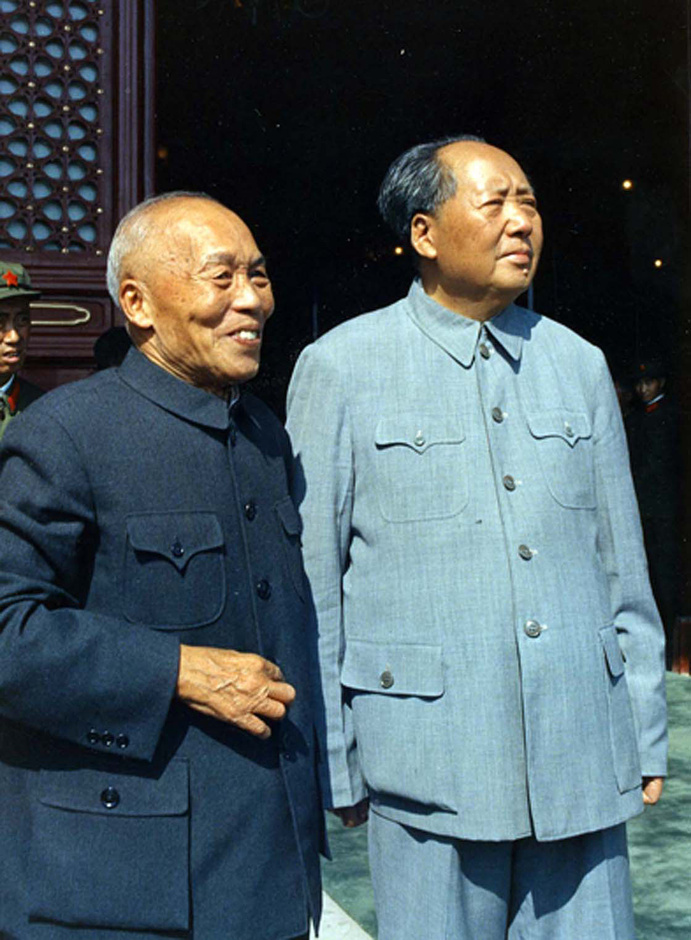
Li Zongren and Mao Zedong on 1 October 1966, during the national day celebration

In May 1955, Li's associate Cheng Siyuan visited Beijing and told the deputy foreign minister, Li Kenong, that Li wished to return, and Li Kenong recommended to Zhou Enlai that Li be won over. In November 1963, Cheng relayed to Li Zhou's conditions that he break with the United States and stay out of the Taiwan question, the "third force" movement and Sino-American relations, and Li accepted them. In June 1965, Cheng travelled to Switzerland to meet Li.

Li remained in exile until 20 July 1965, when he caused a sensation by returning to Communist-held China with the support of Zhou Enlai. Zhou, Peng Zhen, He Long, Guo Moruo and other officials met Li and his wife, Guo Dejie, at the airport in Beijing, where he read a statement. In the statement, which was published in the People's Daily, he said that he still regretted his failure to accept the peace agreement in 1949 and his later involvement in the "third force" movement. His return to China was used as propaganda by the Communist government to encourage other KMT members to return to the mainland, regardless of their politics.

In late July 1965, Mao received Li and his wife, welcomed their return and suggested that Li travel around the country. According to an account in the People's Digest, Mao joked that Li had "boarded a pirate ship by mistake" and told him that Taiwan would one day return to China. At a press conference on 26 September 1965, Li said that in 1955 members of the American Republican Party had approached him about replacing Chiang, and that he would do everything he could to help if Chiang wished to settle the Taiwan question peacefully.

Guo Dejie died of breast cancer in Beijing on 21 March 1966. On 25 July 1966, Li married Hu Yousong, a nurse. During the Cultural Revolution, Zhou ordered that Red Guards must not enter Li's home to hold struggle sessions, and on 15 September 1966 he arranged for Li to be protected at the 301 Hospital. On 1 October 1966, Mao met Li on the Tiananmen rostrum during the National Day celebrations and told him that the democratic parties must not be abolished. Li's health declined from August 1968, and he was diagnosed with duodenal cancer. He died of the disease in Beijing at midnight on 30 January 1969, at the age of 78. On 1 February 1969, Zhou presided over the ceremony at which his ashes were placed in the Babaoshan Revolutionary Cemetery, and Zhou described Li's last letter, in which Li wrote that his return in 1965 had been the right path, as a "historical document".

== Legacy ==
According to a Chinese account, after the Xi'an Incident Mao told Li's envoy Liu Zhongrong that Li was "a capable man", since many things that could not be achieved under Chiang had been accomplished in Guangxi. A 2000 volume of the CPPCC's Selected Historical Materials credits Li with unifying Guangxi, helping to lay the foundations for the Northern Expedition, cooperating with the Communists against Japan and fighting at Tai'erzhuang. The same work states that his long-standing anti-communism made him one of the principal war criminals wanted by the People's Liberation Army.

== Personal life ==
Over the course of his career, Li gained a reputation as an ardent militarist and confirmed anti-intellectual, but with a rugged sense of integrity. He was known for disliking music. Like many Chinese leaders in the 1930s, Li was once an admirer of European Fascism, seeing it as a solution to the problems of a once proud nation humbled by internal dissension and external weakness. His ethical attitudes were self-consciously drawn from Confucianism. After his falling out with Chiang Kai-shek in 1929, Li often expressed himself in terms of frustrated patriotism. Li was an admirer of the British historian Edward Gibbon and his monumental historical work, The Decline and Fall of the Roman Empire.

Li and his close staff member, the Muslim General Bai Chongxi, were powerful partners in politics and military affairs. They were once given the nickname Li Bai, after the famous poet.

In 1911, Li married Li Xiuwen, who had been born in 1891, and they had a son, Li Youlin. Li Xiuwen later dictated a memoir, My Life with Li Zongren, and she died in 1992 at the age of 102. Li met Guo Dejie in 1922, when he was stationed at Guiping, and they married in 1925. Because she had no children of her own, Guo adopted a son, Li Zhisheng, in 1937. She led a women's propaganda unit during the Northern Expedition and directed women's work in the Fifth War Zone during the war with Japan, and in 1948 she became a delegate to the National Assembly. She went to the United States with Li in 1949, returned with him to mainland China in 1965 and died of breast cancer in Beijing in 1966. In 1966, Li married Hu Yousong, a 27-year-old nurse at Beijing's Jishuitan Hospital. The magazine Xinwen Tiandi described her as an illegitimate daughter of the actress Hu Die. After Li's death, she changed her name to Wang Xi, and she remarried in the early 1980s, although the marriage soon ended in divorce. She later became a lay Buddhist, and she died in 2008.

Li Zongren's nephew Alan Lee has run a kung fu school in New York City since 1967. A set of Samurai swords and daggers from the Edo period given to Li Zongren as a "gift of truce between enemies who are now friends" by either Seishirō Itagaki or Rensuke Isogai were passed on to Alan Lee as part of the family legacy.

Li co-wrote Memoirs of Li Zongren with historian Tong Tekong as an oral history project with Columbia University. Li's memoir is notable for its vehement criticism of Chiang Kai-shek and its analysis of Japan's strategic failure to conquer China.

== Awards and honors ==
=== National ===
- Order of Blue Sky and White Sun (1946)
- First Class of the Order of the Cloud and Banner (1936)
- Order of Loyalty and Diligence
- Order of Cosmic Diagram (1945)
- Gancheng Badge First Class, Grade A
- Medal of the Armed Forces, A-1
- Medal of Victory in the War of Resistance (1946)
- War Memorial Medal (1946)
- Commemorative Medal for the 10th Anniversary of the Oath-Taking Ceremony of the Northern Expedition of the National Revolutionary Army (1936)

=== Foreign ===
- Grand Officer of the Legion of Honour (France)
- Medal of Freedom with gold palm (United States)

== In popular culture ==
Li Zongren was portrayed by Wang Xueqi in the 2009 movie The Founding of a Republic.

== See also ==
- Second Sino-Japanese War
- National Revolutionary Army
- Military of the Republic of China
- History of the Republic of China

== Sources ==
- Barnouin, Barbara and Yu Changgen. Zhou Enlai: A Political Life. Hong Kong: Chinese University of Hong Kong, 2006. ISBN 962-996-280-2. Retrieved at <Zhou Enlai: A Political Life> on 12 March 2011.
- Bonavia, David. China's Warlords. New York: Oxford University Press. 1995. ISBN 0-19-586179-5
- Gillin, Donald G. "Portrait of a Warlord: Yen Hsi-shan in Shansi Province, 1911-1930." The Journal of Asian Studies. Vol. 19, No. 3, May 1960. Retrieved at: <The Journal of Asian Studies, Vol. 19, No. 3 (May, 1960), pp. 289-306> on 23 February 2011
- Gillin, Donald G. Warlord: Yen Hsi-shan in Shansi Province 1911–1949. Princeton, New Jersey: Princeton University Press. 1967.
- Li Zongren, Li Tsung-jen, Tong Te-kong. The memoirs of Li Tsung-jen. Boulder, Colo.: Westview Press. 1979. ISBN 0-89158-343-2.
- Spence, Jonathan D. The Search for Modern China, W.W. Norton and Company. 1999. ISBN 0-393-97351-4.
- "CHINA: Return of the Gimo". TIME Magazine. Monday, 13 March 1950. Retrieved at <CHINA: Return of the Gimo – TIME> on 16 May 2011.
- Jeffrey G. Barlow, THE ZHUANG: ETHNOGENESIS, December 12, 2005 COPYRIGHT, JEFFREY G. BARLOW, Department of History, Pacific University, 2043 College Way, Forest Grove, Oregon, 97116, EMAIL barlowj@pacificu.edu
  - Chapter 19: The Zhuang and the 1911 Revolution
  - Chapter 20: The Zhuang and the Development of the Modern Economy in Guangxi

Political offices
Preceded by Office created	Vice President of the Republic of China; 1948–1954	Succeeded by Chen Cheng
Preceded by Chiang Kai-shek	President of the Republic of China; Acting; 1949–1950	Succeeded by Chiang Kai-shek
