= New Guangxi clique =

Historical warlord clique in China

New Guangxi Clique
- Flag
- Anthem: "Three Principles of the People"
- Status: Semi-autonomous province of the Republic of China (1911–1949)
- Capital: Nanning (1926–1939), (1942–1944), (1946–1950)
- Largest city: Nanning
- Recognized languages: Chinese, Yue, Cantonese
- Government: Authoritarian state
- History
  - Established: 8 April 1924
  - Chinese Civil War: 8 January 1950

Population
  - Estimate: 24,500,000
- Today part of: China

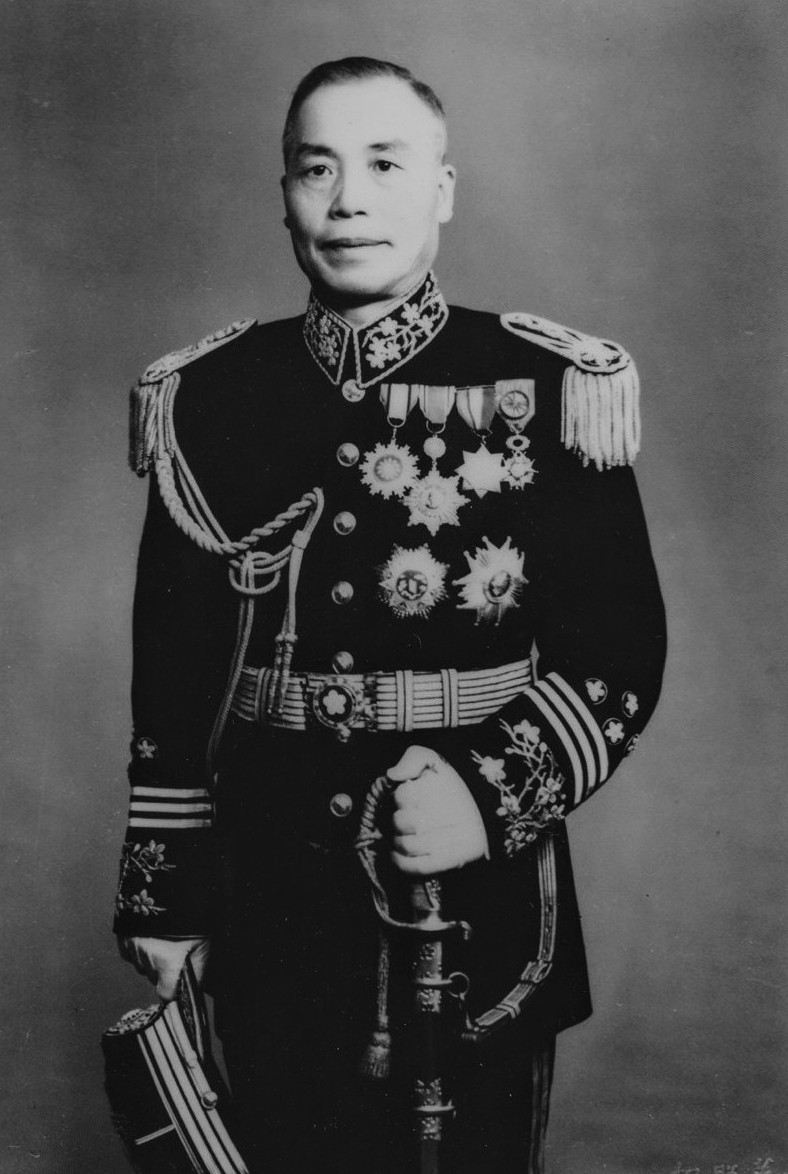
Li Zongren, Commander in Chief of the New Guangxi Clique

The New Guangxi clique (Chinese: 新桂系; pinyin: Xīn Guì Xì), led by Li Zongren, Huang Shaohong, and Bai Chongxi, was a warlord clique during the Republic of China. After the founding of the Republic, Guangxi served as the base for the Old Guangxi clique, one of the most powerful warlord cliques of China. In the early 1920s, the Guangdong–Guangxi War saw the pro-Kuomintang New Guangxi clique replace the Old clique.

== Lu Rongting and the Yue-Gui Wars ==
In 1920, Chen Jiongming drove Lu Rongting and the Old Guangxi clique out of Guangdong in the First Yue-Gui War. In 1921, Chen pushed into Guangxi, starting the Second Yue-Gui War, forcing Lu to step down in July 1921. By August, Chen had occupied Nanning and the rest of Guangxi, and continued to do so until April 1922. Their occupation was largely nominal because armed bands of Guangxi loyalists began to gather under local commanders, calling themselves the Self-Government Army. Sun Yat-sen and Chen soon split over the continuation of the Northern Expedition. Chen, however, aspired merely to be the warlord of Guangdong and after the Zhili Clique in Beijing recognized his power in the south, he abandoned Sun. By May 1922, the Cantonese forces had evacuated Guangxi leaving a power vacuum.

== Aftermath of the Yue-Gui Wars ==
Lu Rongting could construct a political and military machine from the forces that composed the Self-Government Armies, by calling on friends, family, and members of the Zhuang ethnicity, but the lack of such a leader led to a rapid collapse into localism, which occurred as the Guangdong forces withdrew. There was intense fighting to re-occupy territory or to attempt to strip the retreating forces of their supplies and munitions.

With the support of Wu Peifu and the Zhili Clique, Lu slipped back into Guangxi in 1923 and began to try to rebuild his coalition. He soon had control over the south with its important pool of Zhuang manpower, but the situation had changed and his political organization could not be rebuilt. Among the younger men who had been trained in military schools after the 1911 Revolution, there was a new appreciation for modern tactics, weapons, and political means. In the confused power struggles following the Yue-Gui Wars, these local military men began to carve out territory in Guangxi and dominate it.

In the southwest there were opium trails from Yunnan and Guizhou that ran through Baise and then down the river to Nanning. From there, opium usually went out through Wuzhou, where the trade was financed. During the Yue-Gui wars, Huang Shaohong, then the commander of the Model Battalion of the 1st Guangxi Division, and Bai Chongxi, his former deputy, attempted to stay neutral and relocated to Baise. Huang eventually got control of Baise, and the opium trade. Later he expanded his control to Wuzhou, thus controlling the routes through which opium both entered and left Guangxi. With his opium revenue Bai was able to build a well-equipped and trained force.

During the Yue-Gui Wars, Li Zongren had accompanied Lu and Lin Hu into Guangdong and led the rear guard when the Old Guangxi Clique forces retreated before Chen Jiongming's attack. During the campaign, Li's battalion was reduced to about one thousand men and "sank into the grasses." But Li, intending to become more than a bandit, began building a personal military machine of professional units of soldiers. These were to be the equal of any force in China and more than a match for any number of bandits or Zhuang irregulars that Lu drew on in his war to re-establish his power in Guangxi. Li joined the Kuomintang in 1923, when he already controlled a considerable numbers of troops in northern Guangxi and wiped out the local bandits, warlords, and remnant forces of the Old Guangxi clique in the north.

== New Guangxi clique takes power ==
By the spring of 1924, Huang Shaohong, Bai Chongxi, and Li Zongren, formed the New Guangxi clique and had created the well equipped Guangxi Pacification Army. Li was the Commander in Chief, Huang the deputy Commander, and Bai the Chief-of-Staff. By August they had defeated and driven the former ruler Lu Rongting and other contenders out of the province. Li was military governor of Guangxi from 1924–25, and from 1925 to 1949.

The coalition's efforts brought Guangxi under the jurisdiction of the Republic of China. Li was the military governor of Guangxi from 1924–25, Huang became the civil governor of Guangxi from 1924 to 1929, and Guangxi remained under Li's influence until 1949. The New Guangxi clique made attempts at modernising between 1926 and 1927, when the Guangxi clique controlled Guangxi and much of Guangdong, Hunan, and Hubei. The New Guangxi clique was much more active in modernizing than Lu Rongting had been. They founded the University of Guangxi in Nanning, built over five thousand kilometers of roads and extended electrification of the area. Li also authorized the funding of middle class farmers to produce at full capacity, exporting additional rice to neighboring Guangdong province. Guangxi also retained lots of heavy industry in major urban centers, but in many cases lacked the expertise or workers to operate it, only operating around 96 factories for the entire province. Guangxi was also spared from any rampant corruption unlike the rest of China, also retaining a very stable economy.

However, because the clique had to constantly be mobilized for war, first against the Guangdong warlords, then later against the Japanese, the tax burden which they levied was far heavier than that of Lu, however as time passed, and with the additional passing of economic reforms in the province the amount of taxes decreased. The New Guangxi Clique also taxed the opium trade. As was later true for Chiang Kai-shek's government, the taxes were collected via opium suppression offices, ostensibly created to destroy the trade. In 1932 opium income amounted to fifty million dollars, the largest source of income in the provincial budget. Despite the heavy taxation, the New Guangxi Clique was extremely popular, and widely accepted by the citizens of the province. A series of moderately scaled land, and economic reform, and minimal amounts of deregulation were also experimented with in select counties and regions.

== New Guangxi Clique and the Northern Expedition ==
During the Northern Expedition, Bai Chongxi was the Chief of Staff of the National Revolutionary Army and led the Eastern Route Army which conquered Hangzhou and Shanghai in 1927. As garrison commander of Shanghai, Bai also took part in the purge of Communists in the National Revolutionary Army and of the labour unions in Shanghai. Li Zongren was the general of the Seventh Army in the Northern Expedition. Li went on to be the commanding general of the Seventh Army in the Northern Expedition and captured Wuhan in 1927. Li was then appointed commander of the Fourth Army Group, composed of the Guangxi Army and other provincial forces amounting to 16 corps and six independent divisions. In April 1928, Li and Bai, who was credited with many victories over the northern warlords, led the Fourth Army group to advance on Beijing, capturing Handan, Baoding, and Shijiazhuang, by June 1. Zhang Zuolin withdrew from Beijing on June 3, and Li's army seized Beijing. Bai commanded the forward units which first entered Beijing and Tianjin.

== New Guangxi clique and Chiang Kai-shek ==
At the end of the Northern Expedition, Chiang Kai-shek began to agitate to reorganize the army, the fact that it would alter the existing territorial influences among the Cliques in the party quickly aggravated the relationships between the central government and the regional powers. Li Zongren, Bai Chongxi and Huang Shaohong of the Guangxi Clique were the first to break off relations with Chiang in March 1929, which started the confrontation that lead to the Central Plains War. Chiang Kai-shek defeated the Clique in 1929. Following defeat in that civil war, Guangxi allied with Chen Jitang after he became chairman of the government of Guangdong in 1931, and turned against Chiang Kai-shek. Another civil war would have broken out if there had been no September 18 Incident, which prompted all sides to unite against the Empire of Japan. As a result, from 1930 to 1936, the Clique organized the reconstruction of Guangxi, which became a "model" province with a progressive administration. As a result, Guangxi was able to supply large numbers of troops in the war effort against Japan in the Second Sino-Japanese War.

== World War II ==
Upon the Marco Polo Bridge Incident, Guangxi was only minorly affected. It would not be until 1939 until fighting took place in Guangxi, however this did not stop Guangxi from contributing to the war effort in other regions. Of the millions of troops mobilized and deployed from all around China, Guangxi contributed around 900,000 of them, with many being militiamen. In November of 1939, the IJA landed in southern Guangxi and captured Nanning, cutting off Chongqing from the southern coast. This would force Chongqing to rely on the Burma Road and the Hump for Allied supplies. Savage fighting ensued in Guangxi, with the province bearing the brunt of the main fighting that occurred in southern China.

As the war soon progressed into the 1940s, the IJA withdrew entirely from Guangxi to reinforce garrisons in Indochina for later operations in southwest China. It would not be until Operation Ichi Go that Guangxi saw fighting on an intense scale again. During Ichi Go, many airfields within Guangxi were destroyed by the Japanese in retaliation for the air attacks conducted from China. In the closing days of World War 2, Guangxi was recaptured by the Chinese during the Second Guangxi Campaign. After World War 2, a state of rebuilding was declared by Li Zongren, as a majority of the province had been ravaged by the chaotic fighting in the early and later days of the war.

== See also ==
- Warlord Era
- List of Warlords

== Sources ==
- Lary, Diana. (1974). Region and nation: the Kwangsi clique in Chinese politics, 1925–1937. London, Cambridge University Press ISBN 0521202043.
- The Kwangsi Way in Kuomintang China, 1931–1939
- Mobilization and Reconstruction in Kwangsi Province, 1931–1939
- 陈贤庆(Chen Xianqing), 民国军阀派系谈 (The Republic of China warlord cliques discussed), 2007 revised edition
- Memoirs of Li Tsung-jen (Li Zongren)
