= Chen Bingkun =

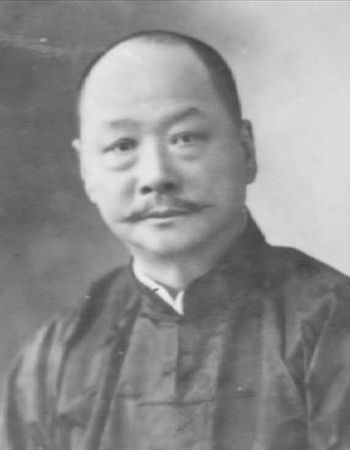
Chen Bingkun.

Chen Bingkun, (simplified Chinese: 陈炳焜; traditional Chinese: 陳炳焜; pinyin: Chén Bǐngkūn),(1868 – September 1927) was born in 1868 in Liujiang, Guangxi, China. A general in the late Qing Period, he was commander of the 1st Division of the Guangxi Provincial Army. As a supporter of the Old Guangxi Clique he became the military governor of Guangxi from 1916-17, civil governor of Guangxi in 1916 and military governor of Guangdong in 1917. With Lu Rongting he opposed the southern government led by Sun Yat-sen. In 1920 Chen Jiongming, acting for Sun Yat-sen, pushed them out of Guangdong in the First Ao-Gui War. In 1921 he invaded Guangxi, igniting the Second Ao-Gui War. Lu sent two wings of his army, one led by Tan Haoming and the other under Shen Hongying, into Guangdong where they drove back the Cantonese and occupied Qinzhou and Lianzhou. However, the center at Wuzhou, commanded by Chen Binghun, collapsed and Chen Jiongming drove up the rivers while allies came in from the north, forcing Lu Rongting to step down in July 1921. By August Chen had occupied Nanning, defeating the Old Guangxi clique and Chen Binghun. Chen died in September 1927.

== Sources ==
- Chen Bingkun
- THE ZHUANG AND THE 1911 REVOLUTION
