= Tong Tekong =

Chinese historian (1920–2009)

Tekong Tong
- Born: 23 August 1920; Anhui, Republic of China
- Died: 26 October 2009 (aged 89); San Francisco, California, United States of America
- Education: Nanjing University; Columbia University
- Occupations: Professor at the Columbia University and City University of New York
- Notable work: The final seventy years of Qing Dynasty; Memoir of Li Zongren; Memoir of Wellington Koo; Oral Autography of Hu Shih; Oral History by Zhang Xueliang
- Spouse: Wu Zhaowen

Tong Tekong (Chinese: 唐德剛; pinyin: Táng Dégāng; 23 August 1920 in Anhui province, China - 26 October 2009) was a historian, academic and an author. Tong graduated in Nanjing University majoring in history, and finished his PhD at Columbia University, and later taught Chinese history in Columbia University. Tong also worked as professor in City University of New York for 20 years, and retired in 1991.

== Selected works ==
- US Diplomacy in China, 1844-1860 (1964)
- The Memoirs of V. K. Wellington Koo (1977)
- The Memoirs of Hu Shih (1977)
- The Memoirs of Li Tsung-jen (1979)
- The Third Americans: A Select Bibliography on Asians in America with Annotations (1980)
- An Autobiography: As Told by Hu Shih (1980)
- Lectures on American History (1982)
- Random Memories of Hu Shih (1985)
