= Lu Rongting =

Chinese warlord (1858–1928)

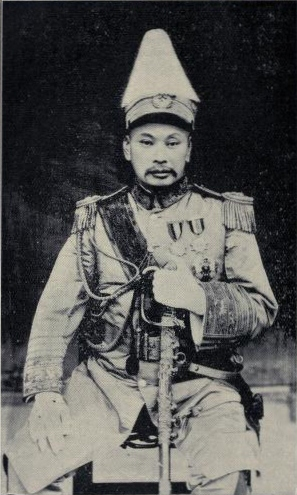
- Lu in 1925

Head of the Old Guangxi Clique
- In office July 1911 – October 1924
- Preceded by: Post Established
- Succeeded by: Li Zongren New Guangxi Clique

Personal details
- Born: Lu Yasong (陸亞宋); 19 September 1858 Wuming, Guangxi, Qing dynasty
- Died: 6 November 1928 (aged 70) Shanghai
- Awards: Order of Rank and Merit; Order of Wen-Hu

Military service
- Allegiance: Qing dynasty (1884–1911) (Republic of China (1912–1949)) Republic of China (1911–1924); Old Guangxi Clique (1911–1924)
- Rank: Marshal
- Battles/wars: National Protection War, Constitutional Protection Movement, Guangdong–Guangxi War

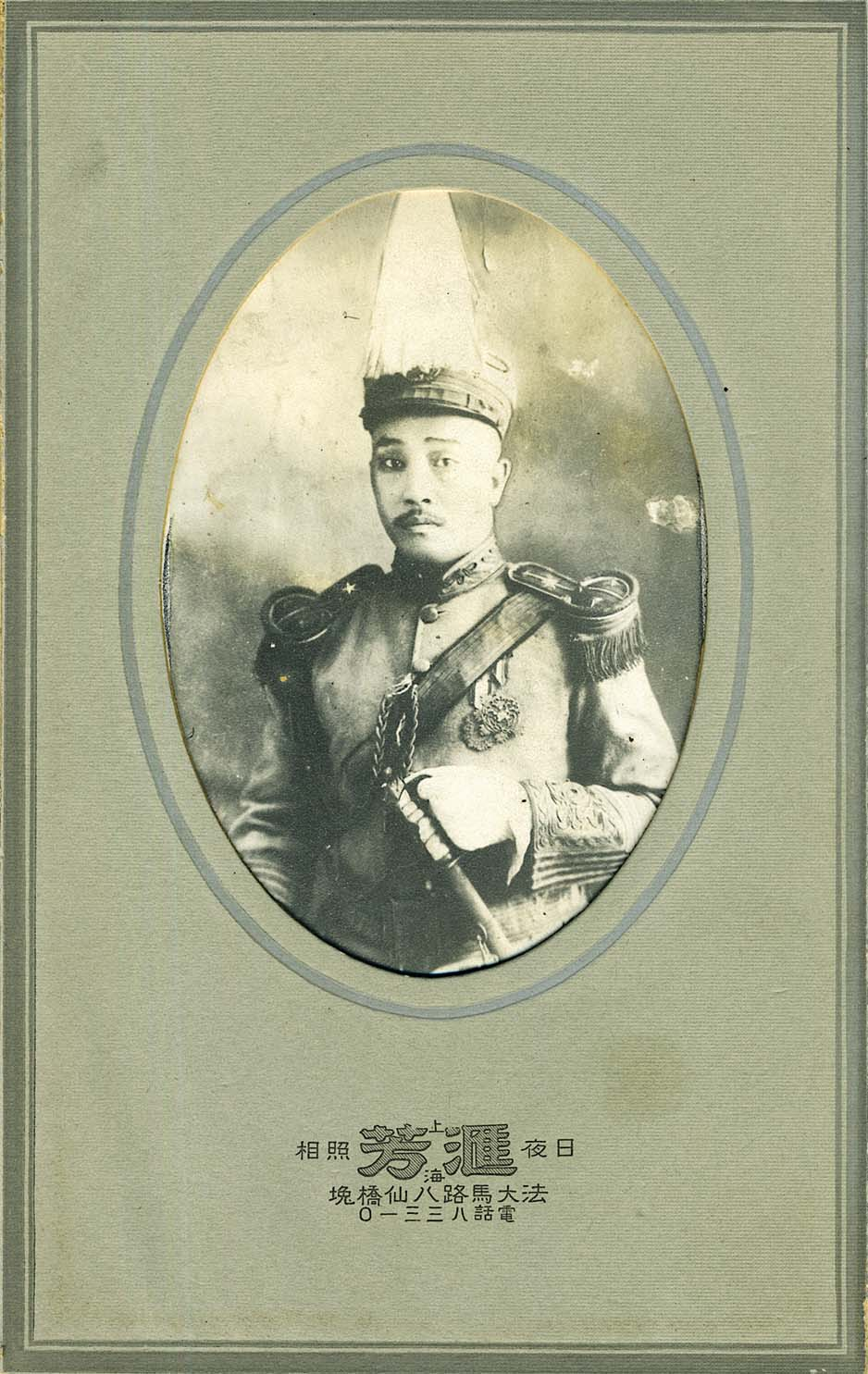
Lu Rongting

Lu Rongting (simplified Chinese: 陆荣廷; traditional Chinese: 陸榮廷; pinyin: Lù Róngtíng; September 19, 1858 – November 6, 1928), also romanized as Lu Yung-ting, Luk Yung-ting and Lu Jung-t'ing, was the leader of the Guangxi Clique and a prominent military and political figure of the Zhuang ethnic group from Wuming, Guangxi, who was active during the late Qing and early Republican periods. His distinguished career included a series of key posts, such as Military Governor of Guangxi, Military Governor of Guangdong, Inspector-General of Liangguang (Guangdong and Guangxi), and Marshal of the Guangdong Military Government.

March 15, 1916 marked a crucial turning point for the anti-monarchist movement. Lu's bold actions breathed new life into the National Protection Army and prompted several provinces to break away from Yuan, ultimately leading to the downfall of the short-lived Hongxian Empire. At a time when pro-republican forces in Yunnan and Guizhou were facing serious setbacks, Lu's resistance proved vital in preserving the Republic of China. He quickly arrested Yuan loyalist Long Jiguang and brought stability to the southern provinces, which significantly boosted his national profile. What truly set Lu apart, however, was his character. He was widely respected for his integrity and patriotism, consistently refusing bribes and titles offered by Yuan. Contemporaries viewed him as a cornerstone of the Republic, crediting him with protecting China's republican ideals through both his unwavering principles and decisive political action.

== Life ==
=== Late Qing Era ===
Lu Rongting came from a peasant family and joined secret societies (Hui Dang) during his youth in order to make a living. He surrendered to the Qing army at Shuikou Pass in 1882 and joined the local chapter of the Tiandihui. He became a regular in the Qing army after the outbreak of the Sino-French War in 1884. After the end of the war, he was dismissed and he subsequently returned to banditry. His main efforts were focused on harassing the French army, which made him popular among the locals.

In 1894, Lu Rongting was co-opted (zhao'an) into the army of Guangxi's Provincial military commander (广西提督) Su Yuanchun (苏元春) and received a Guandai (管带). After this he was relegated to the regular Qing army. Between 1903 and 1905 he actively participated in the suppression of anti-Qing revolutionaries and massive secret society uprisings in Guangxi. In the fall of 1904 Viceroy of Liangguang Cen Chunxuan appointed him commander of the 4000-man Guangxi Border Guards (Rongziying 荣字营) unit. This army would later form the core of the Old Guangxi clique, a faction led by Lu.

In December 1907 Long Jiguang and Lu Rongting led Qing forces in suppressing the Zhennanguan Uprising. The successful suppression of the revolt led by Sun Yat-sen and Huang Xing consequently forced Sun to flee to Singapore, and he did not return to China until the Wuchang Uprising. The Qing court awarded Lu with the Baturu title. With Long Jiguang leaving for the position of Viceroy of Guangdong, Lu was promoted to become the Viceroy of Guangxi.

=== Leader of the Old Guangxi Clique ===
In July 1911, following the Wuchang Uprising, Guangxi Gov. Chen Bingkun proclaimed independence and formed the Guangxi military government. Following the departure of Shen Bingkun and Wang Zhixiang, Lu assumed control over Guangxi province.

On 8 February 1912 President Yuan Shikai formally appointed Lu the governor of Guangxi. In the KMT-initiated "second revolution" in 1913, Lu sided with Yuan Shikai and suppressed the Nationalist revolutionaries in Guangxi.

Soon afterwards Cai E and Tang Jiyao (Yunnan Clique) started the National Protection War and Lu joined them against Yuan's monarchial ambitions (Hongxian emperor). In the process Cen Chunxuan, an enemy of Yuan Shikai, was secretly recruited by Lu. Some scholars have suggested the reason for Lu's sudden change in allegiance was due to his discontent about Yuan's preferential treatment, which prevented him from expanding his influence into Guangdong. Nevertheless, the National Protection War led to the abdication of Yuan Shikai.

Long Jiguang proclaimed Guangdong's independence from Yuan on 6 April 1916. With the death of Yuan Shikai in June, Lu and Li Liejun attacked Long and forced him to retreat to Hainan. In the same year Lu assumed the position of governor of Guangdong province. His control and jurisdiction over both Guangdong and Guangxi was affirmed by new president Li Yuanhong in April 1917.

=== Start of the Warlord Era ===
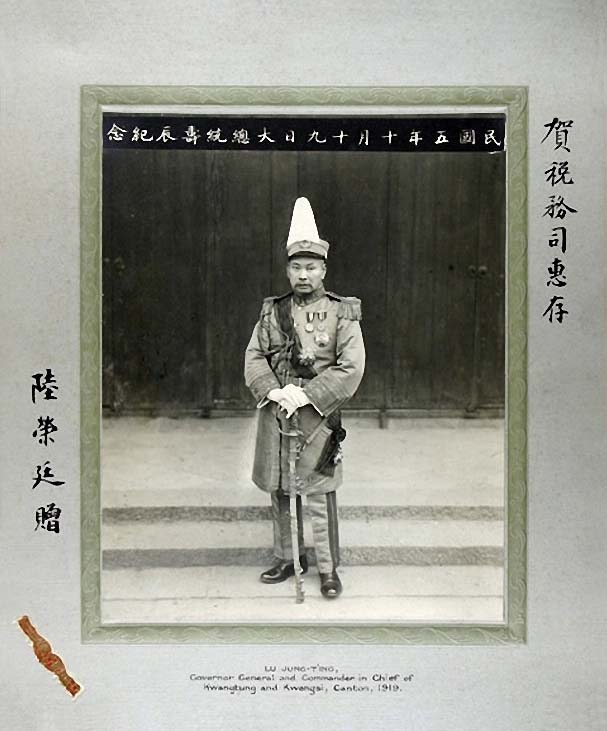
Lu's gift to RFC Hedgeland, dated 19 October 1919. Caption reads: “Lu Jung-T'ing, Governor General and Commander in Chief of Guangdong and Guangxi, Canton”.

Sun Yat-sen initiated the Constitutional Protection Movement in 1917, and Lu played an important role. Under the military reorganization in 1918, Tang Jihao and Lu were appointed joint chiefs. This organization was instrumental in establishing peace between the Beijing government (under the Zhili Clique) and the Constitutional Protection Movement armies.

However, schisms within the movement appeared, with Sun opposing Lu's (Old Guangxi Clique) nuanced stance against the Zhili Clique-led government in Beijing. Furthermore, the people of Guangdong gradually became opposed to Lu's control over the province. By July 1920 Chen Jiongming (with Sun's support) ousted Lu and Cen Chunxuan from Guangdong.

=== Military Comeback ===
After Lu's loss in Guangdong, he gained the support of the Beiyang government in an attempt to recover the province. In June 1921, the second conflict between the Old Guangxi Clique and Guangdong took place. However, due to defections within his own army and the loss of the strategic city of Chongzuo in September, Lu declared his decision to step down from the governorship in Nanning, and he subsequently fled to Shanghai.

Due to the polarization of relations between Chen Jiongming and Sun Yat-sen, Lu was re-appointed to become governor of Guangxi province in 1923 by the Beiyang government. However, he was unable to fully recover his influence over the province due to the formation of the New Guangxi Clique led by Li Zongren and Bai Chongxi.

Within Southern China three forces emerged, the most powerful led by the coalition of Lu and followed by Shen Hongying and the New Guangxi Clique. In 1924 Lu's forces were surrounded by Shen's troops and at the same time were under attack by the New Guangxi Clique. Nanning was lost to the New Guangxi Clique and by August that year Lu had also lost Guilin to Shen. Facing defeat, he fled to Yongzhou, Hunan, and officially announced his defeat and departure from politics on 9 October 1924. On 6 November 1928 he died in Shanghai from illness.

== Family ==
- Father: Lu Yexiu
- Brother-in-law: Tan Haoming
- Son-in-law: Long Yungan (Son of Long Jinguang)
- Son: Lu Yuguang
- Son: Lu Yuxun

== Legend ==
There was a legend saying that Lu has once reached a fortune teller in Guangzhou. However, in order not to let others discover his identity, he dressed up like a poor person. The fortune teller immediately recognized him despite his disguise, and then ridiculed him by telling him that he will have big trouble in the future. Later, he was defeated by other cliques and has fallen from power ever since, which made the fortune teller's prophecy become true. This legend has then become a xiehouyu in Cantonese, meaning that someone is asking for trouble.
