= Western Hubei Operation =

- Part of the Second Sino-Japanese War
Date	March 6–26, 1941 (2 weeks and 6 days)
Location	Western part of Hubei province in the Republic of China
Result	Chinese victory

Belligerents
Republic of China	Empire of Japan

Commanders and leaders
(Republic of China (1912–1949)) Li Zongren	(Empire of Japan) Lt. General Waichiro Sonobe

Strength
River Defense Force: 26th Corps; 32nd Division; 41st Division; 44th Division; 103rd Division	11th Army: 13th Division

Casualties and losses
26th corps : 47 officers and 1,800 soldiers killed 124 officers and 2,699 soldiers wounded	According to the recollection of a veteran of the 19th Mountain Artillery Regiment : numerous infantry casualties with dozens of bodies of the fallen cremated after the battle. 65th Infantry Regiment : 42 killed. 58th Infantry Regiment according to a veteran's recollection : many killed in action. 116th Infantry Regiment : unknown.

The Western Hubei Operation was an engagement between the National Revolutionary Army and Imperial Japanese Army during the Second Sino-Japanese War. Three infantry, one cavalry and an artillery regiment of the 13th Division crossed to the south bank of the Yangtze River near Yichang to attack the Chinese positions there.
