= Guangdong–Guangxi War =

War during the Warlord Era of China

- Part of Warlord Era
Date	1920–1922
Location	South China
Result	Victory for Sun Yat-sen

Belligerents
Old Guangxi clique	Constitutional Protection Junta

Commanders and leaders
Lu Rongting; Tan Haoming; Shen Hongying; Chen Binghun	Sun Yat-sen; Chen Jiongming

Guangdong–Guangxi War
- Traditional Chinese: 粵桂戰爭
- Simplified Chinese: 粵桂战争
Transcriptions
Standard Mandarin
- Hanyu Pinyin: Yuè-Guì Zhànzhēng
Yue: Cantonese
- Jyutping: Jyut^{6}-Gwai^{3} Zin^{3}-zang^{1}

The Guangdong–Guangxi War, or the 1st and 2nd Yue-Gui Wars, occurred between the Kuomintang and the Old Guangxi Clique.

== First Yue-Gui War ==
When Sun Yat-sen, leader of the Chinese Revolutionary Party, attempted to re-establish himself in Guangzhou in 1917, warlord Lu Rongting reluctantly supported him for a few years. After Sun split from the Old Guangxi Clique over allocation of troops, he attempted to strip Cen Chunxuan (a.k.a. Tsen Chun-Hsuan or Sam Sun-Suen), one of Lu's most important allies in Guangdong, of some of his troops, in order to assign them to the more apparently loyal Chen Jiongming, a local Guangdong warlord who had sponsored Sun. Sun Yat-sen then directed Chen Jiongming to attack Lu Rongting and the other Guangxi warlords. In October 1920, Chen captured Guangzhou and drove the Guangxi warlords out of Guangdong.

== Second Yue-Gui War ==
In 1921, Chen hoped to unite the region surrounding Guangdong behind Sun's regime at Guangzhou and pushed into Guangxi itself. Lu sent two armies--one led by his wife's younger brother Tan Haoming, the other under Shen Hongying—against Chen's forces. These drove Chen back and occupied the areas of Qinzhou and Lianzhou. However, Lu's ally Chen Binghun collapsed, losing Wuzhou and allowing Chen Jiongming to drive up the rivers into Guangxi as allies moved in from the north. Lu Rongting was forced to step down in July 1921. By August, Chen had occupied Nanning and the rest of Guangxi.

== Aftermath ==
Although Chen Jiongming and the Guangdong forces occupied Guangxi until April 1922, their occupation was largely nominal. Armed bands of Guangxi loyalists continued to gather under local commanders, calling themselves the Self-Government Army. Sun Yat-sen and Chen Jiongming soon split over plans for the Northern Expedition. By May 1922, Sun Yat-sen's Cantonese forces had evacuated Guangxi, leaving it to Chen. Nevertheless, Sun would return later to reform his National government.

== See also ==
- New Guangxi Clique
