= Lin Hu (warlord) =

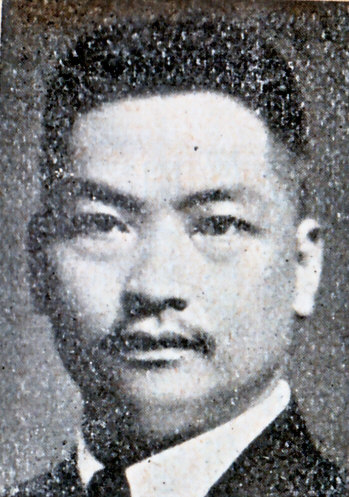
Lin Hu

Lin Hu (Chinese: 林虎; 1887–1960) was a warlord of the Old Guangxi Clique during Republic of China's Warlord Era and military governor of Guangdong province from May 1924 to July 1925.

== Biography ==
=== Early life and career ===
Lin Hu was born in 1887 in Luchuan, Guangxi, China. He joined the Chinese Revolutionary Alliance in 1906, becoming a brigade commander after the founding of the Republic of China. He joined the "Second Revolution" against Yuan Shikai in 1913, serving as left wing commander. When the revolution failed Lin fled to Japan and joined the Chinese Revolutionary Party. After that he went south and joined Sun Yat-sen until 1922, when he defected to Chen Jiongming, who made him military governor of Guangdong from 1924 to 1925. He fled to Shanghai after Chen was defeated in 1925.

=== Politics ===
Lin Hu became a member of the Legislative Yuan (parliament) after World War II and was elected vice-chairman of the Guangxi Provincial Political Consultative Conference after the Communist victory in the Chinese Civil War. He was also a member of the Standing Committee of the Chinese People's Political Consultative Conference. He died in February 1960.
