= Bai Chongxi =

Chinese general (1893–1966)

- 白崇禧
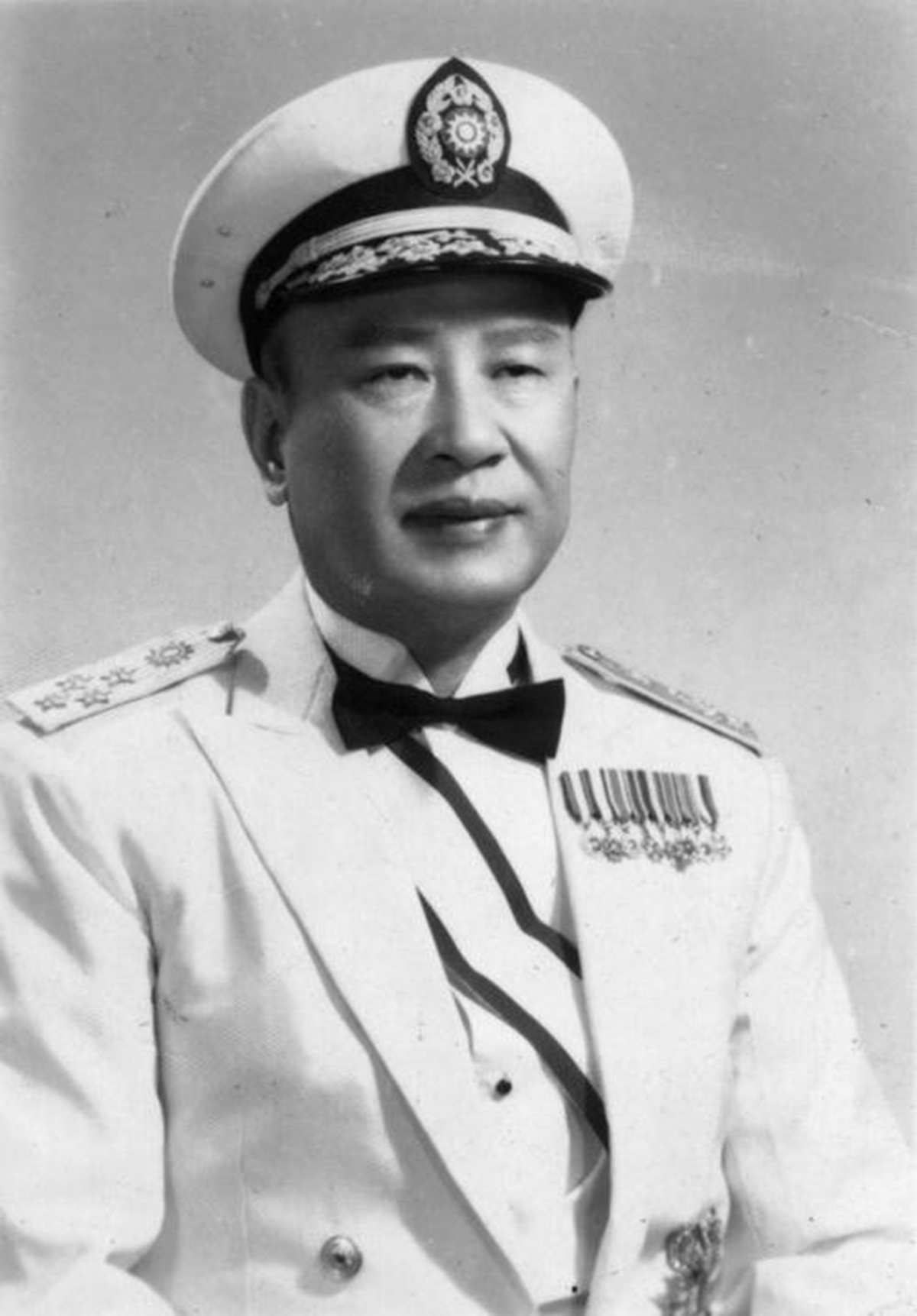

1st Minister of National Defense
- In office 23 May 1946 – 2 June 1948
- Preceded by: Chen Cheng as Minister of War
- Succeeded by: He Yingqin

Personal details
- Born: 18 March 1893 Guilin, Guangxi, Qing Empire
- Died: 2 December 1966 (aged 73) Taipei, Taiwan
- Party: Kuomintang
- Spouse: Ma P'ei-chang
- Children: 10, including Kenneth
- Education: Guangxi Military Cadre Training School; Baoding Military Academy
- Awards: Order of Blue Sky and White Sun; Order of the Sacred Tripod; Order of the Cloud and Banner (1st class); Order of Loyalty and Diligence; Commander of the Legion of Merit; Medal of Freedom (1945); Grand Officer of the Legion of Honour; Order of the Bath
- Nickname(s): The Wise Man, Little Zhuge

Military service
- Allegiance: Qing Empire; Republic of China
- Branch/service: New Army; National Revolutionary Army
- Years of service: 1907–1949
- Rank: General
- Unit: New Guangxi Clique
- Commands: Minister of National Defense, Central China Pacification Director
- Battles/wars: Xinhai Revolution; Northern Expedition; Shanghai Massacre; Central Plains War; Chinese Civil War; Long March; Second Sino-Japanese War; Battle of Xuzhou; Battle of Taierzhuang; Battle of Wuhan; 1st Battle of Changsha; Battle of South Guangxi; Battle of Kunlun Pass; 2nd Battle of Changsha; 3rd Battle of Changsha; Operation Ichi-Go; Battle of Guilin-Liuzhou; Chinese Civil War; Campaign to Defend Siping

Bai Chongxi (Note: Chinese: 白崇禧; pinyin: Bái Chóngxī; Wade–Giles: Pai Ch'ung-hsi, IPA: [pɑ́ɪ̯ t͡ʂʰʊ́ŋɕǐ], Xiao'erjing: ﺑَﻰْ ﭼْﻮ ثِ) (18 March 1893 – 2 December 1966) was a Chinese military general in the National Revolutionary Army of the Republic of China (ROC) and a prominent leader of the Kuomintang. He was of Hui ethnicity and of the Muslim faith.

From the mid-1920s to 1949, Bai and his close ally Li Zongren ruled Guangxi province as regional warlords with their own troops and considerable political autonomy. His relationship with Chiang Kai-shek was at various times antagonistic and cooperative. He and Li Zongren supported the anti-Chiang warlord alliance in the Central Plains War in 1930, then supported Chiang in the Second Sino-Japanese War and the Chinese Civil War. Bai was the first defense minister of the Republic of China from 1946 to 1948. After the Republic of China's loss in 1949, he fled to Taiwan alongside the government, where he died in 1966.

== Early life and Warlord era ==
Bai was born in Guilin, Guangxi, and given the courtesy name Jiansheng (健生). He was a descendant of a Persian merchant of the name Baiderluden (Badruddin), whose descendants adopted the Chinese surname Bai. His Muslim name was Omar Bai Chongxi.

He was the second of three sons. His family was said to have come from Sichuan. At the age of 14 he attended the Guangxi Military Cadre Training School in Guilin, a modern-style school run by Cai E to modernize Guangxi's military. Bai and classmates Huang Shaohong and Li Zongren would become the three leading figures of Guangxi's military. For a time Bai withdrew from the military school at the request of his family and studied at the civilian Guangxi Schools of Law and Political Science.

With the outbreak of the Xinhai Revolution in 1911, Bai joined a Students Dare to Die corps led by Huang. After entering the Nanjing Enlistment Corps, Bai transferred from the Corps to the Second Military Preparatory School at Wuchang. He graduated from the school in 1914, then underwent pre-cadet training for six months before attending the third class of Baoding Military Academy in June 1915. He became a 1st Guangxi Division probationary officer upon returning to Guangxi.

Bai rose to fame during the warlord era after allying with Huang (a deputy commander of the Model Battalion of the Guangxi First Division) and Li in support of Kuomintang leader Sun Yat-sen. This alliance, called the New Guangxi Clique, proceeded to move against Guangxi warlord Lu Rongting in 1924. The coalition's efforts brought Guangxi Province under ROC jurisdiction, and Bai and Li represented a new generation of Guangxi leaders.

The Nationalist chief of staff (acting) was Bai. The 13th Army had him as the commander. The Nationalist Northern Punitive Expedition was participated in by Bai.

During the Northern Expedition (1926–28) Bai was the Chief of Staff of the National Revolutionary Army and credited with many victories over the northern warlords, often using speed, maneuver and surprise to defeat larger enemy forces. He led the Eastern Route Army that conquered Hangzhou and Shanghai in 1927. As garrison commander of Shanghai, he also took part in the purge of Communist elements of the National Revolutionary Army on April 4, 1927, and of the labor unions in Shanghai. Bai also commanded the forward units that first entered Beijing and was credited with being the senior commander on site to complete the Northern Expedition. For many of his battlefield exploits during the Northern expedition, he was given the laudatory nickname Xiao Zhuge, literally "Zhuge Liang Jr.", of the Three Kingdoms fame. Bai was the commander of Kuomintang forces in the Shanghai massacre of 1927, where he directed the KMT purge of Communists in the party.

In 1928, during the Northern Expedition, Bai led Kuomintang forces in the defeat and destruction of Fengtian Clique Gen. Zhang Zongchang, capturing 20,000 of his 50,000 troops and almost capturing Zhang himself, who escaped to Manchuria.

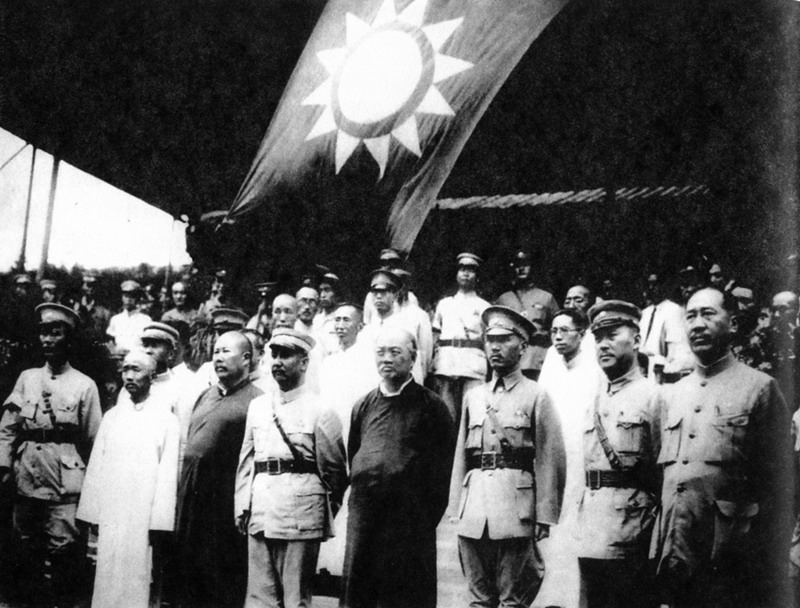
Chinese generals pay tribute to the Sun Yat-sen Mausoleum in Beijing in 1928 after the success of the Northern Expedition. From right to left, are Gen. Cheng Jin, Gen. Zhang Zuobao, Gen. Chen Diaoyuan, Gen. Chiang Kai-shek, Wu Zhihui, Gen. Yan Xishan, Gen. Ma Fuxiang, Gen. Ma Sida and Gen. Bai Chongxi.

Bai personally had around 2,000 Muslims under his control during his stay in Beijing in 1928 after the Northern Expedition was completed; it was reported by Time magazine that they "swaggered riotously" in the aftermath In June 1928 in Beijing, Bai Chongxi announced that the forces of the Kuomintang would seize control of Manchuria and the enemies of the Kuomintang would "scatter like dead leaves before the rising wind".

Bai was out of money and bankrupt in December 1928. He planned to lead 60,000 troops from east China to Xinjiang province and construct a railroad as a barrier against Russian encroachment in Xinjiang. His plan was perceived by some to be against Feng Yuxiang. The Military Council refused to authorize him leaving Beiping to go to Hankou.

At the end of the Northern Expedition, Chiang Kai-shek began to agitate to get rid of the Guangxi forces. At one time in 1929 Bai had to escape to Vietnam to avoid harm. Hubei and Guangxi were subjected to the Hankou subcouncil of Li Zongren and Bai Chongxi. Li and Bai's Hankou and Canton self-ruling governments were terminated by Chiang. Hankou was captured by Chiang during the dispute between the Guangxi faction and Nanjing. From 1930 to 1936, Bai was instrumental in the Reconstruction of Guangxi, which became a "model" province with a progressive administration. Guangxi supplied over 900,000 soldiers to the war effort against Japan.

During the Chinese Civil War Bai fought against the Communists. In the Long March he allowed the Communists to slip through Guangxi.

Bai was known for his administration of the province.

Prominent Muslims like Generals Ma Liang, Ma Fuxiang and Bai met in 1931 in Nanjing to discuss intercommunal tolerance between Hui and Han.

== Second Sino-Japanese War ==
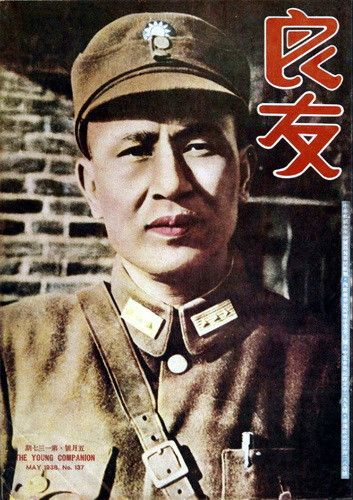
In May 1938, Bai Chongxi appeared on the cover of The Young Companion

The 4th Army Groups chief of staff was Bai Chongxi.

An anti-Japanese war was called for by Bai Chongxi, Li Zongren and Chen Jitang in 1936. The menace posed by Japan was seen by Bai Chongxi and Li Zongren.

Formal hostilities broke out on 7 July 1937 between China and Japan with the Marco Polo Bridge Incident outside Beijing. On 4 August 1937 Bai rejoined the Central Government at the invitation of Chiang Kai-shek. During the Second Sino-Japanese War, he was the Deputy Chief of the General Staff responsible for operations and training. He was the key strategist who convinced Chiang to adopt a "Total War" strategy in which China would trade space for time, adopt guerrilla tactics behind enemy lines and disrupt enemy supply lines at every opportunity. When the better armed and trained Japanese troops advanced, the Chinese would adopt a scorched earth campaign in the enemy's path to deny them local supply. Bai was also involved in many key campaigns including the first major victory at the Battle of Tai'erzhuang in Shandong Province in the spring of 1938 when he teamed up with Gen. Li Zongren to defeat a superior enemy. China managed to check and delay the Japanese advance for several months. Subsequently, Bai was appointed Commander of the Field Executive Office of the Military Council in Guilin, with responsibility for the 3rd, 4th, 7th and 9th War Zones. In that capacity he oversaw the successful defense of Changsha, capital of Hunan Province. Between 1939 and 1942, the Japanese attacked Changsha three times and were repelled each time. Bai also directed the Battle of South Guangxi and Battle of Kunlun Pass to retake South Guangxi. The 64th Army and 46th Army were requested to be outfitted by Bai via Gen. Lindsey.

Bai's Guangxi soldiers were praised as a "crack" (as in elite) army during the war against Japan, and he was known to be an able general who could lead the Chinese resistance should Chiang Kai-shek be assassinated. The majority of Chinese presumed that Chiang Kai-shek, as leader of China, tapped Bai to inherit his position. Bai Chongxi led the competent Guangxi Army against the Japanese.

In refusing to obey commands from Chiang if he assumed them to be wrong and flawed, Bai Chongxi was alone among fellow military men.

Jihad was declared obligatory and a religious duty for all Chinese Muslims against Japan after 1937 during the Second Sino-Japanese War. Bai also sheltered the Muslim Yuehua publication in Guilin, which printed quotes from the Quran and Hadith justifying the need for Chiang Kai-shek as leader of China. Also, promoted Chinese nationalism and uniting Hui to the Han during the war against Japan.

During the war, Bai traveled throughout the Muslim northwestern provinces of China controlled by the Ma Clique and met with Ma Clique generals to defeat Japanese propaganda. The Hui Muslim Xidaotang sect pledged allegiance to the Kuomintang after their rise to power and Bai Chongxi acquainted Chiang Kai-shek with the Xidaotang jiaozhu Ma Mingren in 1941 in Chongqing.

Bai Chongxi headed the Chinese Islamic National Salvation Federation. In January 1945, he was awarded the Legion of Merit of the United States.

== Chinese Civil War ==
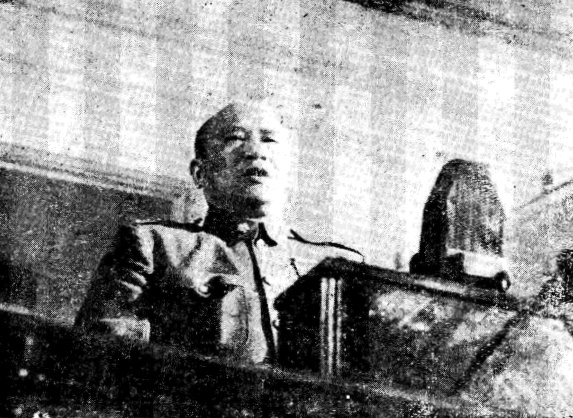
Bai Chongxi as the 1st Minister of National Defense of the Republic of China after the 1947 Constitution.

Following the surrender of Japan in 1945, the Chinese Civil War resumed in full-fledged fighting. In the spring of 1946 the Chinese Communists were active in Manchuria. A crack People's Liberation Army unit of 100,000 strong under the Communist Gen. Lin Biao occupied a key railroad junction at Siping. Kuomintang forces could not dislodge them after several attempts; Chiang Kai-shek then sent Bai to oversee the operation. After some redeployment, Nationalist forces were able to decisively defeat Lin's forces after a two-day pitched battle. This was to be the first major victory for the Kuomintang in the 1946-49 stage of the civil war before the fall of mainland China to the Chinese Communists.

In June 1946 Bai was appointed Minister of National Defense. It turned to be a post without power, as Chiang began to bypass Bai on major decisions regarding the Chinese Civil War. Chiang would hold daily briefings in his residence without inviting Bai and began to direct front-line troops personally down to the division level, bypassing the chain of command. The Civil War went poorly for the Kuomintang as Chiang's strategy of holding onto provincial capitals and leaving the countryside to the Communists very quickly caused the downfall of his forces, which had a 4:1 numerical superiority at the beginning of the conflict.

During the Ili Rebellion Bai was considered by the government for the post of Governor of Xinjiang. The position later was given to Masud Sabri, a pro-Kuomintang Uyghur leader.

In April 1948 the first National Assembly in China convened in Nanjing, with thousands of delegates from all over China representing different provinces and ethnic groups. Bai Chongxi, acting as Minister of National Defense, debriefed the Assembly on the military situation, completely ignoring Northern China and Manchuria in his report. Delegates from Manchuria in the assembly responded by yelling out and calling for the death of those responsible for the loss of Manchuria.

In November 1948 Bai, in command of forces in Hankou, met with Generals Fu Zuoyi, Zhang Zhizhong and Chiang Kai-shek in Nanjing about defending Suzhou, the gateway to the Yangzi River valley.

Bai told the Central Political Council of the Kuomintang that negotiating with the Communists would only make them more powerful. Governor of Hunan Cheng Qian, and Bai reached a consensus that they should impede the advance of the Communists by negotiating with them.

In January 1949, with the Communists close to victory, almost everyone in the Nationalist media, political and military command began to demand peace as a slogan and turn against Chiang. Bai Chongxi decided to follow suit with the mainstream current and defied Chiang Kai-shek's orders, refusing to battle Communists near the Huai River and demanding that his soldiers, which were "lent", be sent back to him so he could secure his hold in the province of Guangxi and ignore the central government in Nanjing. Bai was the commander of four armies in Central China in the Hankou region. He demanded that the government negotiate with the Communists like the others. Bai was in charge of the defense of the capital, Nanjing. He sent a telegram requesting that Chiang Kai-shek step down as president, amid a storm of requests by other Kuomintang military and political figures for Chiang to step down and allow a peace deal with the Communists.

When Communist Gen. Lin Biao mounted an attack on Bai Chongxi's forces in Hankou, they retreated quickly, leaving the "rice bowl" of China open for the Communists. Bai retreated to headquarters at Hengyang via a railroad from Hankou to Canton. The railroad then provided access to Guilin where his home was. In August at Hengyang, Bai Chongxi reorganized his troops. In October, as the Canton fell to the Communists, who were almost in complete control of China, Bai Chongxi still commanded 200,000 of his elite troops, making a return to Guangxi for a final stand after covering for Canton.

== Taiwan ==
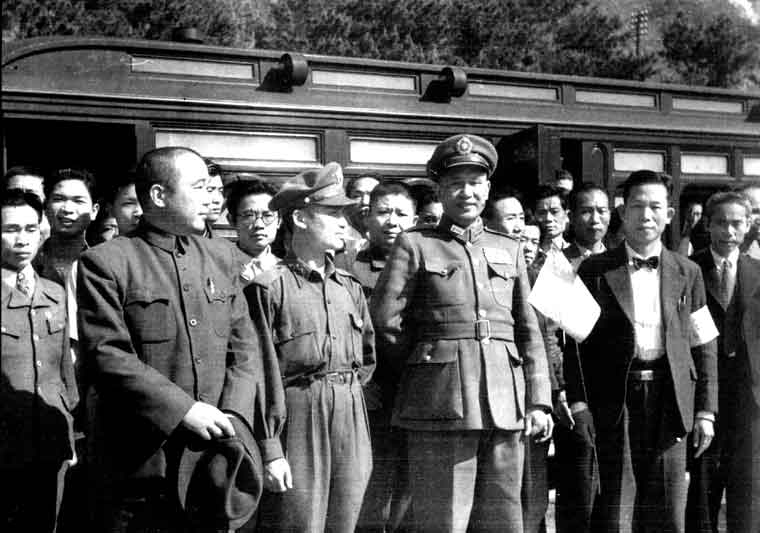
Bai Chongxi in Taiwan after the February 28 Incident.

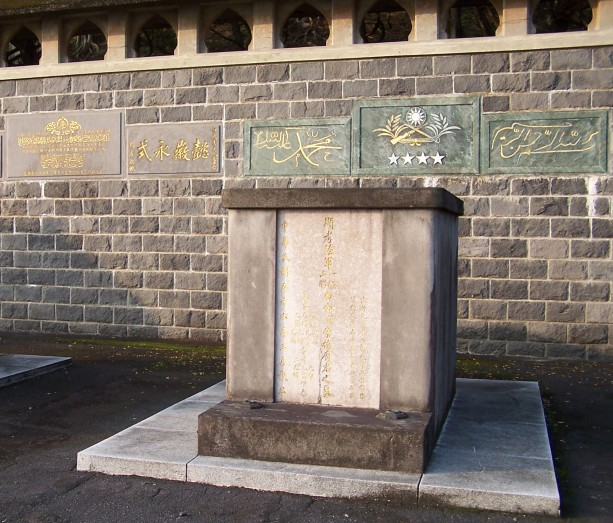
Grave of Bai Chongxi at Taipei Muslim Cemetery on Chongde Street, Xinyi District, Taipei

The riots following the February 28 Incident of 28 February 1947 that broke out in Taiwan due to poor governance by the central government appointed officials and the garrison forces caused many casualties of both native Taiwanese and mainland residents. Bai was sent as Chiang Kai-shek's personal representative on a fact finding mission and to help pacify the populace. After a two-week tour, including interviews with various segments of the Taiwan population, Bai made sweeping recommendations, including replacement of the governor, and prosecution of his chief of secret police. He also granted amnesty to student violators of peace on the condition that their parents take custody and guarantee subsequent proper behavior. For his forthright actions, native Taiwanese held him in high regard.

Bai had another falling out with Chiang when he supported General Li Zongren, his fellow Guangxi comrade-in-arms, for the vice presidency in the 1948 general election when Li won against Chiang's hand picked candidate, Sun Fo. Chiang then removed Bai from the Defense Minister post and assigned him the responsibility for Central and South China. Bai's forces were the last ones to leave the mainland for Hainan Island and eventually to Taiwan.

He served Chief of the General Staff since 1927 until his retirement in 1949. After he came to Taiwan, he was the appointed vice director of the strategic advisory commission in the presidential office. He also continued to serve in the Central Executive Committee of the Kuomintang. He reorganized the party from 1950 to 1952.

After the Communist victory, some of Bai Chongxi's Guangxi troops fled to French Indochina where they were detained. Others went to Hainan in retreat.

In 1951, Bai Chongxi made a speech to the entire Muslim world calling for a war against the Soviet Union, claiming that the "imperialist ogre" leader Joseph Stalin was engineering World War III, and Bai also called upon Muslims to avoid the Indian leader Jawaharlal Nehru, accusing him of being blind to Soviet imperialism.

He and Chiang never reconciled and he lived in semi-retirement until he died of coronary thrombosis on 2 December 1966 at the age of 73. Bai was then given a military funeral by the government, with a Kuomintang Blue Sky with a White Sun flag over his coffin. Bai was buried in the Muslim section of the Liuzhangli (六張犁) Cemetery in Taipei, Taiwan.

== Personal life ==
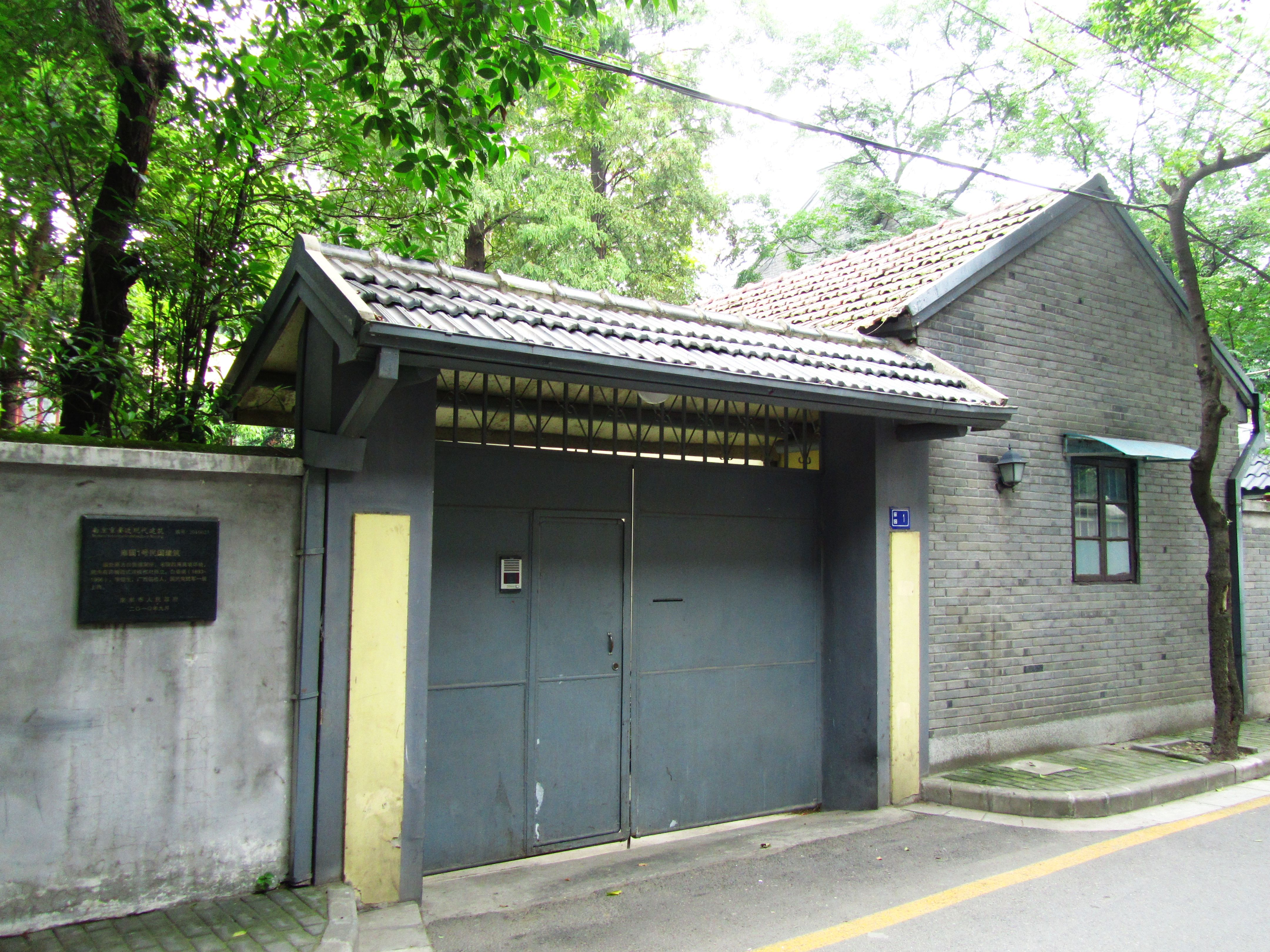
Bai Chongxi's former residence in Nanjing.

As a Muslim, he was Chairman of the Chinese Islamic National Salvation Federation, and then the Chinese Muslim Association. Bai Chongxi was a board member of the All-China Inter-religious Association, representing Islam, the other members of the board were a Catholic bishop, Methodist bishop, and the Buddhist abbot Taixu.

Bai sent his son Pai Hsien-yung to Catholic schools in Hong Kong.

During the Northern Expedition, in 1926 in Guangxi, Bai Chongxi led his troops in destroying Buddhist temples and smashing idols, turning the temples into schools and Kuomintang party headquarters. It was reported that almost all of Buddhist monasteries in Guangxi were destroyed by Bai in this manner. The monks were removed. Bai led a wave of anti-foreignism in Guangxi, attacking American, European, and other foreigners and missionaries, and generally making the province unsafe for foreigners. Westerners fled from the province, and some Chinese Christians were also attacked as imperialist agents.

The three goals of his movement were anti-foreignism, anti-imperialism, and anti-religion. Bai led the anti-religious movement, against superstition. Huang Shaohong, also a Kuomintang member of the New Guangxi Clique, supported Bai's campaign, and Huang was a non-Muslim, the anti religious campaign was agreed upon by all Guangxi Kuomintang members, so it may have not had anything to do with Bai's beliefs.

As a Kuomintang member, Bai and the other Guangxi clique members allowed the Communists to continue attacking foreigners and idols, since they shared the goal of expelling the foreign powers from China, but they stopped Communists from initiating social change.

British diplomats reported that he also drank wine and ate pork in spite of his religion.

Bai Chongxi was interested in Xinjiang, a predominately Muslim province. He wanted to resettle disbanded Chinese soldiers there to prevent it from being seized by the Soviet Union. Bai personally wanted to lead an expedition to seize back Xinjiang to bring it under Chinese control, in the style that Zuo Zongtang led during the Dungan revolt. Bai's partner in the Guangxi clique Huang Shaohong planned an invasion of Xinjiang. During the Kumul Rebellion, Chiang Kai-shek was ready to send Huang Shaohong and his expeditionary force which he assembled to assist Muslim general Ma Zhongying against Sheng Shicai, but when Chiang heard about the Soviet invasion of Xinjiang, he decided to withdraw to avoid an international incident if his troops directly engaged the Soviets, leaving Ma alone without reinforcements to fight the Red Army. Huang was suspicious of this, suspecting that Chiang feared that the Guangxi clique was trying to take control of Xinjiang themselves rather than for Chiang's Nanjing regime.

== Impact ==
Bai's reputation as a military strategist was well known. Evans Carlson, a United States Marine Corps colonel, noted that Bai "was considered by many to be the keenest of Chinese military men." Edgar Snow went even further, calling him "one of the most intelligent and efficient commanders boasted by any army in the world."

Bai is the father of Kenneth Pai Hsien-yung, Taiwanese author and playwright now living in the United States. Bai and his wife had ten children, three girls and seven boys. He married his wife Ma P'ei-chang in 1925.

Of his ten children, three are still living, scattered across America and Taiwan. Taipei Mayor Hau Lung-pin announced in March 2013 that Bai's tomb will form the basis for a Muslim cultural area and Taiwan historical park.

Bai's maternal grandson Muhammad Ma is a Halal butcher, and travels across Taiwan working to preserve the Taiwanese Islamic Community. He also helps foreign migrants with any legal issues they may face in Taiwan.

== Awards and decorations ==
=== National ===
- Order of Blue Sky and White Sun (10 October 1943)
- Order of the Sacred Tripod (degree unknown)
- First Class of the Order of the Cloud and Banner (April 1937)
- Order of Loyalty and Diligence (10 October 1945)
- Third Class of the Order of Honour of Renaissance.
- Medal of the Armed Forces, A-1
- Medal of Victory in the War of Resistance (1946)
- War Memorial Medal (1946)
- Order of Grand Community (1 January 1947)
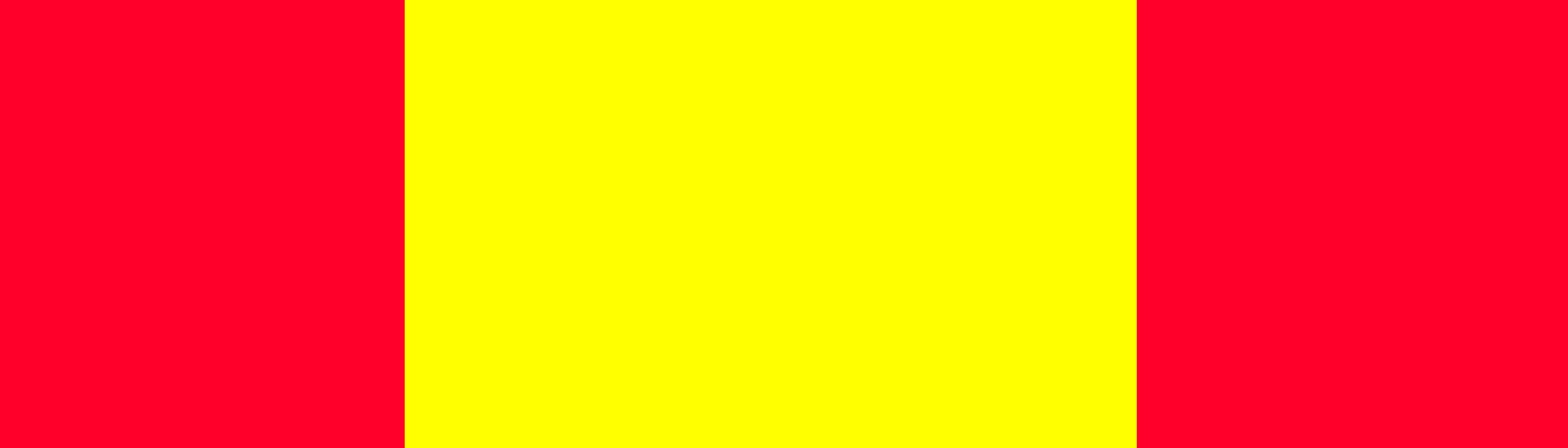
- Medal for Honorable Chinese Descendants
- Commemorative Medal for the Prime Minister's Last Words and Deeds
- Military Commission Officers Training Corps Commemorative Medal
- Commemorative Medal for the 10th Anniversary of the Oath-Taking Ceremony of the Northern Expedition of the National Revolutionary Army (1936)

=== Foreign ===
- Grand Officer of the Legion of Honour (France, 1945)
- Knight Grand Cross of the Order of the Bath (United Kingdom, 1945)
- Commander of the Legion of Merit (United States, 1945)
- Medal of Freedom with gold palm (United States)

== See also ==
- Islam in China
- Islam in Taiwan

== Notes ==
Government offices
Preceded by Office created, previously Chen Cheng was Minister of War	ROC Minister of National Defense; 1946–1948	Succeeded by He Yingqin
