= Tan Haoming =

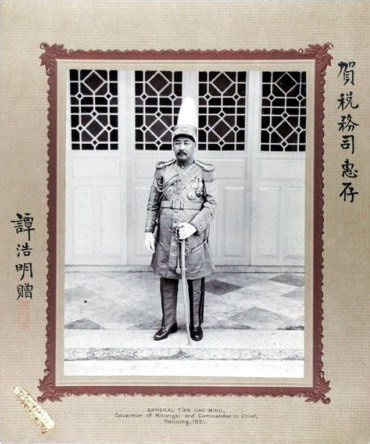
Tan Haoming (1918)

Tan Haoming (simplified Chinese: 谭浩明; traditional Chinese: 譚浩明; pinyin: Tán Hàomíng; 3 July 1871 – 17 April 1925) was a member of the Old Guangxi Clique and military governor of Guangxi from April 1917 to July 1921. He was born on 3 July 1871 in Longzhou County, Guangxi province, China, and died on 17 April 1925. He was of Zhuang ethnicity.
