= Old Guangxi clique =

Historical Warlord Clique in China

The Old Guangxi Clique (traditional Chinese: 舊桂系; simplified Chinese: 旧桂系; pinyin: Jiù Guì Xì) was a powerful warlord clique in the Republic of China based in Guangxi. Led by Lu Rongting, the clique was able to take control of neighbouring Hunan and Guangdong provinces as well. Along with the Yunnan clique, they formed the core of opposition to Yuan Shikai's monarchist ambitions during the National Protection War. With Yunnan and Sun Yat-sen's Chinese Revolutionary Party, they started the Constitutional Protection Movement. They quickly came to disagree with Sun and squeezed him out of power. Sun, Chen Jiongming, and the Yunnan clique defeated them in the Guangdong-Guangxi War. With the defeat of Lu Rongting by the Guangdong Army, the Old Guangxi Clique crumbled in the early 1920s, and was replaced by the pro-Sun New Guangxi Clique.

== See also ==
- Warlord era
- Bai Chongxi
- List of warlords
