= List of treaties of China before the People's Republic =

This is a list of treaties that have been negotiated, signed and/or ratified by China before the establishment of the People's Republic in 1949, including the imperial Chinese dynasties and the Republic of China (1912–1949). The treaty as a legal document in international law can describe either a specific international instrument or a general category of such instruments of agreement. This list includes the most important examples of both formal treaties and other agreements between China and other nations in this period.

== Tang dynasty ==
#	Year	Date	Name	Location	Chinese name	Other party	Note
1	783	-	Treaty of Qingshui	Qingshui	清水之盟	Tibetan Empire	
2	822	-	Changqing Treaty	Chang'an	長慶會盟	Tibetan Empire	

== Song dynasty ==
#	Year	Date	Name	Location	Chinese name	Other party	Note
1	1005	Jan 28	Chanyuan Treaty	Chanzhou	澶淵之盟	Liao dynasty	
2	1141	Dec 17	Treaty of Shaoxing		紹興和議	Jin dynasty	

== Ming dynasty ==
#	Year	Date	Name	Location	Chinese name	Other party	Note
1	1554	-	Luso-Chinese agreement		中葡協定	Portugal	Oral trade agreement

== Qing dynasty ==
#	Year	Date	Name	Location	Chinese name	Other party	Note
1	1689	Sep 7	Treaty of Nerchinsk	Nerchinsk	尼布楚條約	Russia	First treaty signed by Qing China, concluding the Sino-Russian border conflicts
2	1727	Oct 21	Treaty of Kiakhta	Kyakhta	恰克圖界約	Russia	Also included 布連斯奇界約, 阿巴哈依圖界約 and 色楞額界約, all signed in 1727
3	1739	-	Treaty with the Dzungar Khanate			Dzungar Khanate	Ceasefire during the Dzungar–Qing Wars
4	1768	Oct 30	Convention of Kyakhta	Kyakhta	修改恰克圖界約第十條	Russia	Addendum to the Treaty of Kiakhta, modifying Article X of the original treaty
5	1769	Dec 22	Treaty of Kaungton	Kaungton	中緬臨時和約	Burma	Tentative agreement in the Sino-Burmese War, then repudiated by both sides
6	1792	Feb 20	Kyakhta International Protocol	Kyakhta	恰克圖市約	Russia	
7	1792	Oct 2	Treaty of Betrawati	Betrawati	貝德勒沃蒂條約	Nepal	
8	1835	-	Sino-Kokand accord		中國—浩罕協定	Kokand Khanate	
9	1841	Jan 20	Convention of Chuenpi	Humen	穿鼻條約	United Kingdom	Tentative agreement in the First Opium War, then repudiated by both sides
10	1842	Aug 29	Treaty of Nanking	Nanjing	南京條約/江寧條約	United Kingdom	Concluded the First Opium War
11	1842	Sep 17	Treaty of Chushul	Leh	楚舒勒條約	Sikh Empire	Concluded the Dogra–Tibetan war (Sino-Sikh war)
12	1843	Oct 8	Treaty of the Bogue	Humen	虎門條約	United Kingdom	Supplemented the Treaty of Nanking
13	1844	Jul 3	Treaty of Wanghia	Macau	望廈條約	United States	First treaty between China and the United States
14	1844	Oct 24	Treaty of Whampoa	Huangpu	黃埔條約	France	First treaty between China and France
15	1846	Apr 4	Guangzhou Convention	Human	英軍退還舟山條約	United Kingdom	
16	1847	Mar 20	Treaty of Canton	Guangzhou	中瑞挪廣州條約	Sweden/Norway	First treaty between China and Sweden/Norway
17	1851	Aug 6	Treaty of Kulja	Yining	伊犁塔爾巴哈臺通商章程	Russia	First treaty between China and Russia in the 19th century
18	1856	Mar 24	Treaty of Thapathali	Kathmandu	藏尼條約	Nepal	Concluded the Nepal–Tibet War
19	1858	May 28	Treaty of Aigun	Aigun	璦琿條約	Russia	During the Second Opium War, but China refused to ratify it
20	1858	Jun 13	Treaty of Tientsin	Tianjin	中俄天津條約	Russia	During the Second Opium War
21	1858	Jun 18	Treaty of Tientsin	Tianjin	中美天津條約	United States	During the Second Opium War
22	1858	Jun 26	Treaty of Tientsin	Tianjin	中英天津條約	United Kingdom	During the Second Opium War
23	1858	Jun 27	Treaty of Tientsin	Tianjin	中法天津條約	France	During the Second Opium War
24	1860	Oct 24	Convention of Peking	Beijing	中英北京條約	United Kingdom	Concluded the Second Opium War
25	1860	Oct 25	Convention of Peking	Beijing	中法北京條約	France	Concluded the Second Opium War
26	1860	Nov 14	Convention of Peking	Beijing	中俄北京條約	Russia	Confirmed the terms in the Treaty of Aigun
27	1861	Sep 2	Treaty with Germany	Tianjin	中德通商條約	Prussia	Following the Eulenburg expedition
28	1863	Jul 13	Treaty with Denmark	Tianjin	中丹天津條約	Denmark	
29	1864	Oct 7	Treaty of Tarbagatai	Tacheng	中俄勘分西北界約記/塔城界約	Russia	
30	1868	Jul 28	Burlingame Treaty	Washington, D.C.	中美天津條約續增條款	United States	
31	1869	Oct 23	Alcock Convention	Beijing	中英新修條約	United Kingdom	Not ratified by the United Kingdom
32	1871	Sep 13	Sino-Japanese Friendship and Trade Treaty	Tianjin	中日修好條規	Japan	First treaty between China and the Empire of Japan
33	1874	Oct 31	Instrument settling Ryukyu-Taiwan affair	Beijing	中日北京專條	Japan	
34	1876	Sep 13	Chefoo Convention	Zhifu	煙臺條約	United Kingdom	Ratified in 1885
35	1879	Oct 2	Treaty of Livadia	Livadia	里瓦幾亞條約	Russia	Repudiated by China and replaced by the Treaty of Saint Petersburg
36	1880	Mar 31	Supplementary Convention with Germany	Beijing	中德續修條約	Germany	
37	1880	Nov 17	Angell Treaty of 1880	Beijing	中美續修條約	United States	
38	1881	Feb 24	Treaty of Saint Petersburg	Saint Petersburg	中俄伊犁條約/改訂條約	Russia	
39	1882	Oct 1	China–Korea Treaty of 1882	Tianjin	中朝商民水陸貿易章程	Joseon	First treaty between China and Joseon in the 19th century
40	1882	Oct 29	Sino-Russian boundary treaty	Yining	中俄伊犁界約	Russia	
41	1885	Apr 18	Convention of Tientsin	Tianjin	中日天津會議專條	Japan	Following the Gapsin Coup in Joseon
42	1885	Jun 9	Treaty of Tianjin	Tianjin	中法新約/中法會訂越南條款	France	Following the Sino-French War and recognized the French rule in Vietnam
43	1886	Jul 24	Convention concerning Burma and Tibet	Beijing	中英緬甸條款	United Kingdom	Recognized the British annexation of Burma
44	1886	Apr 25	Convention of Tianjin	Tianjin	中法越南邊界通商章程	France	
45	1887	Dec 1	Sino-Portuguese Treaty of Peking	Beijing	中葡和好通商條約	Portugal	Recognized the Portugal colonial rights in Macao
46	1887	Jun 26	Convention of Beijing	Beijing	中法續議界務專條	France	
47	1887	Jun 26	Additional Commercial Convention	Beijing	中法續議商務專條	France	
48	1890	Mar 17	Convention of Calcutta	Kolkata	中英藏印條約	United Kingdom	Recognized the British control over Sikkim
49	1893	Dec 5	Relating to Sikkim and Tibet of 1890	Darjeeling	中英藏印續約	United Kingdom	
50	1894	Mar 17	Gresham-Yang Treaty	Washington, D.C.	限禁來美華工保護寓美華人條約	United States	Withdrawal of China in 1904
51	1895	Apr 17	Treaty of Shimonoseki	Shimonoseki	馬關條約	Japan	Following the First Sino-Japanese War
52	1895	Jun 20	Additional Commercial Articles 1895	Beijing	中法續議商務專條附章	France	
53	1896	Jun 3	Li–Lobanov Treaty	Saint Petersburg	中俄密約/禦敵互相援助條約	Russia	Secret treaty
54	1898	Mar 6	Treaty with Germany concerning Kiaochow Bay	Beijing	中德膠澳租界條約	Germany	For the Kiautschou Bay Leased Territory
55	1898	Mar 27	Convention for the Lease of the Liaotung Peninsula	Beijing	旅大租地條約	Russia	For the Kwantung Leased Territory
56	1898	Jul 6	Treaty on South Manchurian Railway	Saint Petersburg	東省鐵路公司續約合同	Russia	
57	1898	Jun 9	Convention for the Extension of Hong Kong Territory	Beijing	展拓香港界址專條	United Kingdom	For the lease of the New Territories
58	1899	Nov 16	Treaty of Kwangchow Wan	Guangzhou Bay	廣州灣租界條約	France	For the Leased Territory of Guangzhouwan
59	1899	Jul 29	Hague Convention of 1899	The Hague	海牙公約	Various countries	Negotiated at international peace conferences
60	1901	Sep 7	Boxer Protocol	Beijing	辛丑條約/各國和約	11 countries	Concluded the Eight-Nation Alliance's defeat of the Boxer Rebellion
61	1902	Apr 8	Convention with regard to Manchuria	Beijing	交收東三省條約	Russia	
62	1902	Sep 5	Mackay Treaty	Shanghai	中英續議通商行船條約	United Kingdom	
63	1903	Oct 8	Treaty of Shanghai	Shanghai	中美通商行船續約	United States	
64	1904	Sep 7	Convention of Lhasa	Lhasa	拉薩條約	United Kingdom	Following the British expedition to Tibet, but China refused to sign it
65	1904	Dec 21	Hague Convention on Hospital Ships	The Hague	關於戰時醫院船免稅的公約	Various countries	Supplemented the Hague Convention of 1899
66	1905	Dec 22	Treaty with regard to Manchuria	Beijing	中日會議東三省事宜條約	Japan	Following the Russo-Japanese War
67	1906	Apr 27	Anglo-Chinese Convention Regarding Tibet	Beijing	中英續訂藏印條約	United Kingdom	Concluded the British expedition to Tibet
68	1907	Oct 18	Hague Convention of 1907	The Hague	海牙公約	Various countries	Negotiated at international peace conferences
69	1908	Apr 20	Treaty on Tibet Trade	Kolkata	中英修訂藏印通商章程	United Kingdom	
70	1908	Jul 2	Sino-Swedish Treaty of 1908	Beijing	中瑞通商條約	Sweden	First treaty between China and modern Sweden
71	1909	Sep 4	Gando Convention	Beijing	圖們江中韓界務條款	Japan	
72	1911	May 8	Treaty Concerning Opium	Beijing	中英禁煙條件	United Kingdom	
73	1911	Dec 20	Treaty of Manzhouli	Qiqihar	滿洲里界約	Russia	Not ratified by China

== Republic of China ==
#	Year	Date	Name	Location	Chinese name	Other party	Note
1	1914	Jul 3	Simla Convention	Simla	西姆拉條約	Tibet, United Kingdom	Not signed by China
2	1915	Jan 18	Twenty-One Demands		二十一條	Japan	China reluctantly accepted most terms
3	1915	May 29	Treaty of Kyakhta	Kyakhta	中俄蒙協約	Mongolia, Russia	
4	1918	May 16/19	Sino-Japanese Joint Defence Agreement	Beijing	中日共同防敵軍事協定	Japan	Following China's entry into the World War I
5	1919	Jun 28	Treaty of Versailles	Versailles	凡爾賽條約	Various countries	Concluded the World War I, but China refused to sign it
6	1922	Feb 6	Nine-Power Treaty	Washington, D.C.	九國公約	8 countries	Following the Washington Naval Conference
7	1924	May 31	Sino-Soviet agreement of 1924	Beijing	中蘇解決懸案大綱協定	Soviet Union	
8	1925	Jun 17	Geneva Protocol	Geneva	日內瓦議定書	Various countries	
9	1928	-	Treaty Concerning Tariff Regulation		關稅條約	Various countries	Signed separately for each country
10	1933	May 31	Tanggu Truce	Tanggu	塘沽協定	Japan	Following the Japanese invasion of Manchuria
11	1935	Jun 10	He–Umezu Agreement	Beijing	何梅協定	Japan	
12	1935	Jun 27	Qin–Doihara Agreement	Beijing	秦土協定	Japan	Following the North Chahar incident
13	1937	Aug 21	Sino-Soviet Non-Aggression Pact	Nanjing	中蘇互不侵犯條約	Soviet Union	During the Second Sino-Japanese War
14	1943	Jan 11	Sino-American Treaty abolition of extraterritoriality	Washington, D.C.	關於取消美國在華治外法權及處理有關問題之條約	United States	During the World War II
15	1943	Jan 11	Sino-British Treaty abolition of extraterritoriality	Chongqing	關於取消英國在華治外法權及其有關特權條約	United Kingdom	During the World War II
16	1945	Jun 26	Charter of the United Nations	San Francisco	聯合國憲章	Various countries	Foundational treaty of the United Nations
17	1945	Aug 14	Sino-Soviet Treaty of Friendship and Alliance	Moscow	中蘇友好同盟條約	Soviet Union	At the end of the World War II
18	1945	Oct 10	Double Tenth Agreement	Chongqing	雙十協定	Chinese Communist Party	At the end of the World War II
19	1946	Nov 4	Sino-American Treaty of Commerce & Navigation	Nanjing	中美友好通商航海條約	United States	
20	1947	Apr 18	Sino-Philippine Treaty of Amity	Manila	中菲友好條約	Philippines	

== See also ==
- Unequal treaties
- List of treaties
- List of Chinese treaty ports
- Century of humiliation
- Western imperialism in Asia

== Bibliography ==
- 王鐵崖 (1957). 中外舊約章彙編. 生活・讀書・新知三联书店.
