= Treaty for Relinquishment of Extraterritorial Rights in China =

The Treaty for Relinquishment of Extraterritorial Rights in China may refer to one of two treaties signed on 11 January 1943, which are both also abbreviated as the New Equal Treaty:

- Sino-American Treaty for the Relinquishment of Extraterritorial Rights in China
- Sino-British Treaty for the Relinquishment of Extra-Territorial Rights in China
