= Hughes Dubois =

Photographer of artworks

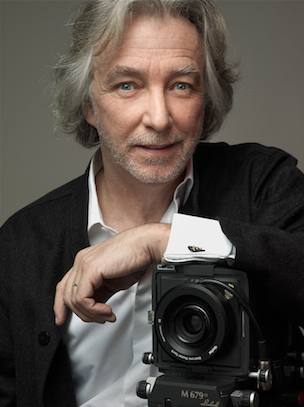
- Born: 1957 (age 67–68); Tournai, Belgium
- Education: Ecole supérieure des arts Saint-Luc (Belgium)
- Notable work: Borobudur under the full moon
- Style: Photographer
- Awards: International Book Art Tribal Price, 2014; Best photography MGA Book Award, 2014
- Website: www.hughesdubois.be

Hughes Dubois (born 1957) is a photographer specialized in the photography of artworks.

His "photographic gaze", in the words of Danièle Gillemon, produced by a combination of staging and lighting of objects, has influenced the form of photography in many museums, institutions, art galleries and private collections.

Parallel to his career in artwork photography, Dubois has developed his own artistic practice, with works appearing in galleries and art books. Over his career spanning 40 years, his ongoing goal has been to demonstrate the great sensitivity of both tribal and classical arts.

== Biography ==
Dubois was born in Tournai, Belgium and took up photography at the age of twelve, taking photographs of landscapes and strangers in the street. He began his artistic training at the Écoles Supérieures des Arts Saint-Luc (Mons, Belgium) then embarked on architectural studies at the École Saint-Luc (Brussels, Belgium), before switching to study photography in Ath (Belgium).

In 1977, Dubois started his professional career as an advertising photographer at the Studio Asselberghs (Belgium). In 1978, he developed a passion for photographing art after seeing his first Hemba statuette.

=== Photography of artworks ===
In 1982, he set off on a voyage across the Americas with Émile Deletaille to produce several publications on pre-Columbian arts. In 1984, he met Michel Leveau, founder of the Musée Dapper in Paris, for whom he has produced thirty plus publications on African tribal arts.

In 1999, he was contacted by Jacques Kerchache in relation to his project to create the Musée du Quai Branly. Dubois photographed the works presented in the Pavillon des Sessions as an initiative to bring the tribal arts back to the Louvre. «Sculptures» would be the first work to be published by the Musée du Quai Branly, followed by others. In 2003, Dubois set up, in collaboration with Tibet specialist Amy Heller, an iconographic collection of the arts of the peoples of Himalaya for the Art Institute of Chicago. This project would lead to the publication of the book Himalayas – An Aesthetic Adventure.

In 2012, he worked for the Museum of Islamic Art, Doha, taking photographs for a book presenting the Doha masterpieces at the Musée du Louvre as part of the From Cordova to Samarkand exhibition. In 2013, for the opening of the Department of Islamic Art at the Musée du Louvre, Lebanese artist Walid Raad's exhibition featured works produced from photographs of Islamic artworks taken by Hughes Dubois. On this occasion, the Louvre Museum and the artist published Préface à la troisième édition.

Dubois has collaborated with numerous museums including: AfricaMuseum - Royal Museum for Central Africa (Brussels, Belgium), Musée du Quai Branly - Jacques Chirac (Paris, France), Art Institute of Chicago, King Baudouin Foundation (Belgium), Fondation Dapper (Paris, France), Baur Foundation – Museum of Far Eastern Art (Geneva, Switzerland), Guimet Museum (Paris, France), Le Louvre (Paris, France), Musée des arts décoratifs (Paris, France), Museum of Islamic Art, Doha (Doha, Qatar), Beyeler Foundation (Switzerland), The Al-Mansouria Foundation For Culture and Creativity (Saudi Arabia) and other art collections all over the world.

=== Artistic work ===
In 2004, the exhibition Le Sensible et La Force was held at the AfricaMuseum - Royal Museum for Central Africa (Brussels, Belgium) and an eponymous portfolio of 24 silver prints was published in a 12-copy edition. This body of work consisted in «extracting the portraits» of statues by showing their sensitivity and humanity, in order to underline their power and beauty.

In 2013, Formes et Façons was shown at the Val de Bagnes Museum and the Mauvoisin Dam (Switzerland).

From 2013 to 2017, Dubois worked on Borobudur Under the Full Moon, a photographic project undertaken with his wife Caroline Leloup Dubois, which took three years — and over 110 nights — to shoot the world's biggest Buddhist temple, Borobudur (Indonesia). Since 2018, Borobudur Under the Full Moon has toured as a travelling exhibition under the patronage of UNESCO. A limited edition of 9 copies of an eponymous portfolio in platinum palladium and an art book were published on this occasion.

== Awards and recognition ==
In 2014, the Bismarck Archipelago Art catalogue was awarded the International Tribal Art Book Prize – the ICMA Award and the Best Photography Prize of the MGA Book Award.

== Exhibitions ==
Since 1982, Dubois’ work has been shown in personal and group exhibitions.

=== Personal exhibitions ===
- 1981: Voyage - Maison culturelle de la Tour Burbant, Ath, Belgium
- 1982: Ath, ses gens, son cortège - Maison culturelle de la Tour Burbant, Ath, Belgium
- 1986: Ouverture sur les arts africains - Musée Dapper, Paris
- 2004: Le sensible & La force - AfricaMuseum - Musée royal de l'Afrique centrale de Tervuren, Belgium
- 2006: Evelyne Lepage Gallery, Belgium
- 2008: Biennale des antiquaires, Paris, Galerie 54, France
- 2008: Biennale des antiquaires, Paris - Galerie Bernard Dulon, France
- 2010: Collection Durand-Dessert - Monnaie de Paris, France
- 2013: Formes & Façons – Musée de Bagne, Verbier, Switzerland
- 2013: Monvoisin Dam, Switzerland
- 2015: Hughes Dubois: 35 year career in photography - Parcours des Mondes, Paris
- 2022: Hughes Dubois, sculpteur d’ombres et de lumières – Galerie Origines – Rencontres internationales de la photographie, Arles, France

=== Exhibitions of Caroline & Hughes Dubois ===
- 2018: Borobudur Joyau de l'art bouddhique, Baur Museum, Geneva, Switzerland
- 2018: Borobudur Under The Full Moon, Cedart Gallery, Geneva, Switzerland
- 2018: Borobudur Under The Full Moon, Musée départemental d'art religieux de Sées, France
- 2018: Borobudur Under The Full Moon, Mairie du 1er arrondissement de Paris(1st district town hall), France
- 2018: Borobudur Under The Full Moon, Ubud Writers & Readers Festival, Indonesia
- 2019: Bouddha La légende dorée, Guimet Museum, France

=== Major group exhibitions ===
- 1997: État de sièges - Galerie Voutât, Geneva, Suisse
- 2006: Galerie Forêt Verte - Paris
- 2014: Primitivisme dans la photographie - Galerie Valois, Paris
- 2018: Wormholes 1, Galerie Laure Roynette, Paris
- 2018: Wormholes 2, La Ruche, Paris

== Collections ==
Dubois' photographs have joined public and private collections all over the world.

- AfricaMuseum - Musée royal de l'Afrique centrale de Tervuren (Belgium)
- Al-Mansouria Foundation (Saudi Arabia)
- Art Institute Of Chicago (USA)
- Baur Foundation (Switzerland)
- Musée BELvue (Belgium)
- Beyeler Foundation (Switzerland)
- Dapper Foundation (France)
- King Baudouin Foundation (Belgium)
- Hergé Foundation (Belgium)
- Le Louvre (France)
- Musée des Arts décoratifs (France)
- Museum Of Islamic Art (Qatar)
- Guimet Museum (France)
- Novartis (Switzerland)
- Musée du Quai Branly - Jacques Chirac (France)

== Publications ==
- Deletaille, Emile (1985). Chefs d'œuvre inédits de l'art précolombien. Boulogne: Arts 135. ISBN 2905351004.
- Chefs d'œuvre inédits de l'art africain. Paris: Éditions Bordas et Fondation DAPPER. 1987. p. 319. ISBN 2040129413.
- Yves Le Fur (1990). Résonnances. Paris: Musée Dapper. p. 143. ISBN 2-906067-11-3.
- Anne Leurquin; Jan Debbaut; Herman Burssens; Elze Bruyninx; Marie-Louise Bastin; Joseph Cornet (1988). Utotombo L'Art d'Afrique noire dans les collections privées belges. Bruxelles: Société des expositions du Palais des Beaux arts. p. 337.
- Valérie Beau; Laurence Husson; Christiane Flagayrettes; Phyllis M. Martin; Adams Jones (1989). Objets interdits. Paris: Musée Fondation Dapper. p. 375. ISBN 9782906067097.
- Dora Janssen (1992). Trésors du nouveau monde. Bruxelles: Musée Royal d'art et d'histoire. p. 484. ISBN 296000390X.
- Vincent Bounoure (1992). Vision d'Océanie. Paris: Musée Fondation Dapper. p. 252. ISBN 2906067202.
- Jacques Kerchache (2000). Sculptures. Paris: Musée du Louvre / Musée du Quai Branly, R.M.N. Éditions. p. 476. ISBN 9782711837717.
- Le chameau chinois du Musée Guimet. Paris: Musée Guimet. 2001. p. 59.
- Pratapaditya Pal; Amy Heller (2003). Himalayas – An Aesthetic Adventure. Chicago: Art Institute of Chicago. p. 312. ISBN 978-0520239005.
- Anne-Marie Bouttiaux; Viviane Baeke; Hughes Dubois (2004). Le sensible et la force. Bruxelles: Musée royal de l'Afrique centrale. p. 88. ISBN 9789075894608.
- Peter Fuhring; Michèle Bimbenet-Privat; Alexis Kugel (2005). Orfèvrerie francaise. La Collection Jourdan-Barry. Paris: J.Kugel. p. 285. OCLC 70187494.
- Geneviève Le Fort (2005). Maîtres des Amériques : hommage aux artistes précolombiens : la collection Dora et Paul Janssen. Bruxelles: Fonds Mercator. ISBN 9789085865797.
- Sabiha Al-Kemir (2006). From Cordoba to Samarkand Masterpieces from the Museum of Islamic Art in Doha, 2006, Musée des arts islamiques, Doha et musée du Louvre, Paris (in English and French). Paris: Musée des arts islamiques, Doha et musée du Louvre/Éditions 5 Continents. p. 216. ISBN 88-7439-345-8.
- Herman Burssens; Marnix Neerman (2006). African Faces - Un hommage au masque africain (in Dutch and French). Brussels: Editions Lannoo. p. 312. ISBN 9789020982527.
- Oliver Wick; Antje Denner (2009). Visual Encounters Africa, Oceania and Modern Art, 2009, Beyeler Foundation, Suisse. Basel: Beyeler Foundation/Christoph Merian Verlag. p. 41. ISBN 978-3856164829.
- Black Seat. Paris: galerie Yann Ferrandin. 2010. ISBN 9782953435719.
- Sophie Makariou; Marie Fradet; Frédéric Viaux (2012). Les Arts de l'Islam au Musee du Louvre. Paris: Musée du Louvre/Hazan. p. 46. ISBN 9782754106207.
- Évelyne Lepage (2013). Formes & façons dans le patrimoine du val de Bagnes (in French and English). Milan: Éditions 5 Continents. p. 141. ISBN 9788874395460.
- Kevin Conru; Klaus-Jochen Krüger; Ingrid Heermann; Bart Van Bussel; Hughes Dubois (2013). L'art de l'archipel Bismark. Milan: Éditions 5 Continents. p. 327. ISBN 9788874396443.
- Monique Crick; Helen Loveday; Estelle Niklès van Osselt (2015). Alfred Baur : pionnier et collectionneur. Milan: Fondation Baur, Musée des arts d'Extrême-Orient/ Éditions 5 continents. p. 455. ISBN 9788874396948.
- Carpenter, Bruce; Caroline Dubois; Hughes Dubois (2018). Borobudur under the full moon. Photographs by Caroline Dubois and Hughes Dubois. Brussels: Éditions de l'Ouvert, Belgique. p. 197. ISBN 9782930043005.
- Jérôme Ghesquière; Sophie Makariou (2018). L'Asie des photographes. Paris: Musée Guimet-Réunion des musées nationaux-Grand Palais. p. 245. ISBN 9782711870967.
- Annie Caubet (2018). Idols, the power of images. Venise: Fondazione Giancarlo Ligabue/Skira, Milan. p. 287. ISBN 9788857238852..
- Marie-Amélie Carlier (2021). Art du moyen-âge en Europe (in French and English). Bruxelles: Brimo de Laroussilhe. p. 172. ISBN 9782955592533.
