= Qiu Menghuang =

Chinese television presenter

- 邱孟煌
- Born: December 12, 1968 (age 57); Shantou, Guangdong, China
- Other name: A Qiu (阿丘)
- Education: Guangxi Teachers Training College
- Occupation: Host
- Years active: 2003–2020
- Television: China Central Television

Chinese name
- Chinese: 邱孟煌
Transcriptions
Standard Mandarin
- Hanyu Pinyin: Qiū Mènghuáng

Qiu Menghuang (Chinese: 邱孟煌; pinyin: Qiū Mènghuáng, born 12 December 1968), also known as his stage name A Qiu (阿丘), is a Chinese television presenter and blogger.

Qiu Menghuang was born in Shantou, Guangdong Province on 12 December 1968, his parents were both soldiers. Qiu's mother was a Returned Malaysian Chinese. He was admitted to Guangxi Teachers Training College (present-day Nanning Normal University), majoring political economy. After his graduation in 1989, he was assigned to Nanning Cotton Textile Printing and Dyeing Factory, as a political cadre of labor union. In 1992, he became a playwright in Nanning Art Theater.

Qiu joined China Central Television (CCTV) as a television presenter on 21 April 2003. He had hosted several programs, including Society in the News (社会记录), The Elite (人物新周刊), and Daily stories (天天故事汇).

In November 2019, there were rumors that Qiu had been expelled from CCTV. Qiu denied this.

During the COVID-19 pandemic in China, on 26 February 2020, Qiu posted on Sina Weibo: "Even though the stereotype of 'sick man of Asia' has been shattered for over a century, can we be more gentle and apologetic in our tone, humbly put on some face masks and give a bow to the world and say 'sorry for the mess'?" The tweet was subsequently deleted, however, many Chinese social media users accused Qiu of "betraying China" and "providing a moral basis for the global anti-Chinese behavior". On 4 March, CCTV announced that Qiu had been "completely banned from hosting shows".
