= Tang–Tibet Treaty Inscription =

Pillar inscription at Jokhang Temple

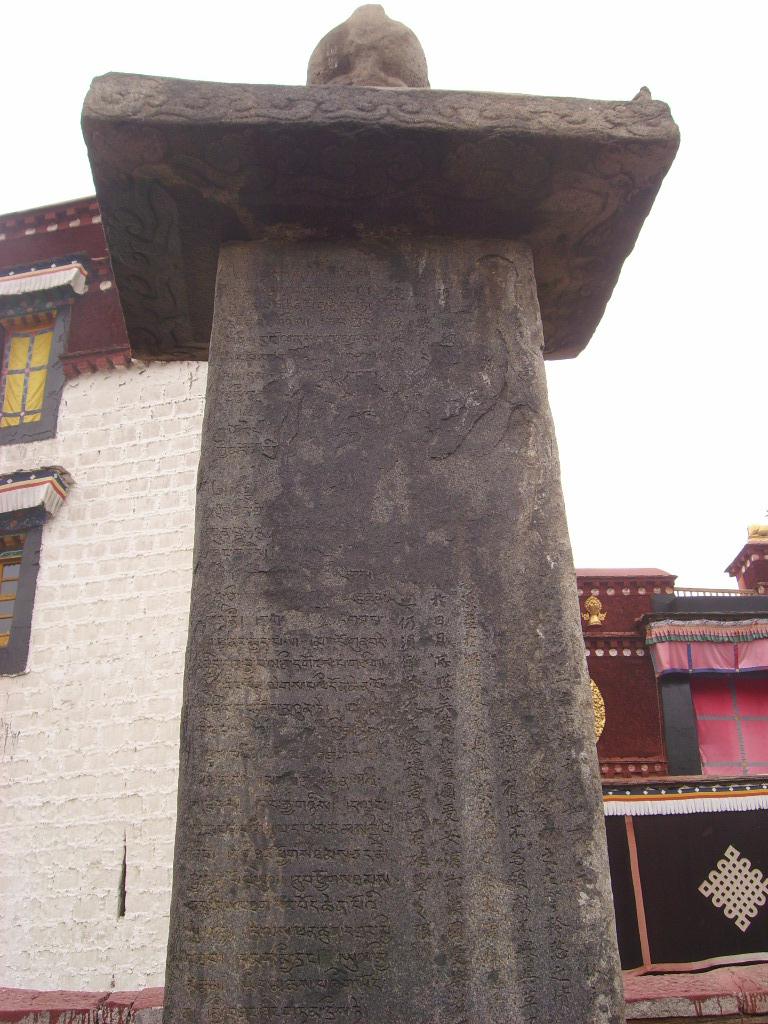
- Tang-Tibetan Empire Treaty Inscription
- Created: 823
- Present location: 29.6531°N 91.1310°E

The Tang - Tibetan Empire Treaty Inscription (Tibetan: གཙུག་ལག་ཁང་མདུན་གྱི་རྡོ་རིངས་, Wylie: gtsug lag khang mdun gyi rdo rings; simplified Chinese: 唐蕃会盟碑; traditional Chinese: 唐蕃會盟碑; pinyin: Táng-Bō Huìméng Bēi) is a stone pillar standing outside the Jokhang Temple in Lhasa, Tibet Autonomous Region, China. The inscription is written in both Tibetan and Classical Chinese, concerning the Changqing Treaty between the Tibetan Empire and Tang Empire in A.D. 821/823. Amy Heller's book Tibetan Art describes it as one of the most important treaties between the Tang and Tibetan Empire. Inscription states the relationship of Tang and Tibetan Empire as uncle and nephew of same family.

Chinese name
- Traditional Chinese: 唐蕃會盟碑
- Simplified Chinese: 唐蕃会盟碑
- Literal meaning: Tang-Tibet Alliance Monument
Transcriptions
Standard Mandarin
- Hanyu Pinyin: Táng-Bō Huìméng Bēi

Tibetan name
- Tibetan: གཙུག་ལག་ཁང་མདུན་གྱི་རྡོ་རིངས་
- Literal meaning: The stele in front of the Jokhang Temple
Transcriptions
- Wylie: gtsug lag khang mdun gyi rdo rings

== Reading ==
- Old Book of Tang
