= List of Chinese treaty ports =

In the 19th and early 20th century, these were the treaty ports in China.

== I. Northern ports ==
Port	Treaty	Open Date	Closed Date	Chinese Population
Niuzhuang, in the imperial Shengjing province, in Manchuria	in accordance with the British Treaty of Tientsin, 1858;	custom office opened 9 May 1864;		74,000
Qinhuangdao, in Zhili province, also in Manchuria	in accordance with an imperial decree, 31 March 1898	opened 15 December 1901		5,000
Tianjin, also in Zhili	in accordance with the British and French Peking Conventions, 1860	opened May, 1861		750,000
Yantai, in Shandong	in accordance with British and French Treaty of Tientsin, 1858;	opened March, 1862		100,000
Jiaozhou, also in Shandong	German Convention 6 March 1898	opened 1 July 1899.		

== II. Yangtze River ports ==
Port	Treaty	Open Date	Closed Date	Chinese Population
Chongqing, in Sichuan province		opened November 1890		702,000
Yichang, in Hubei	in accordance with Chefoo Convention, 1876	opened 1 April 1877		50,000
Shashi, also in Hubei	Treaty of Shimonoseki, 1895	opened 1 October 1876		C85,000
Changsha, in Hunan		opened 1 July 1904		230,000
Yuezhou, also in Hunan	imperial decree of 31 March 1898	opened 13 November 1899		20,000
Hankou, also in Hubei	provincial regulations, 1861	opened January 1862		530,000
Jiujiang, in Jiangxi	same regulations	opened January 1862		36,000
Wuhu, in Anhui	Chefoo Convention, 1876	opened 1 April 1877		123,000
Nanjing, in Jiangsu	French Treaty of Tientsin, 1858	opened 1 May 1899		261,000
Zhenjiang, also in Jiangsu	British Treaty, 1858	opened April, 1861		170,000

== III. Central ports ==
Port	Treaty	Open Date	Closed Date	Chinese Population
Shanghai, in Jiangsu province	Treaty of Nanking, 1842	opened officially 17 November 1843		651,000
Suzhou, also in Jiangsu	Treaty of Shimonoseki	opened 26 September 1896		500,000
Hangzhou, in Zhejiang	Shimonoseki Treaty	opened 26 September 1896		350,000
Ningbo, in Zhejiang	Shimonoseki Treaty	opened 26 September 1896		500,000
Wenzhou, also in Zhejiang	Chefoo Convention, 1876	opened April, 1877		80,000

== IV. South Coast ports ==
Port	Treaty	Open Date	Closed Date	Chinese Population
Sandu'ao, in Fujian province	imperial decree of 31 March 1898	opened 1 May 1899		8000
Fuzhou, also in Fujian	Nan-king Treaty, 1842	opened July, 1861		624,000
Amoy, also in Fujian	Nan-king Treaty 1842;	opened April, 1862		114,000
Guangzhou (Canton), in Guangdong province	Nanking Treaty, 1842	opened October 1859		900,000
Kowloon, also in Guangdong;		opened April, 1887		
Lappa, again in Guangdong		opened 27 June 1871		
Kongmoon, in Guangdong		opened 7 March 1904;		55,000
Sanshui, also in Guangdong	Anglo-Chinese Convention, 4 February 1897	opened 4 June 1897		5000
Shantou, also in Guangdong (customs house on Mayu Island)	English, French, and American Treaty of Tientsin, 1858	opened January 1860;		65,000
Wu-chou, in Kwang-si province	same convention	opened 4 June 1897;		59,000
Kiung-chou (Hoy-hou), on Hainan Island in Guangdong	French, and English Treaties of Tientsin, 1858	opened April, 1876		38,000
Pak-hoi, also in Guangdong	Chefoo Convention, 1876	opened April, 1877;		20,000

== V. Frontier ports ==
Port	Treaty	Open Date	Closed Date	Population
Longzhou, in Guangxi province	French Treaty, 25 June 1887	opened 1 June 1899		12,000
Mengzi, in Yunnan	French Treaty, 1887	opened 30 April 1889		15,000
Simao, also in Yunnan	French Convention, 1895; British, 1896	opened 2 January 1897		15,000
Tengyue, also in Yunnan	Convention of 4 February 1897	opened 8 May 1902;		10,000
Yadong, in (?) Tibet		opened 1 May 1894		
Nanning, also in Guangxi	opened by imperial decree, 3 February 1899, but had not (yet?) a customs office.			

According to the customs statistics, 6,917,000 Chinese inhabited the treaty ports in 1906. The foreign population included 1837 firms and 38,597 persons, mainly Europeans (British 9356, French 2189, German 1939, Portuguese 3184, Italians 786, Spaniards 389, Belgians 297, Austrians 236, Russians 273, Danes 209, Dutch 225, Norwegians 185, Swedes 135), Americans 3447, Brazilians 16, Japanese 15,548, Koreans 47, subjects of non-treaty powers 236.

== See also ==
- Unequal treaties
- List of treaties of China before the People's Republic
- Century of humiliation
- Foreign concessions in China
- Sick man of Asia
