= Sick man of Europe =

Geopolitical designation

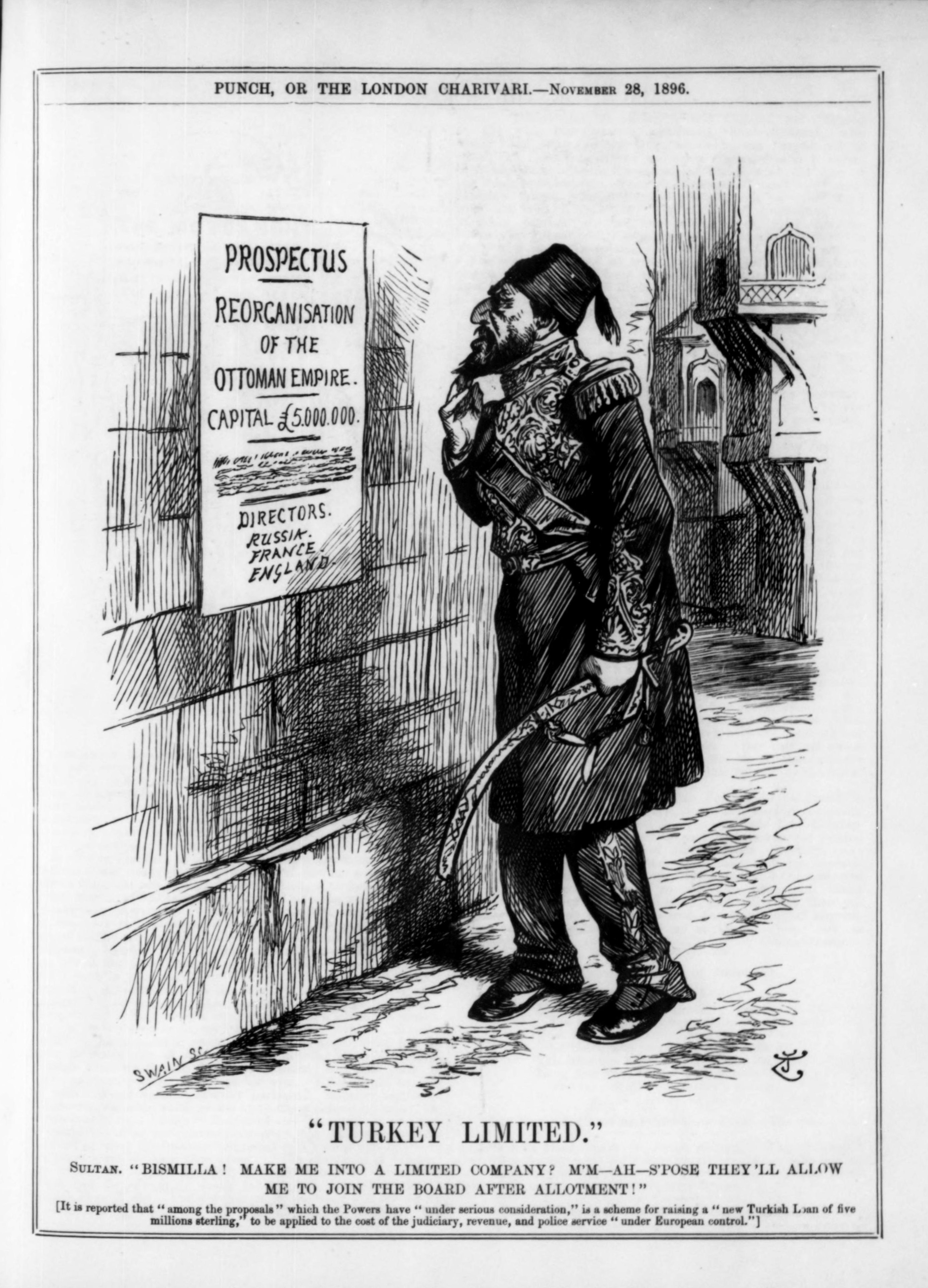
Caricature from Punch, dated June 6, 1896. It shows Sultan Abdul Hamid II in front of a poster that announces the reorganization of the Ottoman Empire. The empire's value is estimated at £5 million (£695 million in 2024). Russia, France and "England" (a synecdoche for the United Kingdom) are listed as the directors of the reorganisation. The caricature satirized the impoverished state of the Ottoman economy at the time.

"Sick man of Europe" was a term allegedly first used by Nicholas I of Russia to describe the Ottoman Empire, which entered a state of economic and political decline towards the end of the 19th century. The label has been applied to other countries, including the United Kingdom in the 1960s, and Germany in the late 1990s to early 2000s.

== Origin ==
The decline of the Ottoman Empire during the 19th century gave rise to the so-called Eastern Question, in which other European states sought to take advantage by expanding into its territories. It has been attributed to Nicholas I of Russia (r. 1825–1855), who allegedly used the phrase during a meeting in September 1833 with Austrian chancellor Metternich, although the latter claimed to have rejected this characterisation.

=== Crimean War ===
British statesman John Russell in 1853, in the run-up to the Crimean War, reported that Nicholas I of Russia described the Ottoman Empire as "a sick man—a very sick man", a "man who has fallen into a state of decrepitude", and a "sick man ... gravely ill".

There has been some degree of debate about the source of the quotation, which often relies on historical documents held or communicated personally. Historian Harold Temperley (1879–1939) gave the date for the first conversation as 9 January 1853, like Goldfrank. According to Temperley, Seymour in a private conversation had to push the Tsar to be more specific about the Ottoman Empire. Eventually, the Tsar stated,

Turkey seems to be falling to pieces, the fall will be a great misfortune. It is very important that England and Russia should come to a perfectly good understanding ... and that neither should take any decisive step of which the other is not apprized [sic].

Closer to the attributed phrase, the Tsar stated,

We have a sick man on our hands, a man gravely ill, it will be a great misfortune if one of these days he slips through our hands, especially before the necessary arrangements are made.

Different interpretations existed between the two countries on the "Eastern Question" by the time of the Crimean War. The British Ambassador G. H. Seymour agreed with Tsar Nicholas's diagnosis, but he very deferentially disagreed with the Tsar's recommended treatment of the patient; he responded,

Your Majesty is so gracious that you will allow me to make one further observation. Your Majesty says the man is sick; it is very true; but your Majesty will deign to excuse me if I remark, that it is the part of the generous and strong man to treat with gentleness the sick and feeble man.

Temperley then asserts,

The 'sickliness' of Turkey obsessed Nicholas during his reign. What he really said was omitted in the Blue Book from a mistaken sense of decorum. He said not the 'sick man' but the "bear dies … the bear is dying … you may give him musk but even musk will not long keep him alive."

Christopher de Bellaigue argued that neither Nicholas nor Seymour completed the epithet with the prepositional phrase "of Europe".

The first appearance of the phrase "sick man of Europe" appears in The New York Times (12 May 1860):

The condition of Austria at the present moment is not less threatening in itself, though less alarming for the peace of the world, than was the condition of Turkey when the Tsar Nicholas invited England to draw up with him the last will and testament of the 'sick man of Europe.' It is, indeed, hardly within the range of probability that another twelvemonth should pass over the House of Habsburg without bringing upon the Austrian Empire a catastrophe unmatched in modern history since the downfall of Poland.

The author of this article can be seen to be using the term to point to a second "sick man" of Europe, the Habsburg monarchy.

=== World War One ===
Later, this view led the Allies in World War I to underestimate the Ottoman Empire, leading in part to the disastrous Gallipoli campaign. However, the "sick man" eventually collapsed after defeat in the Middle Eastern theatre of World War I.

== Post-World War I usage ==
After the demise of the Ottoman Empire, writers have described many countries as the "sick men" of Europe or the Old World.

=== France ===
During the 1950s, France was characterized as the "sick man of Europe", due to a combination of economic issues and a fading optimism since the country was reestablished after World War II. In 1953, Paul Reynaud described France as such to the National Assembly.

A 2007 report by Morgan Stanley referred to France as the "new sick man of Europe". This label was reaffirmed in January 2014 by European newspapers such as The Guardian and Frankfurter Allgemeine Zeitung. They justified this with France's high unemployment, weak economic growth and poor industrial output. In 2025, BBC InDepth Paris correspondent Hugh Schofield wrote that France was at risk at becoming the new Sick Man of Europe.

=== Germany ===
In the late 1990s, Germany was often labeled with this term because of its economic problems, especially due to the costs of German reunification after 1990, which were estimated to amount to over €1.5 trillion (statement of Freie Universität Berlin). It continued to be used in the early 2000s, and as Germany slipped into recession in 2003. In contrast, a 2016 article by The Guardian described the German economy under Angela Merkel as a "revival" from the country's previous "sick man" status. However, when Germany was experiencing economic issues again in the 2020s, concerns about the "sick man" characterisation reemerged, with Kiel Institute President Moritz Schularick saying: "If Germany does not want to become the 'sick man of Europe' once again, it must now courageously turn its attention to the growth sectors of tomorrow instead of fearfully spending billions to preserve yesterday's energy-intensive industries."

=== Italy ===
In 1972, PSDI politician Luigi Preti wrote a book titled Sick Italy (Italia malata). In it, he says that Italy was at risk of becoming "the sick man of Europe who has proved unable to keep in step as soon as he reached the first milestone on the road to well‐being".

In May 2005, this title was again attributed to Italy, with The Economist describing it as "the real sick man of Europe". This refers to Italy's structural and political difficulties thought to inhibit economic reforms to relaunch economic growth. In 2018, Italy was again referred to as the "sick man of Europe" following post-election deadlock. In 2008, in an opinion piece criticizing the country's approach to economic reform, The Daily Telegraph also used the term to describe Italy, as did a CNBC op-ed in 2020.

=== Russia ===
The Russian Empire in 1917 was described as the "Sick Man of Europe" in an edition of The New York Times from that year. In the 1917 article by Charles Richard Crane, the illness metaphor is used more directly, with the empire described as "Suffering From Overdose of Exaggerated Modernism in Socialist Reform Ideas", and "the danger for the patient lay in the fact that too many quacks and ignorant specialists were contending for the right to be admitted to the bedside and administer nostrums."

Post-Soviet Russia has also been referred to as such in the 2007 book Kremlin Rising: Vladimir Putin's Russia and the End of Revolution by Peter Baker and Susan Glasser, and by Mark Steyn in his 2006 book America Alone: The End of the World as We Know It.

In the aftermath of the Wagner Group rebellion during the Russian invasion of Ukraine (and Vladimir Putin's perceived weakness in confronting it), political scientist Aleksandar Đokić said in 2023 that the "sick man of Europe" moniker "seem[ed] fitting for Putin’s Russia". While acknowledging the term itself to be simplistic, Đokić stated that:

"The poetic justice of the imperialistic, orientalising and commonly overused term coming back to haunt its place of origin aside, Putin’s Russia has decidedly found itself in a military, economic, political, demographic, and even conceptual dead end."

=== United Kingdom ===
Throughout the late 1960s and 1970s, the United Kingdom was sometimes characterized as the "sick man of Europe", first by commentators, and later at home by critics of the third Wilson/Callaghan ministry due to industrial strife and poor economic performance compared with other European countries. Some observers consider this era to have started with the devaluation of the pound in 1967, culminating with the so-called Winter of Discontent of 1978–79. At different points throughout the decade, numerous countries such as Italy, Spain, Portugal, France, and Greece were cited by the American business press as being "on the verge of sickness" as well.

In the summer of 2017, the United Kingdom was again referred to as the "sick man of Europe" due to the immediate impact of the EU referendum results. The term was used frequently by the early 2020s with regards to the economic effects of Brexit, ongoing industrial action in the public sector, leadership turmoil within the Conservative party, and the cost of living crisis. As of June 2023, the label is still frequently applied to the United Kingdom as inflation and price increases continue to generate economic uncertainty within the country.

The term was also more literally applied during the COVID-19 pandemic after a new strain of coronavirus, the Alpha variant, led to a number of countries closing their borders to UK air travel.

=== Other uses ===
Swedish diplomat and former Prime Minister Carl Bildt once referred to Serbia under the rule of Slobodan Milošević as a candidate for the new "sick man of Europe" in 1997. This was due to political instability in Yugoslavia and its former territories caused by the Yugoslav Wars which rocked the Balkan region from 1991 until 2001.

In 2007, The Economist described Portugal as "a new sick man of Europe".

In July 2009, the pejorative was given by EurActiv to Greece in view of the 2008 Greek riots, rising unemployment, and political corruption.

In spring 2011, Eurozine suggested that the European Union was the "sick man of Europe" by entitling an event focusing on the Eurozone crisis, "The EU: the real sick man of Europe?"

In 2015 and 2016, Finland was called the "sick man of Europe" due to its recession and lacklustre growth, in a time when virtually all other European countries had recovered from the Great Recession.

== See also ==
- Decline and modernization of the Ottoman Empire
- Ottoman decline thesis
- PIGS (economics)
- Sick man of Asia
