= Sick man of Asia =

Geopolitical designation

The phrase "Sick man of Asia" (Chinese: 亞洲病夫; pinyin: Yàzhōu bìngfū), or "Sick man of East Asia" (Chinese: 東亞病夫; pinyin: Dōngyà bìngfū) first referred to Qing China in the late 19th and early 20th centuries which, experiencing internal divisions and social upheaval at the time, was taken advantage of by the great powers. It originates in a play on the concept of a "sick man of Europe". It was then applied to the Philippines in the 20th century during the dictatorship of Ferdinand Marcos and the 1997 Asian financial crisis.

== Early usage ==
The term "sick man of Europe" was initially coined in 1853 by Tsar Nicholas I to refer to the Ottoman Empire, which was then in a state of decline. After World War I the phrase was applied to various European countries including France, Italy, the United Kingdom, Spain and Germany.

One of the earliest instances of the term "sick man" being applied to China was in the January 5, 1863 edition of the Daily News in an article about the ongoing Taiping Rebellion. That article was reprinted in the January 7, 1863 edition of the Belfast Morning News under the title "The Supposed 'Sick Man' in China."

In 1895, after Japan defeated China in the First Sino-Japanese War, Chinese writer Yan Fu described China as a "sick man" (病夫) in an article titled "On the Origin of Strength" (原強) in his newspaper Zhibao, helping popularize the term among Chinese intellectuals. According to Yan:

A nation is like a human. If an individual is not physically active, the body will be weak. If a person is active physically, the body will be strong. This is common sense. How about a sick man? If he wants to transform his sick body into a strong one overnight, he is bound to overdo. Pursuing this strategy to become strong will actually speed up his death. Does today's China look like a sick man?

Yan contended that to become a strong nation, the Chinese people must improve their physical strength, intelligence, and moral values. He criticized opium smoking and foot binding, the latter based on the idea that only a healthy mother could produce healthy children.

In 1896, the Shanghai newspaper North China Daily News published an article stating: "There are four sick people of the world – Turkey, Persia, China, Morocco ... China is the Sick Man of the East." Around then, the phrase was adopted by Chinese thinkers who aimed to reform the Qing government, among them Liang Qichao and Kang Youwei. According to Jui-sung Yang, professor at the National Chengchi University, although Chinese intellectuals such as Zeng Pu initially agreed with the description of China as a "sick man", the term gradually became seen as a way in which the Westerners were mocking, humiliating, and insulting China.

Beginning at the turn of the 20th century, Chinese nationalist intellectuals and activists adapted the trope of China as the "sick man of Asia" to advocate for Chinese to cure their country by transforming both physical health and political health.

== Contemporary usage ==
One of the most prominent 20th-century uses of the phrase was in the 1972 Hong Kong film Fist of Fury starring Bruce Lee, which was released across Asia. According to Chinese writer Chang Ping, that film, and others, combined with Chinese education about its "century of humiliation", have linked the term "sick man" with Chinese colonial history, making it a symbol of foreign bullying.

Recently, the term has been applied to countries other than China. For example, an April 2009 article entitled "The Sick Man of Asia" refers to Japan, not China.

The Philippines has also been referred to as the sick man of Asia during the time of Ferdinand Marcos as president in the 1970s until his ouster in 1986. The country managed to rise economically afterwards, where in 2013, under the presidency of Benigno Aquino III, the country was dubbed by the World Bank as Asia's Rising Tiger. In 2014, the Japan External Trade Organization survey showed "the Philippines as the second most profitable among ASEAN-5 countries, next to Thailand," formally abolishing the "sick man" status of the Philippines. However, during the presidency of Rodrigo Duterte, several commentators argued that due to the slow growth of the economy and the administration's handling of the COVID-19 pandemic, the Philippines had restored its "sick man" status.

During the COVID-19 pandemic, India began to be referred to as the "sick man of Asia" as a double entendre after its government's poor management of the pandemic, with significant loss of life, wide disease expression, the eruption of the delta variant, and substantial economic difficulties.

Due to continued political and economic instability, countries like Myanmar and Pakistan have been described as the "sick man of Asia". For decades, Myanmar has been enduring various military dictatorships, prolonged civil wars, and international isolation which has attracted such moniker for Myanmar. In 2022, after the removal of then Prime Minister Imran Khan in a no-confidence motion, one op-ed article used the term to refer to Pakistan amid its economic crisis.

In 2026, Financial Times referred to Thailand as the "sick man of Asia". Anutin Charnvirakul, leader of Bhumjaithai Party, promised to "cure" the nation as part of the party's campaign prior to 2026 Thai general election.

=== 2020 Wall Street Journal article ===
On February 3, 2020, The Wall Street Journal published an opinion piece by Walter Russell Mead regarding the COVID-19 epidemic entitled, China is the Real Sick Man of Asia. On February 19, Chinese Foreign Ministry spokesperson Geng Shuang issued a statement revoking the press credentials of three Wall Street Journal reporters and ordering their expulsion. The statement said the WSJ article "slandered" China's efforts in fighting COVID-19 and "used such [a] racially discriminatory title, triggering indignation and condemnation among the Chinese people and the international community." The Wall Street Journal editorial board then published a piece noting that while the term "sick man" may be seen as "insensitive", the Chinese government's actions were intended to divert public attention from its management of the coronavirus or in retaliation for the U.S. government designating Chinese state-run media operating in the U.S. as foreign missions.

== See also ==
- Yellow peril
- Anti-China
- Orientalism
- Century of humiliation
- Chinese concession of Incheon
- Criticism of Qing dynasty's economic performance
- Foreign concessions in China
- Treaty ports
- List of Chinese treaty ports
- PIGS (economics)
- Scramble for China
- Sick man of Europe
- Unequal treaties
