= Century of humiliation =

Era in Chinese history (c. 1839–1940s)

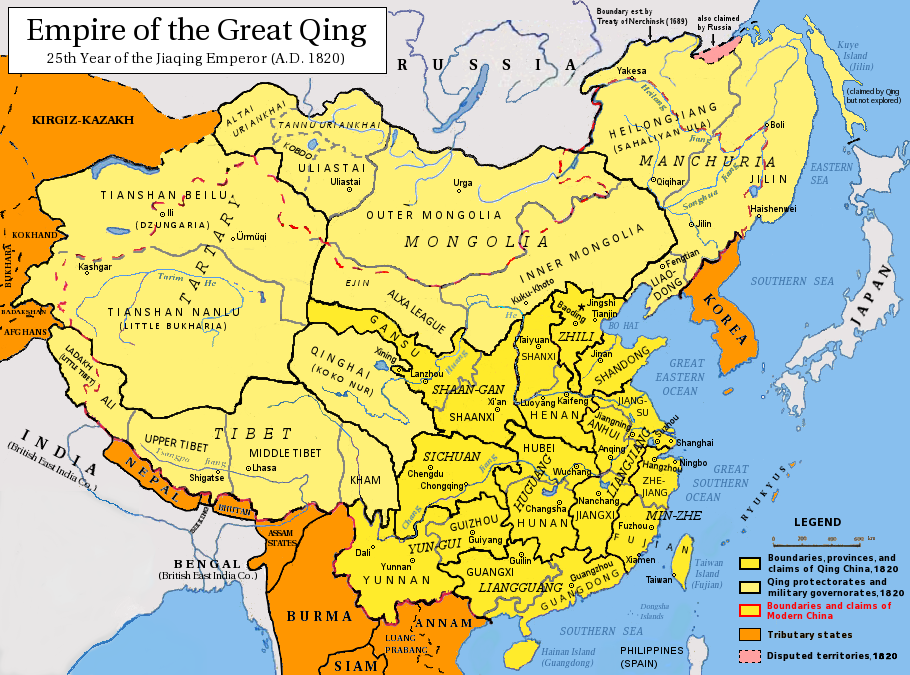
- Qing territory c. 1820, with provinces in yellow, military governorates and protectorates in light yellow, tributary states in orange
- Traditional Chinese: 百年國恥
- Simplified Chinese: 百年国耻
- Literal meaning: one hundred years (of) national shame
Transcriptions
Standard Mandarin
- Hanyu Pinyin: bǎinián guóchǐ
- Bopomofo: ㄅㄞˇ ㄋㄧㄢˊ ㄍㄨㄛˊ ㄔˇ
- Gwoyeu Romatzyh: baenian gwochyy
- Wade–Giles: pai^{3}-nien^{2} kuo^{2}-ch ʻih^{3}
- IPA: [pàɪ.njɛ̌n kwǒ.ʈʂʰɻ̩̀]
Yue: Cantonese
- Yale Romanization: baaknìhn gwokchí
- Jyutping: baak3 nin4 gwok3 ci2
- IPA: [pak̚˧.nin˩ kʷɔk̚˧.tsʰi˧˥]

The century of humiliation (simplified Chinese: 百年国耻; traditional Chinese: 百年國恥; pinyin: bǎinián guóchǐ) is a Chinese historiographical concept for a period in history beginning with the end of the First Opium War (1839–1842), and terminating with the establishment of the People's Republic of China in 1949 under the Chinese Communist Party (CCP). The century-long period is typified by the decline, defeat and political fragmentation of the Qing dynasty and the subsequent Republic of China, which led to demoralizing foreign intervention, annexation and subjugation of China by Western powers, Russia, and Japan.

The characterization of the period as a "humiliation" arose with an atmosphere of Chinese nationalism following China's defeat in the First Sino-Japanese War of 1894–1895 and the subsequent events including the scramble for concessions in the late 1890s. Since then the idea of national humiliation became a focus of discussions among many Chinese writers and scholars, although they differed somewhat in their understandings of national humiliation; ordinary scholars and constitutionalists also had different understanding of their home country from the anti-Qing revolutionaries in the late Qing period. The idea of national humiliation was also mentioned in late Qing textbooks.

Both the Kuomintang and Chinese Communist Party popularized the characterization in the 1920s, protesting the unequal treaties and loss of Chinese territory to foreign empires. During the 1930s and 1940s, the term became common due to the Japanese invasion of China proper. In 1943, the major western Allied nations of World War II, at the direction of the United States, agreed to revoke all unequal treaties they signed with the Qing government, officially ending the Treaty System along with foreign extraterritoriality, political and trade privileges, making foreign nationals subject to Chinese laws. Although formal treaty provisions were ended, the epoch remains central to concepts of Chinese nationalism, and the term is widely used in both political rhetoric and popular culture.

== Foreign imperialism ==
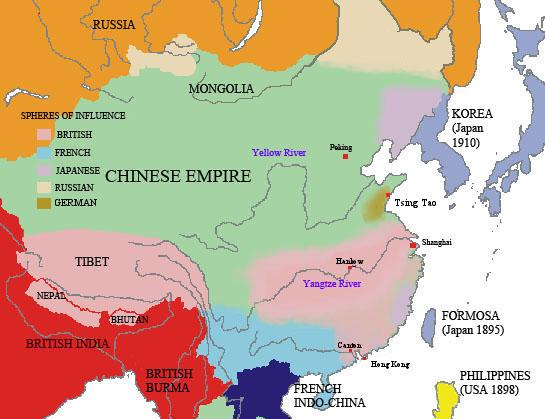
Spheres of influence in China during the late Qing dynasty

During the 19th and 20th centuries, foreign powers practiced imperialism in China through the imposition of unequal treaties, opening of treaty ports, and establishment of foreign concessions and leased territories. Starting with the 1842 Treaty of Nanking following the Qing dynasty's defeat by Britain in the First Opium War, various foreign powers, including Britain, France, the United States, Russia, Germany, and Japan, forced China to concede sovereignty and in turn gained territorial, economic, and legal privileges from China. Chinese historians widely include China's subjugation to foreign powers as part of the "century of humiliation."

Within treaty ports, foreign powers controlled enclaves, known as concessions; and gained leases on territories that operated as de facto colonies. Foreign citizens in these areas were granted extraterritoriality, exempting them from Chinese legal jurisdiction in favor of their own consular courts. Foreign powers also maintained their own police forces, military garrisons, and independent taxation systems. The Scramble for China in the late 19th century saw a rapid acceleration of this process, as major powers carved out exclusive spheres of influence across the country, a trend only partially checked by the United States' Open Door Policy.

The foreign presence led to major changes to China's economy and society. Major treaty ports, particularly in Shanghai and Tianjin, became hubs of industrialization, Western education, and international trade. They introduced Western manufacturing, banking systems, and cultural practices to the region. At the same time, the loss of national sovereignty, along with social and legal inequalities between foreigners and natives, sparked Chinese resistance to foreign imperialism resulting in events such as the Boxer Rebellion and May Fourth movement.

The framework of unequal treaties slowly began to diminish after the establishment of the Republic of China. Amidst the Second Sino-Japanese War and World War II in the 1940s, most foreign powers relinquished their extraterritorial rights and concessions. The Chinese Communist Party abolished the remaining concessions after prevailing in the Chinese Civil War, although the final vestiges of foreign imperialism remained until the handover of Hong Kong in 1997 and the handover of Macau in 1999. The legacy of this period has greatly shaped China and is reflected today in its foreign policy, national identity, and economy.

== Domestic conflicts ==
Soldiers of the Eight-Nation Alliance in the Forbidden City following the defeat of the Boxer Rebellion, 1900

=== Taiping Rebellion ===
The Taiping Rebellion (1850–1864) was a civil war in late imperial China fought between the ruling Qing dynasty and the rebelling Taiping Heavenly Kingdom. It was the deadliest civil war in history and the second-deadliest conflict in history overall. Estimates of the war's death toll range from 20–30 million, around 5–10% of the total Chinese population at the time, to 73–100 million, around 25% of the population. The Rebellion is widely considered to be the most important event in 19th-century Chinese history, and although the kingdom was defeated, the victory came at a great cost to the Qing dynasty's economy and political stability.

The uprising was led by Hong Xiuquan, an ethnic Hakka who, after a series of visions, proclaimed himself to be the younger brother of Jesus Christ. Hong sought the religious conversion of the Han people to his syncretic version of Christianity, as well as the political overthrow of the Qing dynasty, and a general transformation of the mechanisms of state. Rather than supplanting China's ruling class, the Taiping rebels sought to entirely upend the country's social order. The Taiping Heavenly Kingdom in Nanjing seized control of significant portions of southern China. At its peak, the Heavenly Kingdom ruled over a population of nearly 30 million.

For more than a decade, Taiping armies occupied and fought across much of the mid- and lower Yangtze valley, ultimately devolving into civil war. It was the largest war in China since the Ming–Qing transition, involving most of Central and Southern China. It ranks as one of the bloodiest wars in human history, the bloodiest civil war, and the largest conflict of the 19th century, comparable to World War I in terms of deaths. Thirty million people fled the conquered regions to foreign settlements or other parts of China. The war was characterized by extreme brutality on both sides. Taiping soldiers carried out widespread massacres of Manchus, the ethnic minority of the ruling Imperial House of Aisin-Gioro. Meanwhile, the Qing government also engaged in massacres, most notably against the civilian population of Nanjing.

Weakened severely by internal conflicts following the failure of the campaign against Beijing (1853–1855) and an attempted coup in September and October 1856, the Taiping rebels were defeated by decentralised provincial armies such as the Xiang Army organised and commanded by Zeng Guofan. After moving down the Yangtze River and recapturing the strategic city of Anqing, Zeng's forces besieged Nanjing during May 1862. After two more years, on June 1, 1864, Hong Xiuquan died during the siege, caused from the consumption of weeds in the palace grounds as well as suspicions of poison. Nanjing fell barely a month later.

The 14-year civil war, along with the internal and external conflicts of the Opium Wars and the Boxer Rebellion, weakened the Qing dynasty's grasp on central China. The Taiping rebellion prompted the government's initially successful "Self-Strengthening Movement", but continued social and religious unrest exacerbated ethnic disputes and accelerated the rise of provincial powers. The Warlord Era, the loss of central control after the establishment of the Republic of China, would begin in earnest in 1912.

=== Xinhai Revolution ===
The 1911 Revolution, also known as the Xinhai Revolution or Hsinhai Revolution, culminated in the end of China's last imperial dynasty, the Qing dynasty, and led to the establishment of the Republic of China (ROC). The revolution was the culmination of a decade of agitation, revolts, and uprisings. Its success marked the end of Chinese monarchy, the 267-year reign of the Qing, over two millennia of imperial rule in China, and the beginning of China's early republican era.

The Qing had long struggled to reform the government and resist foreign aggression, but conservatives in the Qing court opposed the program of reforms after 1900 as too radical and reformers considered it too slow. Several factions, including underground anti-Qing groups, revolutionaries in exile, reformers who wanted to save the monarchy by modernizing it, and activists across the country debated how or whether to overthrow the Qing dynasty.

The flashpoint came on 10 October 1911 with the Wuchang Uprising, an armed rebellion by members of the New Army. Similar revolts then broke out spontaneously around the country, and revolutionaries in every province renounced the Qing dynasty. On 1 November 1911, the Qing court appointed Yuan Shikai (leader of the Beiyang Army) as prime minister, and he began negotiations with the revolutionaries.

In Nanjing, revolutionary forces created a provisional coalition government. On 1 January 1912, the Advisory Council declared the establishment of the Republic of China, with Sun Yat-sen, leader of the Tongmenghui, as President of the Republic of China. A brief civil war between the North and the South ended in compromise. Sun resigned in favor of Yuan, who would become president of the new national government if he could secure the abdication of the Qing emperor. The edict of abdication of the six-year-old Xuantong Emperor was promulgated on 12 February 1912. Yuan was sworn in as president on 10 March 1912.

In December 1915, Yuan restored the monarchy and proclaimed himself the Hongxian Emperor, but the move was met with strong opposition by the population and the Army, leading to his abdication in March 1916 and the Republic's reinstatement. Yuan's failure to consolidate a legitimate central government before his death in June 1916 led to decades of political division and warlordism, including an attempt at imperial restoration of the Qing dynasty.

The name "Xinhai Revolution" derives from the traditional Chinese calendar, where "Xinhai" (辛亥) is the label corresponding to 1911 according to the sexagenary cycle. The governments of both the Republic of China and the People's Republic of China consider themselves the legitimate successors to the 1911 Revolution and honor the ideals of the revolution, including nationalism, republicanism, modernization of China, and national unity. 10 October is the National Day of the Republic of China on Taiwan, and the Anniversary of the 1911 Revolution in China.

=== Warlord Era ===
Main military coalitions of Chinese warlords in 1925

The Warlord Era was the period in the history of the Republic of China between 1916 and 1928, when control of the country was divided between rival military cliques of the Beiyang Army and other regional factions. It began after the death of Yuan Shikai, the President of China after the Xinhai Revolution. He took power by leveraging his position as Prime Minister of the Qing Dynasty to force the Emperor’s abdication in exchange for the presidency. He quickly abandoned his promises of reform, working to dismantle the parliament and consolidate military power. As a result, following Yuan's death on 6 June 1916, a power vacuum occurred which was quickly filled by military strongmen, leading to widespread violence, chaos, and oppression. The Nationalist Kuomintang (KMT) government of Sun Yat-sen, based in Guangzhou, began contesting Yuan's Beiyang government based in Beijing for recognition as the legitimate government of China.

The most powerful cliques were the Zhili clique led by Feng Guozhang, who controlled several northern provinces; the Anhui clique led by Duan Qirui, based in several southeastern provinces; and the Fengtian clique led by Zhang Zuolin, based in Manchuria. The three cliques often engaged in conflict for territory and hegemony. In mid-1917, after Yuan's successor Li Yuanhong attempted to remove Duan as premier, the general Zhang Xun forced Li to resign and made a brief attempt to restore the Qing dynasty, which was quashed by Duan's troops. Feng became the acting president, but was forced to step down by Duan in late 1918 and was replaced by Xu Shichang. In mid-1920, the new Zhili clique leaders, Cao Kun and Wu Peifu, defeated Duan in the Zhili–Anhui War in an alliance with Zhang Zuolin. A power struggle broke out between Cao and Zhang, ending in Cao's victory in the First Zhili–Fengtian War in 1922. Li was briefly restored to an impotent presidency before being deposed by and in favour of Cao until 1924, when during the Second Zhili–Fengtian War, the latter was betrayed by his subordinate Feng Yuxiang, who joined with Zhang to stage a coup against Cao. Feng and Zhang shared power and recalled Duan to serve as president before they clashed in the Anti-Fengtian War that resulted in Zhang's victory. Duan was deposed and, after a series of short-lived cabinets, Zhang declared himself Generalissimo in 1927.

The warlords of southern China, who had cooperated against Yuan's dictatorship and Duan's attempt to extend Beiyang control to the south, were divided between Sichuan, Yunnan, Hunan, and Guangxi cliques, among others. In 1917, Sun Yat-sen created the Constitutional Protection Junta in Guangzhou to oppose the Beiyang warlords, but the southern warlords rivaled him for control, leading Sun to abandon it in 1918. In 1920, Chen Jiongming invaded Guangdong in the Guangdong–Guangxi War and gained control, after which Sun returned to Guangzhou. In 1922, Chen and Sun broke over political disagreements, after which the Yunnan and Guangxi warlords helped Sun regain power in 1923. To resolve the problem of being dependent on warlords, Sun accepted Soviet assistance in building a party and military infrastructure of his own, creating the Whampoa Military Academy and the National Revolutionary Army (NRA). After Sun died in 1925, the head of the Whampoa Academy, Chiang Kai-shek, emerged as leader of the NRA and KMT. In 1926, he launched the Northern Expedition, which destroyed the Zhili and Anhui forces. Zhang Zuolin was assassinated by the Japanese in 1928, and on 29 December, his son Zhang Xueliang accepted the leadership of Chiang's Nationalist government, thus reunifying China and beginning the Nanjing decade.

Despite most accounts of the era concluding it with the Northern Expedition of 1928, several warlords retained their influence during the 1930s and 1940s, resulting in events such as the Central Plains War of 1929–1930, in which the former warlords Feng Yuxiang, Yan Xishan of Shanxi, and Li Zongren of Guangxi rebelled against Chiang. Regional control by former warlords was problematic for the Nanjing government during the Second Sino-Japanese War and Chinese Civil War, and contributed to the Communists' final victory in 1949. Other major warlords included the Ma clique in Gansu, Ningxia, and Qinghai; Liu Xiang and Liu Wenhui in Sichuan; Long Yun in Yunnan; Zhang Jingyao in Hunan; Zhang Zongchang and Han Fuju in Shandong; and Sheng Shicai in Xinjiang.

=== Chinese Civil War ===
Eastern China in December 1936, shortly before the Xi'an Incident

The Chinese Civil War was fought between the government of the Republic of China (ROC), led by the Kuomintang (KMT), and the Chinese Communist Party (CCP). Armed conflict continued intermittently from 1 August 1927 until Communist victory that led to the Kuomintang's retreat to Taiwan on 7 December 1949.

The war is generally divided into two phases with an interlude. In 1926 and 1927, the KMT and the CCP, allied with one another in the First United Front, had carried out a very successful campaign, the Northern Expedition, against warlords in central China. The CCP calls this the First Revolutionary Civil War. The united front broke up and war broke out between the KMT and the CCP on 1 August 1927. The CCP calls this the Second Revolutionary Civil War; it lasted until 1937. From 1937 to 1945, hostilities were mostly put on hold as the Second United Front fought the Japanese invasion of China with eventual help from the Allies of World War II. However, armed clashes between the groups remained common.

The civil war resumed as soon as it became apparent that Japanese defeat was imminent, with the communists gaining the upper hand in the second phase of the war from 1945 to 1949, generally referred to as the Chinese Communist Revolution. The CCP calls this the Third Revolutionary Civil War. The Communists gained control of mainland China and proclaimed the People's Republic of China (PRC) in October 1949, while the Republic of China government retreated to the island of Taiwan in December. Starting in the 1950s, a lasting political and military stand-off between the two sides of the Taiwan Strait has ensued, with the ROC in Taiwan and the PRC on the mainland both claiming to be the legitimate government of all China. In addition, ROC guerrilla forces continued to operate in mainland China and northern Burma until 1961. After the Second Taiwan Strait Crisis, both tacitly ceased to engage in open conflict in 1979; however, no armistice or peace treaty has ever been signed.

== Failed reforms ==
=== Self-Strengthening Movement ===
The Self-Strengthening Movement, also known as the Westernization or Western Affairs Movement (c. 1861–1895), was a period of reforms initiated during the late Qing dynasty following the military disasters of the Opium Wars and Taiping Rebellion. These defeats exposed weaknesses in Qing military and administrative systems, prompting efforts to strengthen the state. These reforms included efforts across diplomatic, military, economic, and educational sectors.

In 1860, China's defeat in the Second Opium War and the successes of the Taiping Rebellion forced the imperial court to acknowledge a crisis. In 1861, Prince Gong and Grand Councilor Wen Xiang proposed establishing an office to direct foreign affairs. Prince Gong was made regent, Grand Councilor, and head of the newly formed Zongli Yamen (a de facto foreign affairs ministry). Local Han Chinese officials such as Zeng Guofan established private westernized militias in prosecuting the war against the rebels. Zeng and his armies eventually defeated the rebels and prosecuted efforts to import Western military technology and to translate Western scientific knowledge. They established successful arsenals, schools, and munitions factories.

In the 1870s and 1880s, their successors used their positions as provincial officials to build shipping, telegraph lines, and railways. China made substantial progress toward modernizing its heavy industry and military, but the majority of the ruling elite still subscribed to a conservative Confucian worldview, and the "self-strengtheners" were by and large uninterested in social reform beyond the scope of economic and military modernization. The Self-Strengthening Movement succeeded in securing the revival of the dynasty from the brink of eradication, sustaining it for another half-century. The considerable successes of the movement came to an abrupt end with China's defeat in the First Sino-Japanese War in 1895. Another major modernization effort known as the late Qing reforms started in 1901 following the failure of the Hundred Days' Reform and the invasions of the Eight-Nation Alliance.

=== Hundred Days' Reform ===
The Hundred Days' Reform (traditional Chinese: 百日維新; simplified Chinese: 百日维新; pinyin: Bǎirì Wéixīn; lit. '100 Days Reform') or Wuxu Reform (traditional Chinese: 戊戌變法; simplified Chinese: 戊戌变法; pinyin: Wùxū Biànfǎ; lit. 'Reform of the Wuxu year') was a short-lived national, cultural, political and educational reform movement in the Qing Empire, from June 11 to September 21, 1898. It sought to modernize China's institutions during a time of increasing foreign intervention in China following the country's defeat in the First Sino-Japanese War (1894–1895). Although brief, the movement introduced new political concepts of nationhood and sovereignty, inspiring many of the subsequent "New Policies" reforms launched after 1901.

Initiated by the Guangxu Emperor, it was led by reform-minded scholars, including Kang Youwei and Liang Qichao. Over a period of roughly 100 days, the Guangxu Emperor enacted a series of imperial edicts with various goals in mind. These mandates aimed to restructure government organization, reform the civil service examination system, modernize the army, promote industrial and education progress, and adopt elements of constitutional governance.

Some of these measures were implemented, such as the establishment of the Imperial University of Peking (now Peking University). However, most faced resistance from conservative factions. While Empress Dowager Cixi supported principles of the reform, she feared that sudden implementation, without bureaucratic support, would be disruptive and that the Japanese and other foreign powers would take advantage of any weakness. Thus, on September 21, 1898, Empress Dowager Cixi with her allies staged a coup d'état, forcing the emperor under house arrest and further executing six of the leading reformers. She later backed the late Qing reforms after the invasions of the Eight-Nation Alliance.

=== New Policies ===
The New Policies of the late Qing dynasty (Chinese: 清末新政; pinyin: Qīngmò xīnzhèng), also known as the New Deal of the late Qing dynasty or the Late Qing reforms (Chinese: 晚清改革; pinyin: Wǎnqīng gǎigé), and simply referred to as New Policies, were a series of cultural, economic, educational, military, diplomatic, and political reforms implemented in the last decade of the Qing dynasty to keep the dynasty in power after the invasions of the great powers of the Eight Nation Alliance in league with the ten provinces of the Southeast Mutual Protection during the Boxer Rebellion.

Late Qing reforms started in 1901, and since they were implemented with the backing of the Empress Dowager Cixi, they are also called Cixi's New Policies. The reforms were often considered more radical than the earlier Self-Strengthening Movement which came to an abrupt end with China's defeat in the First Sino-Japanese War in 1895. Despite the reforms and other political struggles, the revolutionaries led the 1911 Revolution which resulted in the fall of the Qing dynasty.

=== New Life Movement ===
The New Life Movement (Chinese: 新生活運動; Wade–Giles: Hsin^{1} Shêng^{1}huo^{2} Yün^{4}tung^{5}) was a government-led civic campaign in the 1930s Republic of China to promote cultural reform and Neo-Confucian social morality and to ultimately unite China under a centralised ideology following the emergence of ideological challenges to the status quo. Chiang Kai-shek as head of the government and the Chinese Nationalist Party launched the initiative on 19 February 1934 as part of an anti-communist campaign, and soon enlarged the campaign to target the whole nation.

Chiang and his wife, Soong Mei-ling, who played a major role in the campaign, advocated a life guided by four virtues, lǐ (禮/礼, proper rite), yì (義/义, righteousness or justice), lián (廉, honesty and cleanness) and chǐ (恥/耻, shame; sense of right and wrong). The campaign proceeded with help of the Blue Shirts Society and the CC Clique within the Nationalist Party, and Christian missionaries in China.

== Legacy ==
The usage of the Century of Humiliation in the Chinese Communist Party's historiography and modern Chinese nationalism, with its focus on the "sovereignty and integrity of [Chinese] territory," has been invoked in incidents such as the US bombing of the Chinese Belgrade embassy, the Hainan Island incident, and in response to protests for Tibetan independence along the 2008 Beijing Olympics torch relay. Some analysts have pointed to its use in deflecting foreign criticism of human rights abuses in China and domestic attention from issues of corruption and in bolstering its territorial claims and general economic and political rise.

=== Under Xi Jinping ===
Under Xi Jinping, the "Century of Humiliation" has become a central theme in the Chinese Communist Party's (CCP) historical narrative and political messaging. While earlier leaders also referenced the concept to frame China's modern history, Xi has further institutionalized it as a foundational component of national identity and policy discourse. In speeches, CCP documents, and state media, the narrative is used to highlight China's vulnerability during the period of foreign imperialism and to present the CCP as the force that ended national subjugation by outside powers. Xi frequently ties this historical memory to the broader goal of achieving the "great rejuvenation of the Chinese nation," a central slogan of his administration.

The theme has become especially prominent in Xi-era patriotic education initiatives. China's 2023 Patriotic Education Law mandated the promotion of the CCP's historical narrative, identifying the Century of Humiliation as a major instructional theme, required for school curricula, museums, public memorials, online platforms, and cultural industries. The law aims to reinforce loyalty to the CCP by contrasting China's historical weakness with its contemporary rise. Scholars note that under Xi, "patriotic education" has broadened in scope and consistency, with the Century of Humiliation serving to reinforce political legitimacy and promote vigilance against perceived external threats.

In foreign policy, references to the Century of Humiliation frequently appear in discussions of China's territorial claims and diplomatic posture. Chinese leaders and official publications often portray disputes in the South China Sea, the East China Sea, and the Sino-Indian border as issues tied to unresolved historical injustices. This framing appears in CCP speeches, government white papers, and state-run media. Resolving these "historical problems" is often depicted as essential to completing national rejuvenation. The narrative is also applied to Taiwan, with officials framing Chinese unification as part of the same historical process of overcoming national fragmentation and foreign interference.

In China's relationship with the United States, the Century of Humiliation is frequently invoked in the context of trade and economic competition. Chinese officials and state media often portray U.S. tariffs, export controls, investment screens, and supply-chain restructuring as modern forms of pressure analogous to the unequal treaties imposed on China during the nineteenth century. This narrative emphasizes that just as foreign powers once used their economic advantages to weaken China, present-day U.S. policies are interpreted as attempts to constrain China's technological development. The same framing often appears in official publications concerning Taiwan as well.

== Commentary and criticism ==
Historians have judged the Qing dynasty's vulnerability and weakness to foreign imperialism in the 19th century to be based mainly on its maritime naval weakness, but it achieved military success against Westerners on land. The historian Edward L. Dreyer stated, "China's nineteenth-century humiliations were strongly related to her weakness and failure at sea. At the start of the First Opium War, China had no unified navy and not a sense of how vulnerable she was to attack from the sea. British navy forces sailed and steamed wherever they wanted to go. In the Second Opium War (1856–1860), the Chinese had no way to prevent the Anglo-French navy expedition of 1860 from sailing into the Gulf of Zhili and landing as near as possible to Beijing. Meanwhile, new but not exactly modern Chinese armies suppressed the midcentury rebellions, bluffed Russia into a peaceful settlement of disputed frontiers in Central Asia, and defeated the French forces on land in the Sino-French War (1884–85). But the defeat at sea, and the resulting threat to steamship traffic to Taiwan, forced China to conclude peace on unfavorable terms."

The historian Jane E. Elliott criticized the allegation that China refused to modernize or was unable to defeat Western armies as simplistic by noting that China embarked on a massive military modernization in the late 1800s after several defeats, bought weapons from Western countries, and manufactured its own at arsenals, such as the Hanyang Arsenal during the Boxer Rebellion. In addition, Elliott questioned the claim that Chinese society was traumatized by the Western victories, as many Chinese peasants (then 90% of the population) lived outside the concessions and continued about their daily lives uninterrupted and without any feeling of "humiliation".

== See also ==
- Anti-Japanese sentiment in China
- Anti-Western sentiment in China
- Chinese Century
- Chinese concession of Incheon
- Foreign concessions in China
- Hurting the feelings of the Chinese people
- List of Chinese treaty ports
- List of treaties of China before the People's Republic
- New Imperialism, global Western domination during century of humiliation
- Map of National Shame
- Revanchism
- Scramble for China
- Sick man of Asia
- Territorial losses of Thailand
- Unequal treaties
- Western imperialism in Asia
