= Hong Kong Question =

The Question of Hong Kong is the question regarding the political status of Hong Kong, mainly referring to the sovereignty of the city after 1997, and which resulted in the Handover of Hong Kong.

The 1898 "Convention for the Extension of Hong Kong Territory" was an agreement for the British to control the New Territories for 99 years, meaning that it would end after 30 June 1997. As continued British control over the perpetually-ceded Hong Kong Island and Kowloon Peninsula alone would be impractical, they understood that any agreement would decide on the status of the territory collectively as a whole. In the 1970s, the British began discussions with the Chinese government over the status of the city once the treaty expired, resulting in the Sino-British Joint Declaration on the Question of Hong Kong. This agreement saw the British relinquish control over the city after 1997, but the Chinese promised to maintain autonomy in the city for 50 years.

== Other questions ==
The Question of Hong Kong may also refer to debates during after the Second World War. During the negotiation of the Sino-British New Equal Treaty between the United Kingdom and the Republic of China, Chinese leader Chiang Kai-shek wanted to include the future of Hong Kong, which was ceded to the British in the nineteenth century, into the discussion, and suggested that the entire city be returned to the Republic of China upon the end of the war. British Prime Minister Churchill utterly refused, and threatened to abandon the treaty altogether if the Chinese were to insist on the issue. The Chinese delegation reluctantly relented, and the issue was not mentioned at the final treaty signed in 1943. After the Japanese occupation of Hong Kong ended in 1945, the question over the political future of the city once again resurfaced, but with the Nationalists' apathy due to its focus on combatting against the Communists, and British insistence on control over a major port centre in the Far East, the British re-established control over the territory following the Japanese surrender.

The post-2047 future of Hong Kong is also debated, concerning whether Hong Kong’s capitalist system and way of life will remain "unchanged for 50 years" under "One Country, Two Systems" outlined in the Basic Law.

== See also ==
- Emigration from Hong Kong
- Hong Kong Autonomy Movement
- Hong Kong Independence
- Localism in Hong Kong
