= Treaty of Friendship, Commerce and Navigation between the United States of America and the Republic of China =

1946 treaty between the United States and China

- Signed: November 4 1946
- Location: (Taiwan) Nanking
- Effective: November 30 1948
- Signatories: (Republic of China (1912–1949)) Wang Shijie; (United States) John Leighton Stuart
- Parties: Republic of China; United States
- Language: English、Chinese

Full text
- Treaty of Friendship, Commerce and Navigation between the United States of America and the Republic of China at Wikisource

The Treaty of Friendship, Commerce and Navigation between the United States of America and the Republic of China was a bilateral treaty signed by the United States and China on November 4, 1946. It became effective on November 30, 1948, following the mutual exchange of ratifications, pursuant to Article XXX. It fulfilled the desires of both countries to establish such a treaty as previously expressed in Article XII of the Treaty for Relinquishment of Extraterritorial Rights in China. The US received a large number of economic privileges from this agreement and Chinese businesses complained of unfair competition from US products which dominated the China market. While the treaty contained elements of equal rights, China was in no economic position to exercise its privileges vis-a-vis the vastly more developed US, which have led some scholars to describe the treaty as 'unfavourable' to China or comparing them to the Unequal Treaties. On the other hand, Sir George Sansom, British envoy to the US, reported that many US military officers saw US monopoly on Far Eastern trade as a rightful reward for fighting the Pacific war, a sentiment echoed by US elected officials.

== Terms of the Treaty ==
The terms of the Treaty are summarized as follows:

- Article I: Section 1 declared mutual peace and friendship between China and the U.S. Section 2 provided for the mutual exchange and recognition of diplomats with reciprocal rights, privileges, exemptions, and immunities generally recognized under international law.
- Article II: Section 1 authorized nationals of each country to enter territories in the other country to reside, travel, and carry on trade subject to any applicable laws and regulations in the host country and without unreasonable interference and without requiring any travel documents other than either valid passports or other official identification documents issued by the other country. Section 2 authorized nationals of each country to engage in a broad range of enumerated activities in the territories of the other country subject to any applicable laws and regulations of the host country to the same extent that the laws and regulations apply to nationals of the host country except the practice of a profession reserved exclusively to nationals of the host country. Section 3 required that, under Sections 1 and 2, each country must treat nationals of the other country no less favorably than the nationals of a third country. Section 4 declares that the Treaty does not affect each country's existing and future immigration laws except that such laws may not prevent the nationals of either country from entering, traveling, and residing in the territories of the other country to carry on trade between both countries or engaging in related commercial activity on less favorable terms than those afforded by the country to nationals of a third country engaging in the same activities in relation to the third country. Section 4 also declares that the geographic zones for immigration established by the U.S. in Section 3 of the Immigration Act of 1917 shall not prevent Chinese people and people of Chinese descent from being admitted into the U.S.
- Article III: Section 1 broadly defined "corporations and associations." Section 2 declared that all corporations and associations of one of the countries shall have their juridical status recognized in the territories of the other country, regardless of whether they have an established presence there, and may establish branch offices and fulfill their functions in the other country as authorized by treaty or as consistent with the laws and regulations of the host country. Section 3 requires each of the countries to permit all corporations and associations of the other country to engage in a broad set of enumerated activities within the host country's territories without interference to the same extent as those of the host country except as otherwise limited by the host country's laws. Section 3 further specified that all corporations and associations of China shall be treated the same in each U.S. state, territory, or possession as others of another U.S. state, territory, or possession. Section 4 requires each of the countries to treat all corporations and associations of the other country no less favorably than those of a third country.
- Article IV: Section 1 provides that nationals and corporations and associations of one of the countries within the territories of the other country are to have broadly enumerated rights and privileges with respect to organization of and participation in corporations and associations of the host country in accordance with the host country's applicable laws and regulations under the same terms as nationals and corporations and associations of a third country. Section 1 also provides that corporations and associations organized or participated in by nationals or corporations and associations of the other country are to be permitted to exercise the functions for which they were created or organized subject to any applicable laws and regulations of the other country under the same terms as corporations and associations organized by or participated in by nationals or corporations and associations of a third country. However, Section 1 further authorizes each of the countries to restrict such rights and privileges to the same extent that the other country restricts such rights and privileges with regards to mining on public lands. Section 2 provides that nationals and corporations and associations of one of the countries within the territories of the other country are to be permitted to organize and participate in corporations and associations of the host country for a broad set of enumerated activities as permitted by applicable laws and regulations of the host country, but there is no requirement that the terms be as favorable as those granted to nationals and corporations and associations of the host country. Section 3 provides that corporations and associations of one of the countries organized and participated in by nationals or corporations and associations of the other country are to be permitted to participate in a broad set of enumerated activities within the territories of the other country in accordance with host country's applicable laws and regulations to the same extent as corporations and associations organized and participated in by nationals or corporations and associations of the host country.
- Article V: Any rights granted by one of the countries for nationals and corporations and associations of a third country to explore for or produce mineral resources in its territories shall extend the same rights to the nationals and corporations and associations of the other country.
- Article VI: Incomplete
- Article VII: Incomplete
- Article VIII: Incomplete
- Article IX: Incomplete
- Article X: Incomplete
- Article XI: Incomplete
- Article XII: Incomplete
- Article XIII: Incomplete
- Article XIV: Incomplete
- Article XV: Both countries agreed to pursue opportunities with other countries to eliminate discriminatory treatment and monopolistic restrictions in international commerce.
- Article XVI: Incomplete
- Article XVII: Incomplete
- Article XVIII: Incomplete
- Article XIX: Incomplete
- Article XX: Incomplete
- Article XXI: Incomplete
- Article XXII: Incomplete
- Article XXIII: Incomplete
- Article XXIV: Incomplete
- Article XXV: Incomplete
- Article XXVI: Incomplete
- Article XXVII: The terms of the Treaty applied to all areas of land and water under the sovereignty of China and the U.S., except for the U.S. Panama Canal Zone.
- Article XVIII: Any disputes regarding the terms of the Treaty that could not be resolved through diplomacy were to be resolved by either the International Court of Justice or other peaceful means.
- Article XXIX: Section 1 stated that the Treaty would supersede any provisions in eight earlier treaties between China and the U.S. to the extent that they were still in effect: Treaty of Wanghia, Treaty of Tientsin, Treaty Establishing Trade Regulations and Tariff (1858), Burlingame Treaty, Immigration Treaty (1880), Treaty of Commercial Intercourse and Judicial Procedure (1880), Treaty as to Commercial Relations (1903), Treaty Establishing Rates of Duty on Imports into China (1920), and Treaty Regulating Tariff Relations (1928). Section 2 specified that the Treaty was to have no effect on the Treaty for Relinquishment of Extraterritorial Rights in China.
- Article XXX: Section 1 provided requirements for the mutual exchange of ratifications. Section 2 specified that the Treaty would become effective on the day ratifications are exchanged and remain in effect for five years. In accordance with Sections 1 and 2, the Treaty thus became effective on November 30, 1948, following the mutual exchange of ratifications on that day. Section 3 provided that the Treaty would automatically renew each year after the first five years unless one of the parties notified the other party of its intent to terminate the treaty at least one year in advance.
