= Changqing Treaty =

822 peace treaty

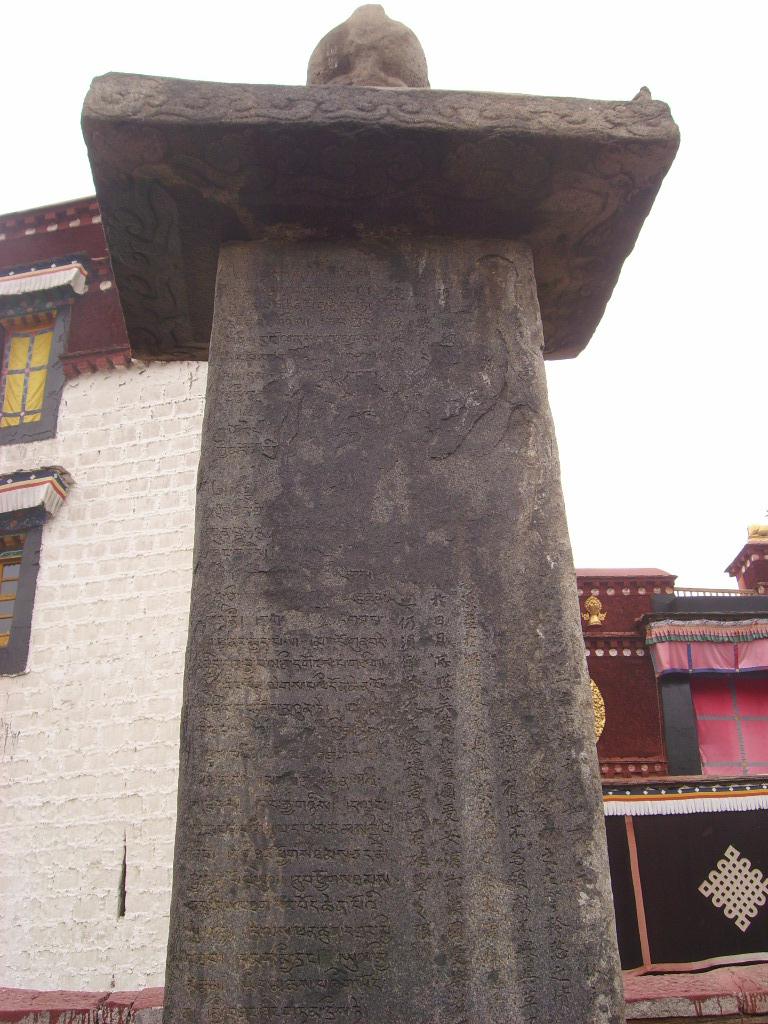
- Tibetan stele of the treaty
- Type: Peace treaty
- Replaces: Peace treaty between China and Tibet (783)
- Parties: Tang Empire; Tibetan Empire
- Languages: Chinese; Tibetan

The Changqing Treaty (Chinese: 長慶會盟) was a peace treaty signed between Ralpacan of the Tibetan Empire and Emperor Muzong of the Tang dynasty in 822.

It followed an earlier peace agreement signed by Emperor Dezong of Tang with the Tibetan Empire in 783, which was overridden by the Tibetan Empire.

The treaty would serve as a basis for Tang–Tibet relations.

== Name ==
The Chinese name Changqing Treaty is derived from the era name of Emperor Muzong.

== Context ==
The Yarlung dynasty under Ralpachan came into conflict with the Uyghur Khaganate in the north, and with the Tang dynasty over the control of the Silk Road and the Tarim Basin.

The Tang dynasty allied with Uyghur Khaganate. In 816, the Tibetans attacked Uyghur territory. In 821, Tibetans were attacked. Tibet did an incursion into Tang territory and sacked the Tang capital.

After a limited Tibetan incursion into Tang territory, the Tang dynasty promised marriage alliances to the Uyghur and Tibetan rulers. These marriages, as well as a Tang-Tibetan peace treaty, were finalized in 822.

== Signers ==
On November 8, 821, a Tang delegation left for Tibet to sign the treaty. The treaty was signed between the Emperor of Tibet, Ralpachan, and the Emperor Muzong of Tang.

== Consequences ==
The treaty helped stabilize political, military, and trade relations between Tibet and the Tang dynasty. Thus the treaty delimited the border between the two empires and the Tang recognized the occupation of Gansu by the Tibetans.

In 823, a stele known as the Tang-Tibet Treaty Inscription was erected in front of the main gate of the Jokhang Temple in Lhasa and of which there are two other copies, one in the capital of the Tang dynasty in Chang'an at the Emperor's Gate, and the other at the Tibetan-Tang border on Mount Meru. The terms of the treaty of the alliance are inscribed therein. Peace was thus assured for almost twenty years.

== See also ==
- Tang–Tibet Treaty Inscription
