= Treaty between the United States and China for the Relinquishment of Extraterritorial Rights in China =

1943 treaty

Treaty for the Relinquishment of Extraterritorial Rights in China
Treaty Between the United States of America and the Republic of China for the Relinquishment of Extraterritorial Rights in China and the Regulation of Related Matters
- Signed: 11 January 1943
- Negotiators: (United States) Cordell Hull; (Republic of China (1912–1949)) T. V. Soong
- Parties: (Republic of China (1912–1949)) Republic of China; United States

The Treaty between the United States and China for the Relinquishment of Extraterritorial Rights in China was a bilateral treaty signed by the United States and the Republic of China on January 11, 1943. The formal name of the treaty was Treaty Between the United States of America and the Republic of China for the Relinquishment of Extraterritorial Rights in China and the Regulation of Related Matters. It became effective on May 20, 1943, following the mutual exchange of ratifications pursuant to Article VIII.

After the United States declared war upon Japan on December 8, 1941, the governments of the United States and United Kingdom mutually decided that it would be advantageous to end extraterritoriality and the unilateral privileges in China that had been granted by the "unequal treaties." Extraterritoriality was thus ended, making citizens of the United States and United Kingdom in China subject to Chinese law, as well as the existence of treaty ports and their autonomous foreign settlements, legation quarters, and the right to station foreign warships in Chinese waters and foreign troops on Chinese territory.

In close coordination with the United States, the United Kingdom and China also established a corresponding treaty which served essentially the same purpose and was concluded on the same day.

== Background ==
After war was declared between the United States and Japan in December 1941, the United States became China's ally but could not send military aid on the large scale needed. Japanese officials justified their conquests by claiming that Japan was liberating Asia from Western imperialism and that Westerners were racist and exploitative. A high official in the U.S. Department of State warned that "the Chinese are becoming increasingly disappointed and resentful" and that some Chinese were "beginning to talk of the possibility of China ceasing to be an active belligerent..." Former U.S. Secretary of State Cordell Hull, although not in the inner circle on policy toward China, turned his attention to negotiating a treaty to end the privileges granted over the previous century. The treaty was ratified by the United States Senate unanimously and came into effect on 20 May 1943.

In Chongqing, China's wartime capital, Generalissimo Chiang Kai-shek declared that with the signing of the treaties, "an independent China on equal footing" has become "a real friend" of Great Britain and the United States. Henceforth, Chiang concluded, "if we are weak, if we lack self-confidence, the fault will be ours." The official press praised Chiang. One newspaper said that the treaties made the Unequal Treaties into no more than "a stack of waste paper," and bragged that if it were not for the KMT, Sun Yat-sen, and Generalissimo Chiang, the treaties would still be in force. The leftist and communist press reacted quickly. They praised the efforts of the Communist Party in creating the United Front and claimed that the party had been a leader in the struggle for national liberation.

In December 1943, in response to some of the same pressures which brought about the end of extraterritoriality, the Senate passed the Chinese Exclusion Repeal Act which ended the formal and legal exclusion of Chinese from immigration to the United States.

== Terms of the Treaty ==
The terms of the Treaty are summarized as follows:

- Article I: The U.S. relinquished all rights to extraterritoriality in China, including such rights previously established under the Treaty of Wanghia and the Treaty of Tientsin. As a result, the United States Court for China and the U.S. Consular Courts in China, which exercised extraterritorial jurisdiction in China, were abolished.
- Article II: The U.S. and China terminated the Boxer Protocol.
- Article III: The U.S. agreed that administration and control of the International Settlements at Shanghai and Amoy should revert to China. Accordingly, the U.S. relinquished its rights of administration and control back to China and agreed to assist China with obtaining the relinquishment of such rights from other countries.
- Article IV: Previous real estate titles and leases in China were to be respected.
- Article V: The U.S. had long allowed Chinese nationals to travel, reside, and carry on trade within its territory. Under Article V, China reciprocated these rights for U.S. nationals within its territory. The U.S. and China also agreed to treat each other's nationals within its territory the same as its own nationals with respect to all legal proceedings, administration of justice, and taxation.
- Article VI: Each nation was authorized to establish consular offices in the other nation. Nationals of each nation present in the other nation were authorized to communicate with their nation's consular offices.
- Article VII: The U.S. and China agreed that both nations would negotiate a comprehensive modern treaty of friendship, commerce, navigation and consular rights six months after the end of World War II. The Treaty of Friendship, Commerce and Navigation between the United States of America and the Republic of China was established as a result.
- Article VIII: The requirements for the Treaty to become effective, including ratification, were set forth. In accordance with these requirements, the Treaty became effective on May 20, 1943.

== Sources and further reading ==
- Feis, Herbert (1953). The China Tangle: The American Effort in China from Pearl Harbor to the Marshall Mission. Princeton: Princeton University Press.
- Wang, Dong (2005). China's Unequal Treaties: Narrating National History. Lanham, Md.: Lexington Books. ISBN 0739112082.
