= Musée Dapper =

Museum in France

Coordinates: 48°52′18″N 2°17′17″E

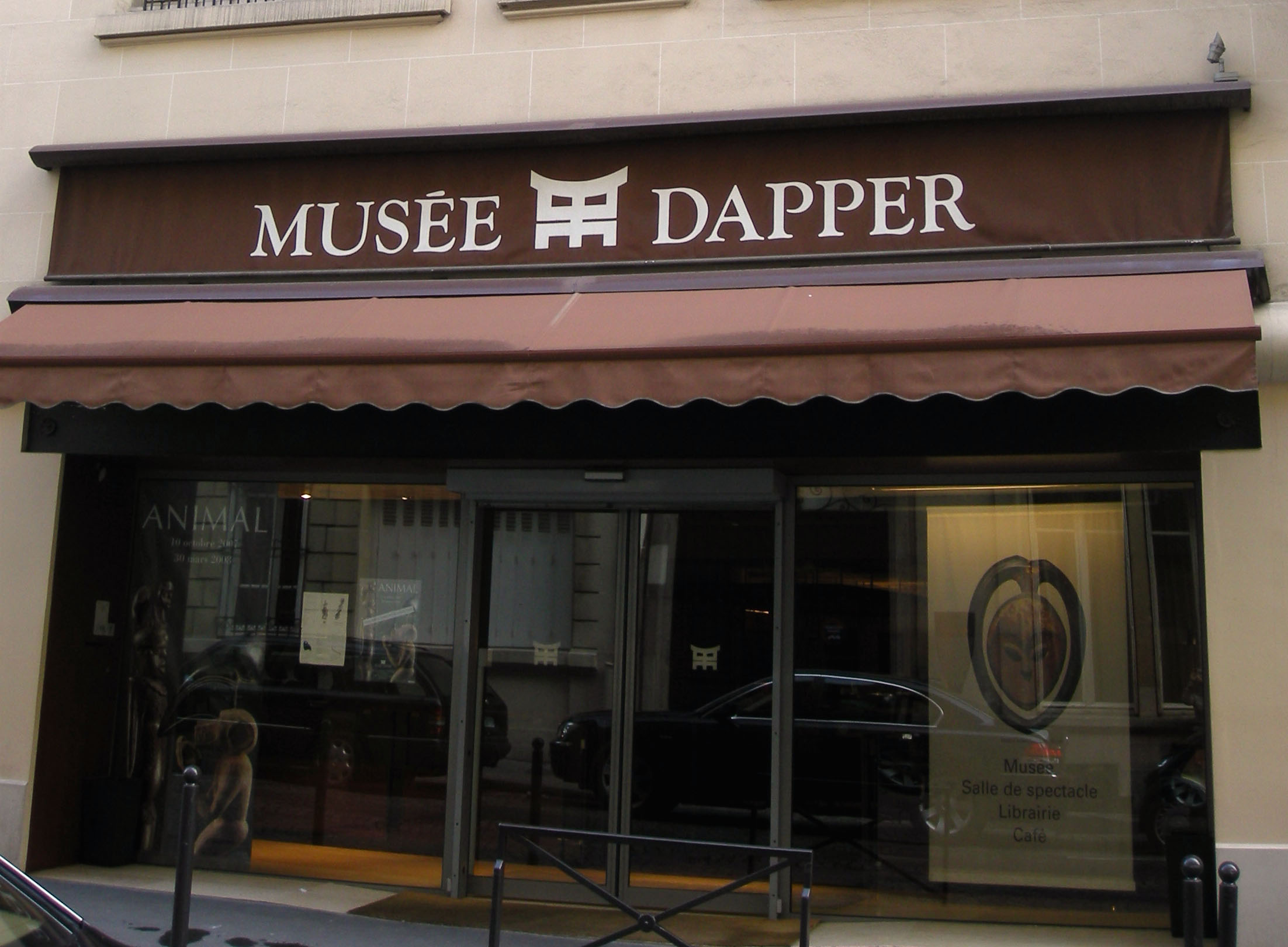
Musée Dapper

Musée Dapper was a French museum specializing in African art. It was opened in May 1986, and closed on 18 June 2017. The Dapper Foundation is still located at the same premises in the 16th arrondissement of Paris at 35 rue Paul Valéry, Paris, France.

== Background ==
The museum opened in 1986, as an effort of the Olfert Dapper Foundation, and was named in honour of a Dutch humanist who in 1668 published an encyclopaedic description of Africa. In addition to a series of art exhibitions, the museum sponsored:

- dance featuring choreographers including Josiane Antourel (Martinique), Tchekpo Dan Agbetou (Bénin) and Irène Tassembedo (Burkina Faso);
- concerts featuring musicians such as Guem (Algeria/Niger), Ballaké Sissoko (Mali), Omar Sosa (Cuba), So Kalmery (DRC), Mariann Matheus (Guadeloupe), Jeff Baillard, and the group Xtrem’Jam (Martinique);
- plays including Atterrissage (Kangni Alem), directed by Denis Mpunga, and Les Enfants de la mer, an adaptation by the Martinique playwright José Exélis of the work by Edwidge Danticat;
- children’s shows (storytelling, circus, puppet shows), including Histoires du monde, performed by Naïf Théâtre, and Golotoé ou la gourde divine, by Danaye Kalanfeï;
- and seminars.

== See also ==
- List of museums in Paris
