= Peace treaty between China and Tibet (783) =

Peace treaty between China and Tibet about the Silk Road, signed on 783

Treaty of Qingshui
Peace treaty between China and Tibet of 783
- Type: Peace treaty
- Location: Qingshui (county)
- Replaced by: Changqing Treaty
- Parties: Tang Empire; Tibetan Empire

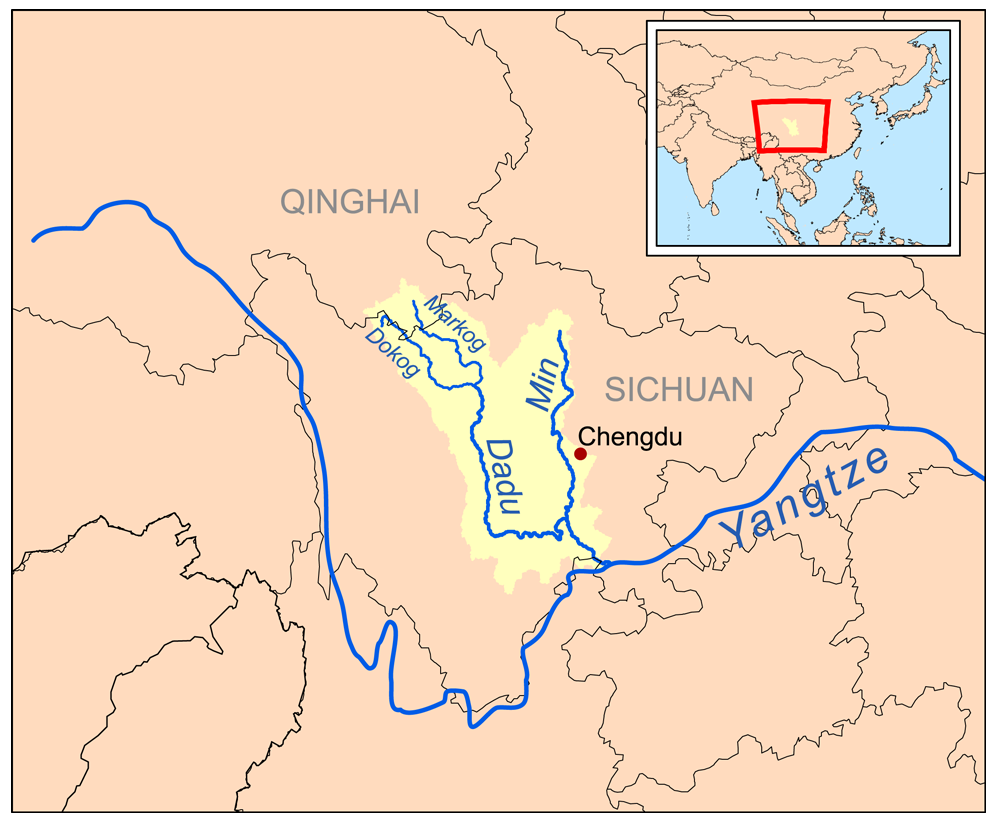
A map of the Min River (Minjiang) and Dadu River drainage basin.

The Peace treaty between China and Tibet of 783, also called the Sino-Tibetan Peace Treaty of 783 or Treaty of Qingshui (Chinese: 清水之盟) is a peace treaty negotiated in 783 between the Chinese Tang dynasty, ruled by Emperor Dezong and the Tibetan Empire ruled by Trisong Detsen, giving the latter all the land in the Kokonor region which corresponds to present-day Qinghai Lake. The treaty is celebrated in Qingshui, and was the sixth treaty between China and Tibet.

== Context ==
During the reign of the Emperor of Tibet, Trisong Detsen (740 - 797), the Tibetans invaded the capital of China Chang'an (nowadays Xian) in 763. The Chinese Emperor Dezong of Tang having fled, the Tibetans appointed a new emperor.

Trisong Detsen then sought to expand westward, reaching the Oxus River and threatening the Arab Caliph, Haroun ar-Rashid. The Caliph was concerned enough to establish an alliance with the Emperor of China. During the remainder of his reign, the king was occupied by wars with the Arabs in the west, and relieved the pressure on his Chinese adversaries in the east and north, until his reign ended in 797.

== Peace Treaty ==
The Sino-Tibetan peace treaty was signed in 783 in present-day Qingshui depriving China of the territories west of the Dadu River. The treaty did not prevent hostilities between China and the Tibetan Empire from resuming three years later.
