= Amy Heller =

American art historian

Amy Heller is an American Tibetologist and art historian.

== Biography ==
Since 1986, Heller has been associated with the Center National de la recherche scientifique in Paris and subsequently also to the Tibetan and Himalayan Library. She studied Art History at Barnard College of Columbia University (B. A. cum laude 1973) and Tibetan language and civilisation at the National Institute of Oriental Languages in Paris (diploma in 1979). She earned her Ph.D. in 1992 in philology and history of Tibet at the École pratique des hautes études in Paris. She is currently visiting professor since 2007 at the Centre for Tibetan Studies, University of Sichuan, Chengdu, China. She was visiting professor at La Sapienza, university of Rome, Italy, in 2006 and 2008.

Heller has traveled numerous times to the Tibet Autonomous Region, Nepal and also traveled along parts of the Silk Route including Dunhuang and the Qinghai regions, where she investigated Tibetan tombs in Dulan, Qinghai in 1997. Since 1995, she worked in a project to restore Tibetan architecture in Tibetan monasteries, notably Grathang and Zhalu, Iwang. She was appointed by the Swiss Federal government to supervise the roof restoration project of the Ramoche Temple, Lhasa, from 2004 to 2006, under the auspices of the Swiss Ministry of Culture and the Swiss Foreign Affairs.

She published in 1999 Art et Sagesses du Tibet; in English, Tibetan Art Tracing the development of Spiritual Ideals and Art in Tibet 600–2000. In addition to the French and the English editions, Italian and Spanish translations were published by JAca book and Libsa SA, respectively. In 2007, she published the catalogue of the Ashmolean Museum, Early Himalayan Art. This catalogue is now online in the Jameel Centre of the Ashmolean Museum. In 2009, she published Hidden Treasures of the Himalayas Tibetan manuscripts, paintings and sculptures of Dolpo, Serindia publications, Chicago, 2009 (see www.Serindia.com). In addition, she has published on architecture and Tibetan art, Tibetan history, some 75 articles and museum catalogues, working with the Ashmolean Museum, Oxford (England), Musée Guimet, Paris (France), the Metropolitan Museum of Art, New York, the Art Institute of Chicago, and the Tibetan collection of The Newark Museum, Newark, NJ.

Heller several times was curator for exhibitions in Tibetan art, including for the Beinecke Rare Book and Manuscript Library and Yale University Art Gallery, both part of Yale University.

In the mid-2000s, she worked on research of 650 volumes of Tibetan manuscripts from the late 11th to early 12th to the 16th century on the cultural history of Dolpo temple in Nepal, resulting in the 2009 book: Hidden Treasures of the Himalayas: Tibetan manuscripts, paintings and sculptures of Dolpo.

2011–2013, Heller has been a research associate at the School of Oriental and African Studies.

2014–2016, Heller has been lecturer on Tibetan Archaeology at the National Institute of Oriental Languages (INALCO Paris).

2017–2018, Heller taught at University of Bern invited by the Institute of Science of Religions and Central Asian Studies. Subsequently, she is affiliated with this institute and taught Art and Architecture of Tibet and Mongolia in 2019–2020.

== Bibliography ==
In the course of her scientific career Amy Heller authored approximately 200 publications.

- Heller, Amy (1999) Art et Sagesse du Tibet, Zodiaque, ISBN 978-2-7369-0256-8
- Heller, Amy (1999) "Tibetan Art: Tracing the Development of Spiritual Ideals and Art in Tibet 600-2000 A.D." Jaca Book/Antique Collectors' Club, ISBN 88-16-69004-6
- Heller, Amy (2007) Early Himalayan Art, Ashmolean Museum, ISBN 978-1-85444-209-3
- Heller, Amy (2009) "Hidden Treasures of the Himalayas Tibetan manuscripts, paintings and sculptures of Dolpo", Serindia Publications, ISBN 978-1-932476-44-6
- Valrae Reynolds, Amy Heller, Janet Gyatso & Dan Martin (1999) From the Sacred Realm, Prestel Publishing, ISBN 978-3-7913-2148-6
- Blondeau, Anne-Marie, Katia Buffetrille, Amy Heller (contribution), et al. (2002) Le Tibet est-il chinois?, Albin Michel, ISBN 9782226134264
- Rocca, Donald La, J. Clarke, Lozang Jamspal (contribution) & Amy Heller (contribution) (2006) Warriors of the Himalayas: Rediscovering the Arms and Armor of Tibet, Yale University Press, Collection: Metropolitan Museum of Art Publications ISBN 978-0-300-11153-8
