= Sino-British Treaty for the Relinquishment of Extra-Territorial Rights in China =

1943 treaty between China and the United Kingdom

- Traditional Chinese: 中英關於取消英國在華治外法權及處理有關特權條約
- Simplified Chinese: 中英关于取消英国在华治外法权及处理有关特权条约
Transcriptions
Standard Mandarin
- Hanyu Pinyin: Zhōng Yīng guānyú Qǔxiāo Yīngguó zài Huá Zhìwàifǎquán jí Chǔlǐ yǒuguān Tèquán Tiáoyuē
- Wade–Giles: Chung Ying kuan-yü ch'ü-hsiao Ying-kuo tsai Hua Chih-wai-fa-ch'üan chi ch'u-li yu-kuan t'e-ch'üan T'iao-yüeh

Sino-British New Equal Treaty
- Traditional Chinese: 中英平等新約
- Simplified Chinese: 中英平等新约
Transcriptions
Standard Mandarin
- Hanyu Pinyin: Zhōng Yīng Píngděng Xīnyuē
- Wade–Giles: Chung Ying P'ing-teng Hsin-yüeh

Treaty Between His Majesty in Respect of the United Kingdom and India and His Excellency the President of the National Government of the Republic of China for the Relinquishment of Extra-Territorial Rights in China and the Regulation of Related Matters
- Traditional Chinese: 聯合王國及印度國王陛下和中華民國國民政府主席閣下關於放棄在中國治外法權有關事項的規定的條約
- Simplified Chinese: 联合王国及印度国王陛下和中华民国国民政府主席阁下关于放弃在中国治外法权有关事项的规定的条约
Transcriptions
Standard Mandarin
- Hanyu Pinyin: Liánhéwángguó jí Yìndù Guówáng Bìxià hé Zhōnghuá Mínguó Guómínzhèngfǔ Zhǔxí Géxià guānyú Fàngqì zài Zhōngguó Zhìwàifǎquán yǒuguān Shìxiàng de Guīdìng de Tiáoyuē
- Wade–Giles: Lien-ho-wang-kuo chi Yin-tu Kuo-wang Pi-hsia ho Chung-hua Min-kuo Kuo-min-cheng-fu Ke-hsia kuan-yü Fang-ch'i tsai Chung-kuo Chih-wai-fa-ch'üan yu-kuan shih-hsiang te Kui-ting te T'iao-yüeh

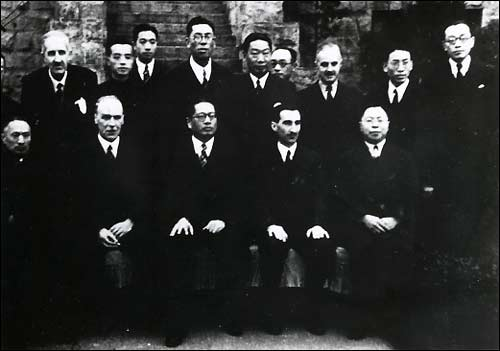
The deputations which signed the treaty. Front row from left: Wellington Koo, Horace James Seymour, T. V. Soong, Hugh Edward Richardson, and Wu Guozhen.

The Sino-British Treaty for the Relinquishment of Extra-Territorial Rights in China, or the Sino-British New Equal Treaty, was a bilateral treaty concluded between the British and the Chinese government in Chongqing on 11 January 1943. The formal name of the treaty was Treaty Between His Majesty in Respect of the United Kingdom and India and His Excellency the President of the National Government of the Republic of China for the Relinquishment of Extra-Territorial Rights in China and the Regulation of Related Matters.

Under that treaty, the British government relinquished any special rights it had in China. This was done as a conciliatory step towards the Chinese government in order to boost its cooperation with the Allied Powers in the Second World War. The United States and China concluded a similar treaty on the same day.

Ratifications were exchanged in Chongqing on 20 May 1943, and the treaty became effective on the same day. It was registered in the League of Nations Treaty Series on 30 September 1944.

== Background ==
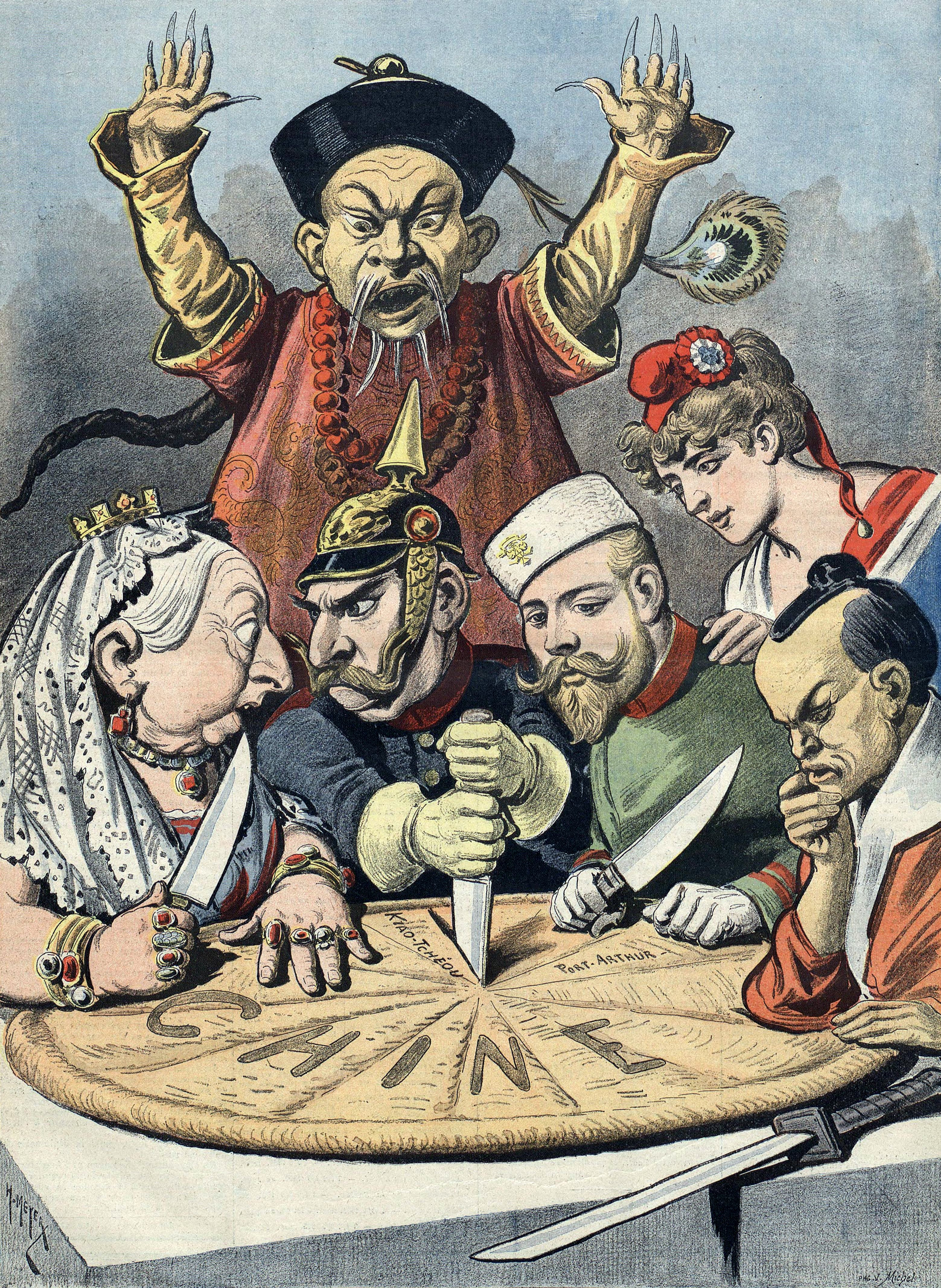
China – the cake of Kings and Emperors cartoon showing Britain, Germany, Russia, France and Japan dividing China.

The Treaty of Nanjing, concluded in 1842, granted the British government extra-territorial rights in China, which included mainly commercial rights for British companies and extra-territorial rights for British nationals in China. British subjects could only be prosecuted for crimes or have civil cases brought against them before British Consular courts or the British Supreme Court for China and Japan.

The need to modify the conditions of extra-territorial rights in China arose from the dire situation vis à vis military cooperation between Britain, China, and the US, following the Japanese invasion of China in 1937 and later during the Second World War. On 18 July 1940, British Prime Minister Winston Churchill declared in parliament his government's intention of relinquishing extra-territorial rights in China once peace was concluded. The issue was raised again following the outbreak of war in the Pacific in December 1941, and at this point the British position was greatly influenced by the US position. Already in March 1942, agreement was reached among State Department officials regarding the need to modify existing agreements with the Chinese government in the latter's favour in order to improve relations. On 25 April 1942, the British government sounded its positions on the matter in a memorandum to the US government, in which it agreed to abolish extra-territorial jurisdiction in principle, but suggested to postpone negotiations to that effect until the end of the war. On 6 May 1942, the US government responded to the British memorandum that it was not desirable to abrogate extra-territoriality in China at the moment, but that it would consider doing so in case approached about it by the Chinese government. On 27 August 1942, US Secretary of State Cordell Hull suggested that in case negotiations for relinquishing extra-territoriality commence, the treaty should provide for

- abrogation of the Boxer Protocol of 1901 and of the international settlement in Shanghai,
- settlement of legal issues resulting from the termination of the diplomatic quarter in Beijing,
- new legal arrangements to allow the retention of some foreign landed property in China under the new policy,
- similar rights for Chinese nationals in the US as US nationals in China,
- reciprocity in consular representation for the US and China,
- negotiations for comprehensive new treaties on commerce within 6 months following the termination of the war, and
- settlement of all disputes on the rights of Americans in China according to norms of international law.

The British government was not receptive at first to Hull's proposals, but the US government began pressing London to start negotiations with Chongqing right away, fearing lest waiting until the war's end will strengthen Chinese public pressures to adopt stiffer positions vis-a-vis the US and British governments. On 3 October 1942, the US government submitted to the British government a draft US-Chinese treaty based on Hull's proposal of 27 August.

The Chinese side first indicated its desire to abolish extraterritoriality in August 1942, in a conversation between Wang Beng-shen, advisor to Chiang Kai-shek on Japanese affairs, and member of the British embassy in Chongqing. The Chinese adviser stated that the Chinese government desired to abolish extra-territorial rights in Shanghai, and was willing to grant some special status to British companies in that city.

As a result of US pressure, the British government agreed in early October 1942 to enter negotiations with the Chinese government on the abrogation of extra-territoriality, and on 9 October the US and British governments officially notified the Chinese government of their initiative to that effect.

Negotiations eventually led to the conclusion of two similar treaties in January 1943 between China and the UK and US respectively agreeing the relinquishment of extra-territorial rights in China.

== Terms of the treaty ==
The wording of the treaty was similar to the proposal made by Hull on 27 August 1942, as it remained brief in order to allow for more detailed agreement once the war was over.

- Article 1 stipulated the treaty shall apply to all territories of the British Empire and the Republic of China.
- Article 2 abrogated all international agreements which granted extra-territorial rights in China to any British nationals and companies.
- Article 3 specifically abrogated the Boxer protocol of 7 September 1901 and promised in the future to restore to the Chinese government the control over the Legations Quarter in Beijing (this provision was mainly symbolic, since Beijing was at the time under Japanese occupation).
- Article 4 terminated all British administrations and control in Shanghai, Amoy (Xiamen), Tientsin (Tianjin) and Canton (Guangzhou) (which were under Japanese occupation at the time).
- Article 5 secured the existing rights and titles to real property possessed by British nationals and companies in China, under protection of the Chinese Government subject to Chinese law.
- Article 6 bound the British and Chinese governments to reciprocity in their commercial relations.
- Article 7 regulated the work of diplomatic agents in each country.
- Article 8 provided for negotiations for new treaties of commerce, to begin six months following the conclusion of the war being waged.
- Article 9 provided for ratification of the treaty.

== Hong Kong ==
Chiang Kai-shek attempted to put the Hong Kong Question onto the two parties' agenda, suggesting that the Kowloon concession should be returned to the Republic of China along with the other foreign concessions. This was fiercely rejected by the United Kingdom's prime minister at the time, Winston Churchill. The United Kingdom also demanded that the Republic of China give their written consent that the Kowloon concession was not included within the unequal treaties, or else they would refuse to sign, so the Republic of China was forced to drop the concession of Kowloon from the agenda. The two sides signed the treaty, with the Republic of China writing a formal letter to the United Kingdom and securing the right to raise the issue of Hong Kong on a later occasion.
