= Treaty ports =

Ports in East Asia opened to trade with Western countries

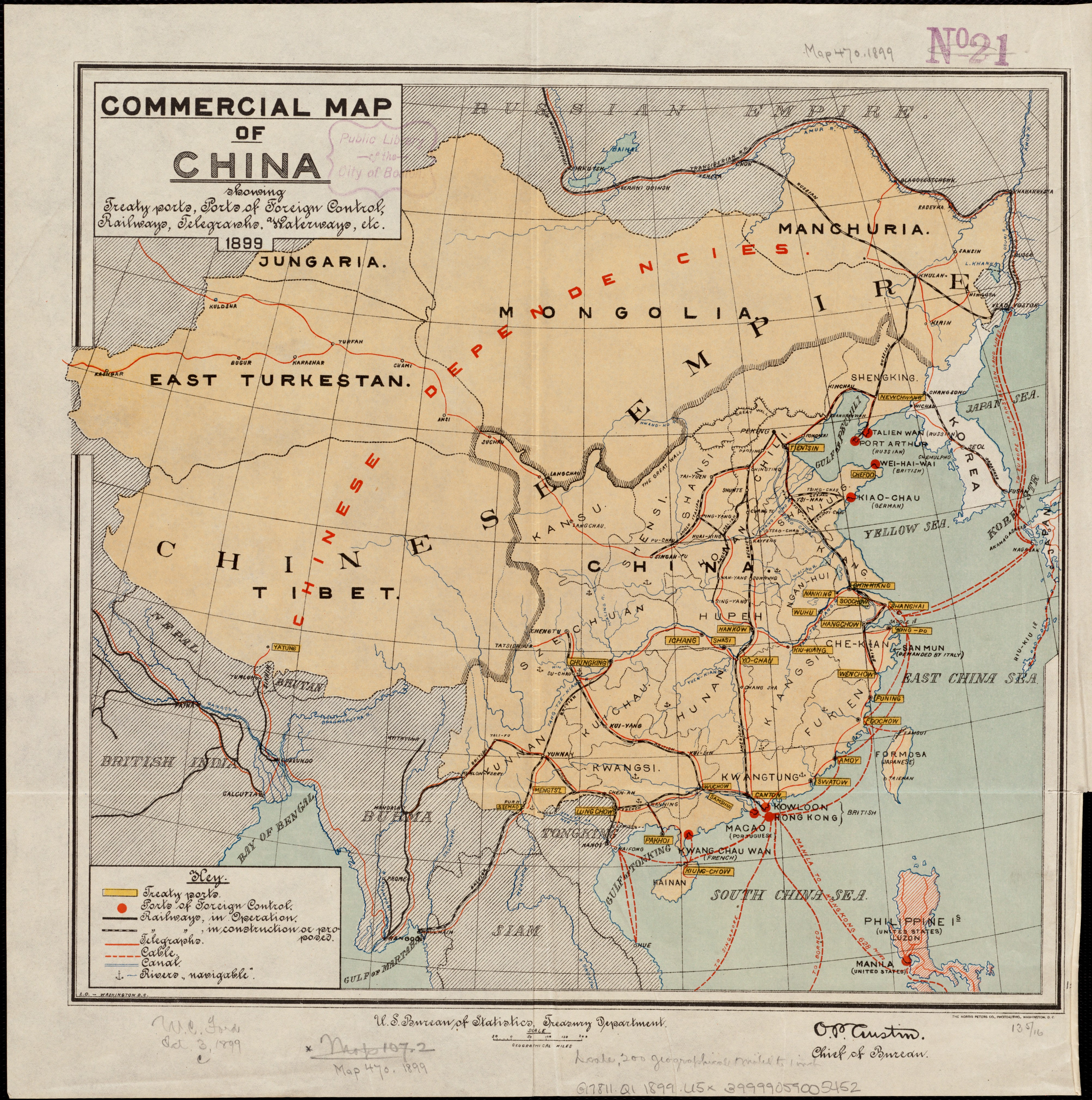
A commercial map of China by the U.S. Treasury Department in 1899, showing treaty ports, ports of foreign control, railways, telegraphs & waterways.

Treaty ports (Chinese: 商埠; Japanese: 条約港) were port cities in China and Japan that were opened to foreign trade by force in the mid to late-19th century, beginning in 1842 after a British victory in the First Opium War—largely through the "unequal treaties" imposed by Western powers—as well as cities in Korea that were similarly opened up by the Qing dynasty of China (before the First Sino-Japanese War) and the Empire of Japan.

== China ==
The treaty ports were designated Chinese cities that were opened to foreign trade and residence by the unequal treaties, and lasted for approximately one hundred years. The Treaty of Nanking established the first treaty port, and the Second Opium War gave rise to a second group of treaty ports. At its peak, more than 80 treaty ports were established in China; initially by Britain, France, and the United States; but soon expanding to all of the major foreign powes by the end of the 19th century.

Treaty ports in the Qing Dynasty in 1911, color-coded by the decade in which they were opened.

For encyclopedic details on each treaty port, see Robert Nield's China's Foreign Places: The Foreign Presence in China in the Treaty Port Era, 1840–1943 (2015).

Current province or municipality	City	Date	Foreign concession holders
Shanghai	Shanghai	1842–1946	Greater Shanghai had three sections: the Shanghai International Settlement of the United Kingdom and the United States; the Shanghai Concession of France, the Old City of Shanghai
Jiangsu	Nanjing	1858	
Jiangsu	Zhenjiang		
Jiangxi	Jiujiang	1861–1929	United Kingdom, British Concession in Jiujiang
Hubei	Hankou (now part of Wuhan)	1858–1945	United Kingdom; later France, Germany, Empire of Japan, and Russia
Hubei	Shashi		Japan
Hubei	Yichang		
Hunan	Changsha	1937–1945	Japan
Hunan	Yuzhou		
Sichuan	Chongqing		
Zhejiang	Ningbo	1841–1842	United Kingdom
Zhejiang	Wenzhou	1876	United Kingdom
Fujian	Fuzhou	1842–1945	United Kingdom, then Japan
Fujian	Xiamen (Amoy)	1842–1912	United Kingdom
Guangdong	Guangzhou (Canton)	1842–1945	United Kingdom; then Japan
Guangdong	Shantou	1858	United Kingdom
Guangdong	Sanshui		
Guangdong	Haikou (Qiongshan)	1858	
Guangxi	Beihai	1876–1940s?	United Kingdom, United States, Germany, Austria-Hungary, France, Italy, Portugal, Belgium
Guangxi	Nanning		
Yunnan	Mengzi		
Yunnan	Simao		
Yunnan	Dengyue		
Shandong	Yantai		
Hebei	Tianjin	1860–1902	United Kingdom, United States, Russia, Germany, Austria-Hungary, France, Italy, Portugal, Belgium
Liaoning	Niuzhuang	1858	
Liaoning	Yingkou		
Liaoning	Shenyang		
Jilin	Changchun		
Jilin	Hunchun		
Heilongjiang	Harbin	1898–1946	Russia, United States, Germany; later Japan and the Soviet Union
Heilongjiang	Aihun		Russia, Soviet Union
Heilongjiang	Manzhouli		Russia, Soviet Union
New Taipei City	Tamsui	1862	
Tainan	Tainan	1858	France

== Japan ==
Japan opened two ports to foreign trade, Shimoda and Hakodate, in 1854 (Convention of Kanagawa), to the United States. In 1858, the Treaty of Amity and Commerce designated four more ports, Kanagawa, Hyogo, Nagasaki, and Niigata. The treaty with the United States was followed by similar ones with Britain, the Netherlands, Russia, and France. The ports permitted legal extraterritoriality for citizens of the treaty nations. The system of treaty ports ended in Japan in the year 1899 as a consequence of Japan's rapid transition to a modern nation. Japan had sought treaty revision earnestly, and in 1894, signed a new treaty with Britain which revised or abrogated the previous "unequal" treaty. Other countries signed similar treaties. The new treaties came into force in July 1899.

== Korea ==
Following the Ganghwa Treaty of 1876, the Korean kingdom of Joseon agreed to the opening of three strategic ports and the extension of legal extraterritoriality to merchants from Meiji Japan. Chinese merchants also entered Korea in earnest after the Qing army was sent to suppress the Imo Incident in 1882. The first port opened in this manner was Busan, while Incheon and Wonsan followed shortly thereafter. These cities became important centers of mercantile activity for traders from China and Japan until Korea's colonization by Japan in 1910.

== See also ==
- Economic history of China before 1912
- Shanghai International Settlement
- Unequal treaties
- Chinese concession of Incheon
- Foreign concessions in China
- List of Chinese treaty ports
- Bases for destroyers
