= New Youth =

1915–26 Chinese counter-cultural literary magazine

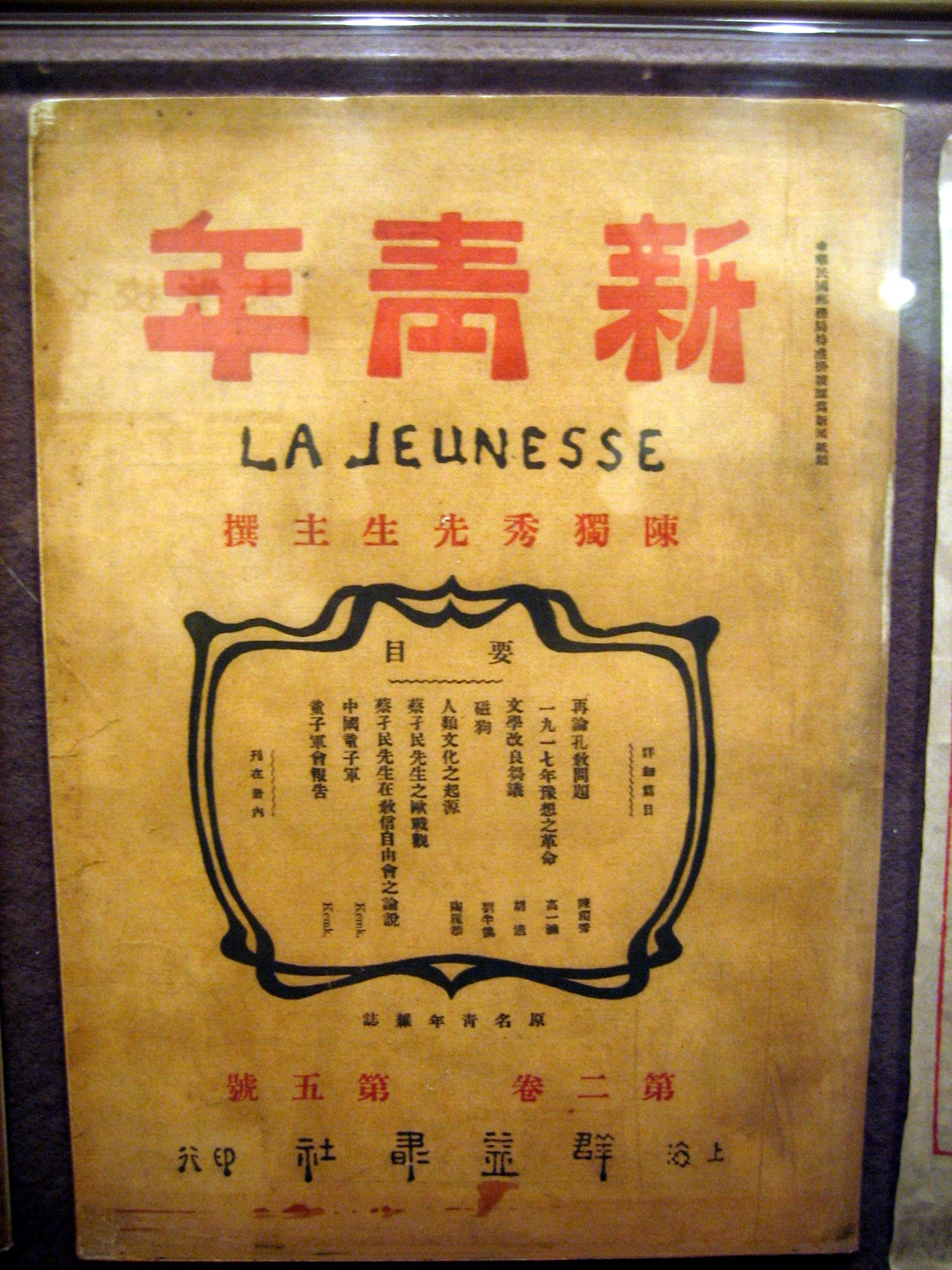
- Traditional Chinese: 新靑年
- Simplified Chinese: 新青年
Transcriptions
Standard Mandarin
- Hanyu Pinyin: Xīn Qīngnián
- Wade–Giles: Hsin^{1} Chʻing^{1}-nien^{2}

New Youth, also known as La Jeunesse, was a Chinese literary magazine founded by Chen Duxiu and published between 1915 and 1926. It strongly influenced both the New Culture Movement and the later May Fourth Movement.

== Publishing history ==
Chen Duxiu founded Youth Magazine (青年雜誌, later renamed New Youth) in 1915 in Shanghai, with the initial aim of spreading new thoughts and cultures—especially Western ideals of democracy and science—in order to promote the modernization of Chinese society. He created the magazine with the hope that young people would express their opinions and thoughts to help save China, and that authors could offer new thoughts for young people at that time. He also sought to advocate for a literary revolution by promoting the use of vernacular Chinese instead of classical Chinese, making literature more accessible to the general public. Another factor in his founding of the magazine was his desire to enlighten the youth; he considered them as the future of the nation, and he therefore wanted to foster in them a sense of patriotism and social responsibility. Chen also aimed to critique feudal traditions and promote individual freedom and equality, driving social reform and progress.

Chen approached Wang Mengzhou, the manager of the publishing house Yadong Library, with the idea of the magazine. The library could not fund the magazine, and Wang therefore suggested that Chen approach Qunyi Publishing House to print and publish the magazine. Qunyi Publishing House agreed to do so and paid Chen 200 yuan per month for manuscripts and editing.

In September 1916 Youth Magazine was renamed New Youth after the Shanghai YMCA complained that the name was too similar to their own. Historians have inferred from this that "the word 'new' was added to match the name with its advocacy of new ideas and culture." Chen Duxiu agreed to the name change, possibly to avoid conflict, or to give the magazine a fresh and distinctive identity that aligned with its mission of promoting new thoughts and culture.

The term "youth" was not originally part of the Chinese lexicon. It was introduced by missionaries around the turn of the 20th century. The YMCA, which was established globally in 1844 and introduced to China in 1876, had a significant influence on the use of the term. The YMCA's focus on youth work and publications aimed at educating and influencing young people underscored the term's adoption in Chinese society.

New Youth's headquarters moved to Beijing in January 1917 when Chen was appointed Chairman of the Chinese Literature Department at Peking University. The team of editors and authors gradually expanded. In Volume 3 of the magazine, senior scholars such as Zhang Shizhao, Cai Yuanpei, and Qian Xuantong were added to the group of authors. There were also contributions from young students such as Yun Daiying, Mao Zedong, Chang Naide, and Huang Lingshuang. In August 1917, after the publication of the third volume of New Youth, Qunyi Publishing House found it difficult to continue publishing because of the magazine's limited distribution and poor sales, and suspended publication. After Chen Duxiu's vigorous negotiation, the publishing house reluctantly agreed to renew the publication at the end of the year. In January 1918, New Youth was republished after a 4-month hiatus. Contributors to Volume 4 included Zhou Zuoren, Shen Yinmo, Shen Jianshi, Chen Daqi and Wang Xingqiong. Volume 6 was edited by Chen Duxiu, Qian Xuantong, Gao Yihan, Hu Shih, Li Dazhao, Shen Yinmo, all of whom were professors at Peking University. Thus, New Youth was transformed from a local publication dominated by writers from Anhui to a "national" publication dominated by Peking University professors. Those editors initiated the New Culture Movement, promoting science, democracy, and Vernacular Chinese literature.

Influenced by the 1917 Russian October Revolution, New Youth increasingly began to promote Marxism, becoming progressively more aligned with the communist movement. Especially after Chen Duxiu's contact with Grigori Voitinsky in 1920, New Youth took on a Marxist character and started using the logo of the Socialist Party of America on the cover of its magazine. The trend accelerated after the departure of Hu Shih, who later became Education Minister of the Republic of China. Beginning with the 1 September 1920 issue, New Youth began to openly support communism when its editorial office was moved back to Shanghai. In 1921, Chen Duxiu became a cofounder of the Chinese Communist Party and with the June 1923 issue, New Youth became the official Chinese Communist Party theoretical journal. New Youth was shut down in 1926 by the Nationalist government, but over its history influenced thousands of Chinese young people, including many leaders of the Chinese Communist Party.

== Notable contributors ==
=== Chen Duxiu ===
Chen Duxiu established New Youth in response to the failure of the Anhui Common Speech Journal, which published for only two years. After that, Chen divided his time between Japan and China as the Qing Dynasty lost power, waiting for an opportunity to engage in Chinese politics. Three years after the fall of the Qing Dynasty in 1912, Chen Duxiu founded New Youth, also serving as its editor in its early years. The magazine's editorial policies clearly reflected his personal values by supporting the new and growing vernacular literature movement and the revolution against established societal norms, Confucian values, and the use of Classical Chinese. Chen was the leader of the May Fourth Movement student demonstrations in 1919 and was a founding member of the Chinese Communist Party.

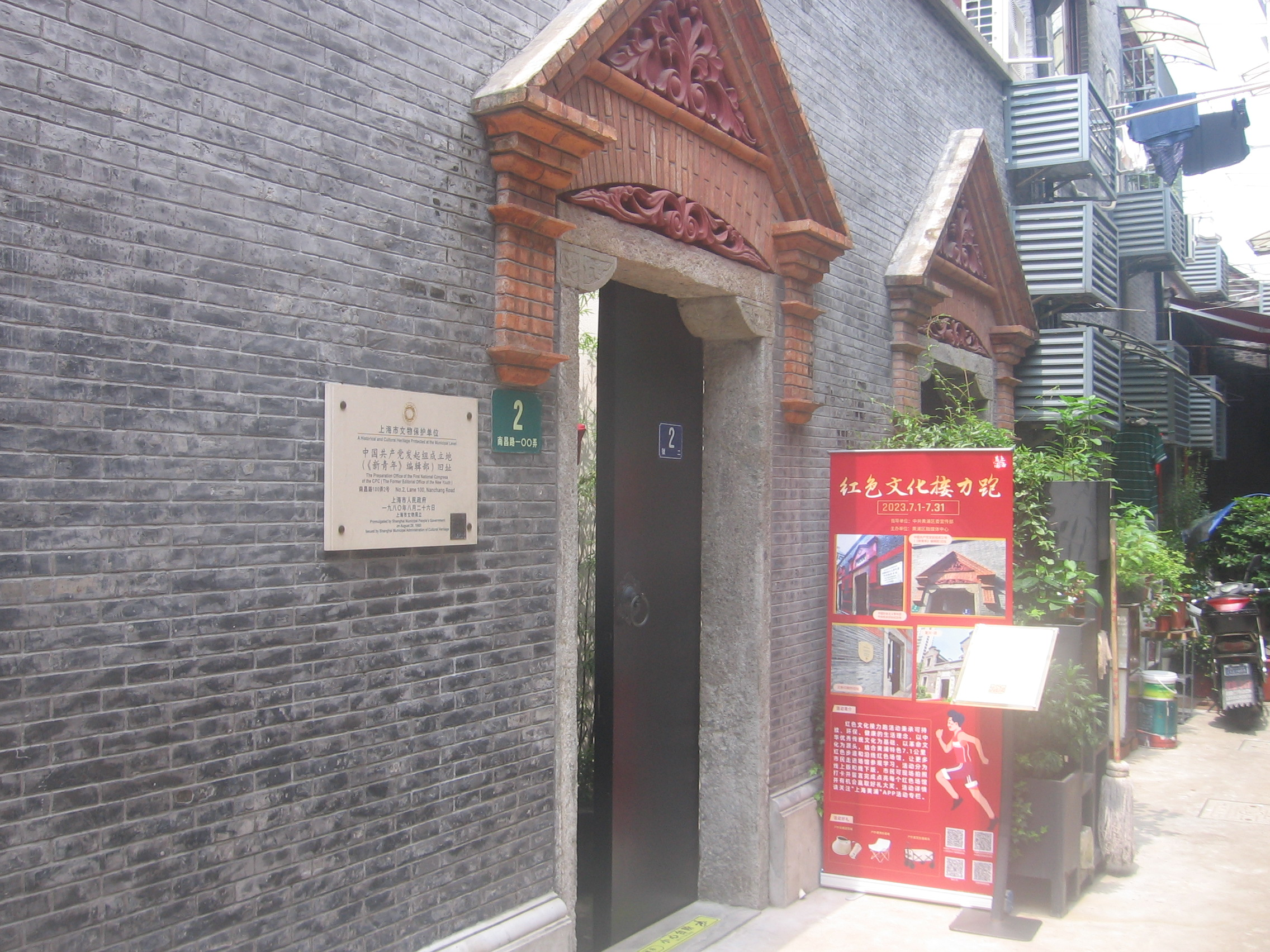
Former Editorial Office of the New Youth in Shanghai

Chen published "A Letter to Youth" (Chinese: 敬告青年) in the first issue of 15 September 1915. The letter issued six challenges:

- Be independent and not enslaved (自由的而非奴隸的)
- Be progressive and not conservative (進步的而非保守的)
- Be in the forefront and not lagging behind (進取的而非退隱的)
- Be internationalist and not isolationist (世界的而非鎖國的)
- Be practical and not rhetorical (實利的而非虛文的)
- Be scientific and not superstitious (科學的而非想象的)

The letter further emphasized the urgency of pursuing science and liberty in order to remove the twin chains of feudalism and ignorance from the general population.

=== Chen Hengzhe ===
Chen Hengzhe (Chinese: 陳衡哲; 1890 – 1976) was the first Chinese female professor at Peking University and the country's first professor of Western history. She was among the first ten women to study overseas on government scholarships, graduating from Vassar College and the University of Chicago. She was the first Chinese person to publish a history of the Western world that was not translated from a foreign language. She wrote the first published work of vernacular Chinese fiction: her short story "One Day" (Chinese: 一日), published 1917 in an overseas student quarterly (Chinese: 留美學生季報). This was a year before the publication of Lu Xun's "Diary of a Madman", which has often been incorrectly credited as the first vernacular Chinese fiction. Her short story "Little Raindrop" (Chinese: 小雨點), published in September 1920 in the eighth volume of New Youth, was the first Chinese children's story to be published in the new style. She also published a collection of her works entitled Raindrops in 1928.

=== Hu Shih ===
Hu Shih (Chinese: 胡適; 1891 – 1962) was a highly influential Chinese intellectual of the 20th century. He frequently published speeches at Peking University, amongst other venues. Over his lifetime, Hu authored 44 books and numerous articles, establishing significant influence. Hu promoted family planning, female equality, free marriage, and reproductive freedom. He was one of the early editors of New Youth and published a landmark article "Essay on Creating a Revolutionary `New Literature" (Chinese: 建設的文學革命論) in 18 April 1918 issue. He wrote that the mission of this language revolution is "a literature of the national language (Guoyu, Chinese: 國語), a national language of literature" (Original Text: 國語的文學，文學的國語。). Hu then went on to reason that for thousands of years, the written language was bound by scholars using Classical Chinese, a dead language. The vernacular, on the other hand, is living and adapts to the age. He urged authors to write in the vernacular in order to describe life as it is, reasoning that Chinese literature had a limited range of subject matter because it used a dead language. Using a living language would therefore open up a wealth of material for writers. He also argued that large-scale translations of western works would both increase the range of Chinese literature and serve as examples to emulate. This was a seminal and prescient essay about the modern Chinese language. Hu Shih was an important figure in the transformation of the modern Chinese written and printed language.

In the 15 July issue, Hu published an essay entitled, "Chastity" (Chinese: 貞操問題). In the traditional Chinese context, this refers not only to virginity before marriage, but specifically to women remaining chaste before they marry and after their husband's death (Chinese: 守貞). He wrote that this is an unequal and illogical view of life, that there is no natural or moral law upholding such a practice, that chastity is a mutual value for both men and women, and that he vigorously opposes any legislation favoring traditional practices on chastity. (There was a movement to introduce traditional Confucian value systems into law at the time.) Hu Shih also wrote a short play on the subject (see Drama section below).

Hu Shih's views were quite radical for the time, which was only a short six years after the overthrow of the Chinese imperial system. The Xinhai Revolution, as it was called, created two branches in the 1920s: the Nationalist (Kuomintang) and Chinese communist parties. Hu tried to focus the editorial policy on literature. Chen Duxiu and others insisted on addressing social and political issues. Hu was a lifelong establishment figure in the Nationalist government and left La Jeunesse when its communist direction became clear.

=== Lu Xun ===
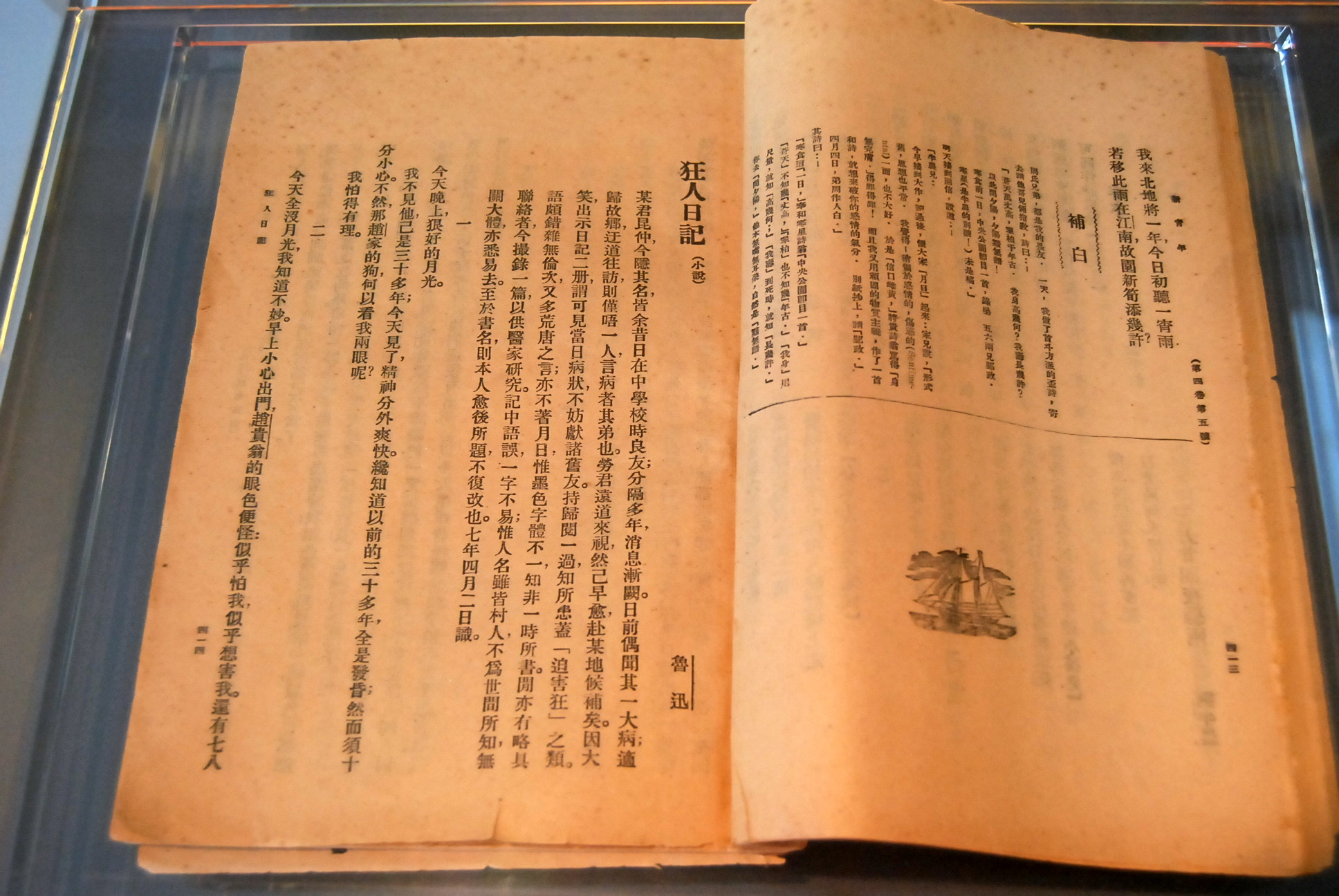
"Diary of a Madman" published in New Youth on May 15, 1918

Lu Xun (Chinese: 魯迅; 1881 – 1936) was an important contributor to the magazine. His first short story, "Diary of a Madman" (Chinese: 狂人日記), was inspired by Nikolai Gogol's story of the same name, and was published in 1918. The short story was a new form in Chinese literature at that time, and this was one of the first published. "Diary of a Madman" records a scholar's growing suspicion that the Confucian classics brainwash people into cannibalism. Lu Xun symbolized the cruel and inhumane nature of traditional Chinese society's structure in this manner. Despite being a harsh metaphor, it was not seen as exceptional; many indictments of the old society were equally scathing. The madness in the story not only indicates a self-consciousness that is radically modern in breaking with a tradition, but also demarcates an oppositional and new symbolic practice and order. "Diary of a Madman" was republished in Lu's first collection, A Call to Arms (Chinese: 吶喊), which also included his most well known novella, The True Story of Ah Q (Chinese: 阿Q正傳). Other fiction by Lu Xun published in La Jeunesse includes "Kong Yiji" (Chinese: 孔乙己) and "Medicine" (Chinese: 藥).

=== Li Dazhao ===
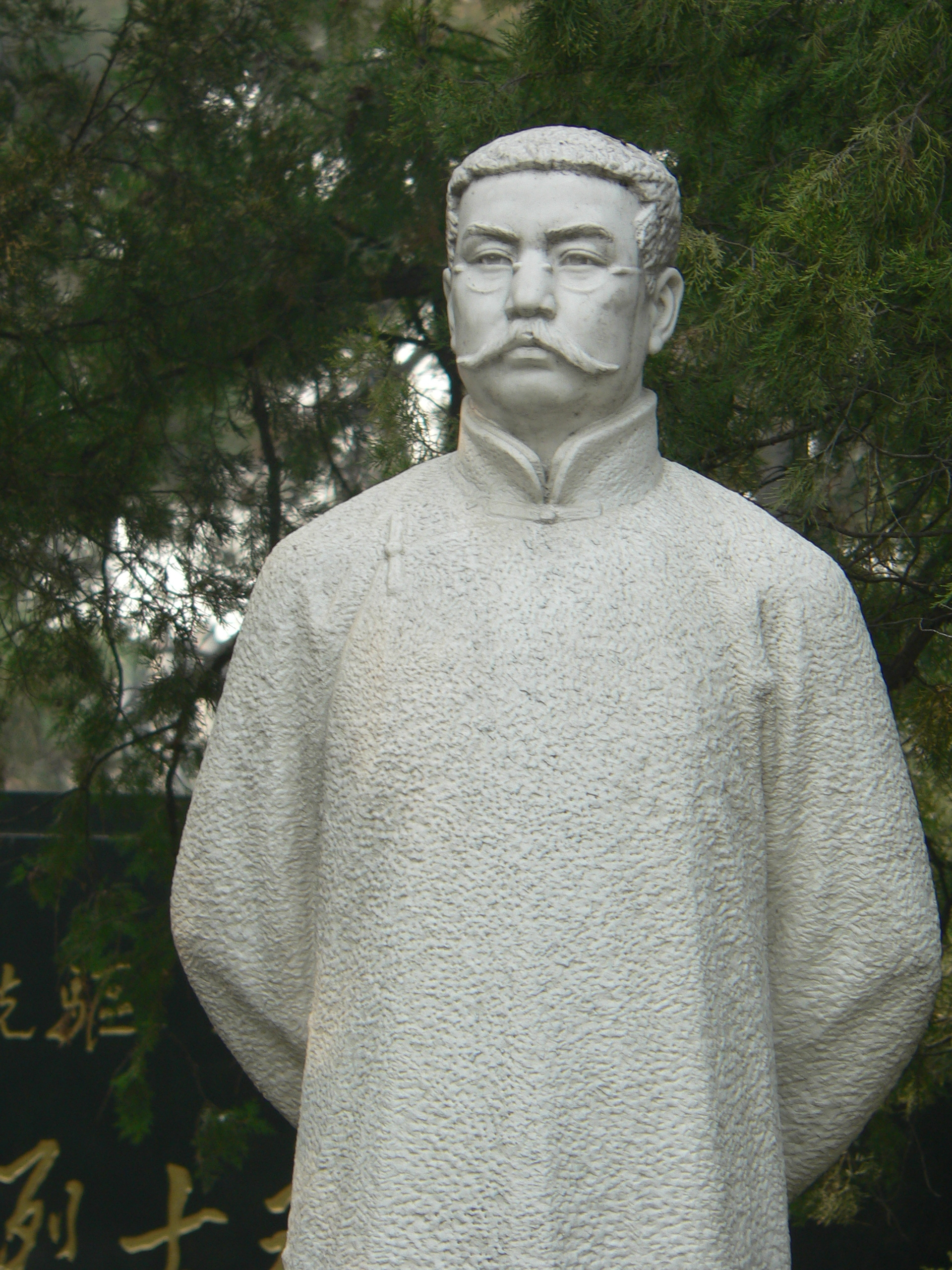
Li Dazhao

Li Dazhao (simplified Chinese: 李大钊; traditional Chinese: 李大釗; 1889 – 1927), had played an important role in the New Culture Movement and would soon become a cofounder of the Chinese Communist Party. He was the magazine's chief collaborator with the Chinese Communist Party, and published, among other things, an introduction to Marxist theory in the May 1919 issue of New Youth. In it, he argued that China, while not possessing a significant urban proletariat, could be viewed as an entire nation that had been exploited by capitalist imperialist countries. In April 1927, the 38-year-old Li was arrested and then killed by a warlord in Peking University.

=== Mao Zedong ===
Mao Zedong (simplified Chinese: 毛泽东; traditional Chinese: 毛澤東; 1893 – 1976), the founding father of the People's Republic of China, contributed articles against the oppression of women under Confucianism and on the importance of physical fitness to the magazine in his youth. "The well-known quotation of Mao Zedong (1893–1976), cited above, which compares young people to the morning sun, claimed for youth the authority to define the nation’s future and endowed it with all the power to make changes that would revolutionize society."

=== Liu Bannong ===
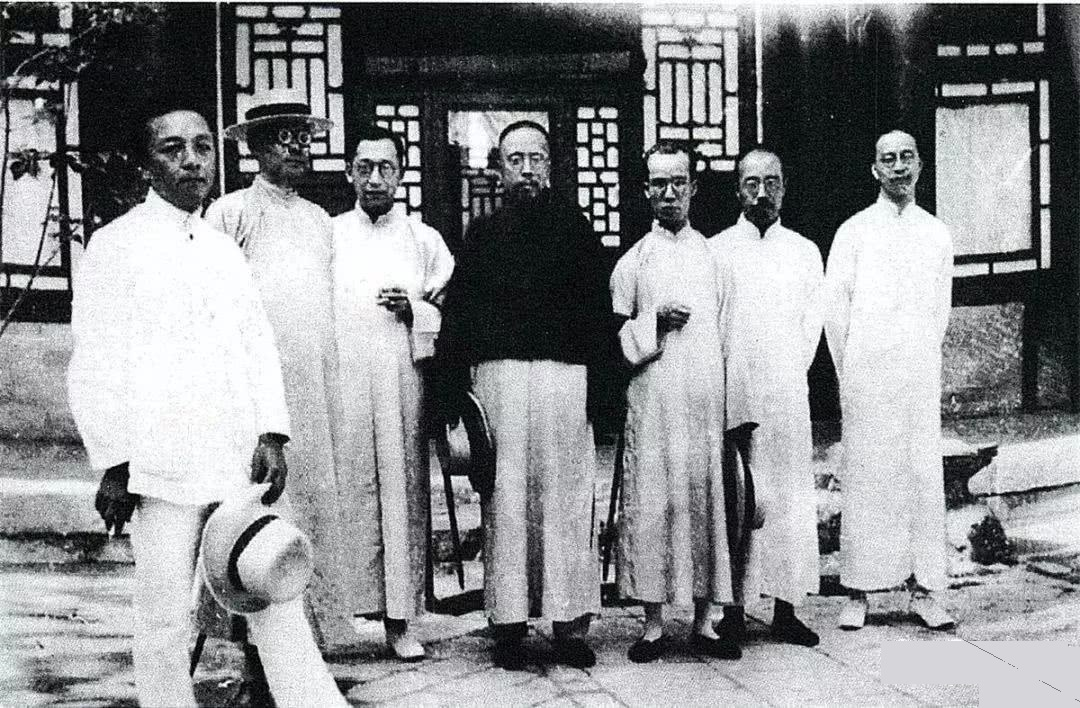
A group photo of the early teachers of Peking University. From left: Liu Bannong, Shen Yinmo, Chen Daqi, Ma Yuzao, Zhang Fengju, Zhou Zuoren, Li Xuanbo.

Liu Bannong (simplified Chinese: 刘半农; traditional Chinese: 劉半農; 1891 – 1934) was an important contributor to the magazine starting from 1916, invited by Chen Duxiu. His article "My View on Literary Reform: What is literature?" (我之文學改良觀) was published in La Jeunesse in 1917. In it, he made suggestions on both the content and the form of literary reform.

== Significant articles ==
=== "The Draft of Literature Revolution" ===
The ideas behind Hu Shi's literary revolution were rooted in his various personal experiences. Initially, it was the pamphlets from Zhong Wen'ao, a secretary at Tsinghua University's student supervision office, that sparked his thoughts on Chinese script reform. In 1915, he discussed the issue of romanizing Chinese characters with his friend Zhao Yuanren. However, Hu believed that Chinese characters, as an educational medium, could not be abolished, leading him to propose that teaching methods be improved. The real motivation for Hu to consider replacing classical Chinese with vernacular Chinese came from his discussions with friends like Mei Guangdi and Ren Shuyong at Ithaca from the summer of 1915 to August 1916. These debates made Hu more radical, leading him to propose the slogan "literary revolution," which he first mentioned in a poem in 1915. Despite opposition from Mei and others, Hu became more convinced of the potential of vernacular literature and decided to stop writing in classical Chinese, focusing instead on vernacular poetry.

On 1 January 1917, Volume 2, Number 5, Hu Shi published "Wen xue gai liang chu yi", which put "not avoiding vulgar words and phrases" at the end, with the purpose of "solemnly putting forward my proposition of vernacular literature", and ultimately came to the conclusion that "vernacular literature will be the authentic literature of China", which became the "fuse" that ignited the "Literary Revolution". Wen xue gai liang chu yi was published in New Youth, Vol. 2, No. 5, and the correspondence between Hu and Chen in Vol. 2, No. 2, already reveals the mystery. Hu Shih's letter briefly mentions his proposed literary revolution, which "must begin with eight things:" not to use diction, not to use stereotyped phrases, not to speak of counterpoints, not to avoid vulgar words and phrases, to emphasize the structure of grammar, not to make a sickly speech or be excessively sentimental, not to use classical expressions, and to be meaningful. He had some doubts about the fifth and eighth items, but said "The rest of the six things, they all join hands in admiration".

=== "A Madman's Diary" ===
On 15 May 1918, Volume 4, Number 5, Lu Xun published his first vernacular fiction, "A Madman's Diary" in New Youth. Lu Xun's works in New Youth are mainly a critique of nationalism, a loving compassion for distorted life, and a sense of self-torture and self-sacrifice. In these levels of expression, an extremely vivid discourse of self-examination is formed. A Madman's Diary aesthetically creates a rhetoric of freedom contrary to the eight-legged literary style, introducing elements of modernity into the expression of the mother tongue in strangeness and tearing. Rather than closing off the mother tongue, it reopens the door to it. Traditional meaningful forms wormed their way to life under its pen.

=== "Plea to a crime" (罪案之答辯書) ===
"An Open Letter to the Youth" is the inaugural work of "Youth Magazine." In this article, Chen Duxiu expresses his earnest hopes for the youth, emphasizing their crucial role in the nation's survival and urging them to be conscious and courageous in their endeavors. He advocates for the equal importance of science and human rights, marking the beginning of the New Culture Movement and sounding its clarion call. Chen critiques Confucianism and other feudal theories and morals, while promoting democracy and opposing feudal autocracy. He champions a scientific attitude, rejects superstition, and underscores the need to use scientific rationality to address social issues, arguing that superstition is a root cause of national decline. Chen propositions aim to dismantle traditional beliefs, establish independent and autonomous character, and drive social progress.

In 1919, Vol. 6, No. 1, Chen Duxiu published "Zui an zhi da bian shu", and the "Da bian shu", which contained the following passage about Democracy (Mr. De) and Science (Mr. Sai):

"My fellow-citizens were originally innocent, but it was only because of their support for Mr. Democracy and Mr. Science that they committed these monstrous sins. To support Mr. De one has to oppose Confucianism, ritual, chastity, old ethics, and old politics; to support Mr. Sai, one has to oppose old art and old religion; to support Mr. De and Mr. Sai, one has to oppose the national essence and old literature. If you think about it carefully and calmly, do you know if there are any other crimes in this magazine apart from supporting Mr. De and Mr. Sai? If not, please do not to make special difficulties for this magazine, but to have the strength and courage to oppose Mr. De and Mr. Sai is the only way to be considered a good man, the only way to be considered fundamental."

This passage has been quoted repeatedly by later historians. A closer look at Chen's argument suggests that support for Mr. De and Mr. Sai was the basic position of the New Youth, and that opposition to old ethics, old politics, old art, old religion, old literature, and other specific ideas were all based on this principle. Since the late Qing Dynasty, the concepts of democracy (civil rights, constitutionalism, republicanism) and science have been repeatedly advocated by the people of China (with different emphasis in different periods), and have become mainstream discourse among intellectual circles in the May Fourth Period.

== Poetry, drama, and other fiction ==
Though perhaps most famous for publishing short fiction, La Jeunesse also published vernacular poetry and drama. Hu Shih's "Marriage" (Chinese: 終身大事) was one of the first dramas written in the new literature style. Published in the March 1919 issue (Volume 6 Number 3), this one-act play highlights the problems of traditional marriages arranged by parents. The female protagonist eventually leaves her family to escape the marriage in the story.

Poems published included those by Li Dazao (Chinese: 李大釗), Chen Duxiu (Chinese: 陳獨秀), Lu Xun (Chinese: 魯迅), Zhou Zuoren (Chinese: 周作人), Yu Pingbo (Chinese: 俞平伯), Kang Baiqing (Chinese: 康白情), Shen Jianshi (Chinese: 沈兼士), Shen Xuanlu (Chinese: 沈玄廬), Wang Jingzhi (Chinese: 汪靜之), Chen Hengzhe (Chinese: 陳衡哲), Chen Jianlei (Chinese: 陳建雷), among others.

== Ideological tendency ==
New Youth fought against the feudalistic and revivalist literati and other feudalistic literary trends. This mainly included the struggle against the feudal revivalist forces of the "Wenxuan School" (Chinese: 文選派) and the "Tongcheng School" (Chinese: 桐城派) represented by Liu Shipei and Lin Qinnan, who opposed the vernacular language and defended the literary language, and opposed the new morality and defended the old morality. Chen Duxiu wrote "Zui an zhi da bian shu", in which he frankly admitted that New Youth had "undermined propriety and religion," among other things. He believed that only Mr. De (Democracy) and Mr. Sai (Science) could save China from all the darkness in politics, morality, academics and ideology. On behalf of the magazine, Chen Duxiu swore, "If I support these two gentlemen, I will not shirk all government oppression, social attacks and ridicule, or even the breaking of my head and the shedding of blood".

New Youth "at first advocated literary revolution, but later turned to communism". The ideological orientation of the magazine before 1918 was basically that of the old democratic revolution. The victory of the October Revolution aroused a strong interest in Marxism among the Chinese advanced elements, and the intellectuals quickly accepted and studied Marxism, using the proletarian worldview as a tool for observing the destiny of the country. The publication of New Youth, Volume 5, No. 5, published on 15 October 1918, contained Li Dazhao's "Shu min de sheng li"(Chinese: 庶民的胜利) and "Triumph of Bolshevism" (Chinese: Bolshevism的胜利), which produced a significant reaction among the advanced elements and progressive young students in China. The social trends after the May Fourth Movement, and the increasing radicalization of the academic world, made it difficult for the magazine to be confined to university campuses. On 1 September 1920 (Vol. 8, No. 1), it was reorganized as the organ of the Shanghai Initiation Group of the Chinese Communist Party.

== Reviews and impacts ==
Hu Shih wrote a letter to a friend in 1923: "In the past 25 years, there have only been three magazines that can represent three eras. It can be said that three new eras have been created: one is Current Affairs Daily, one is Xinmin Congbao, and one is New Youth." The new era created by New Youth refers to the era of democratic science.

New Youth had great appeal to the young Mao Zedong, primarily due to the fact that it promoted and advocated democratic science. In 1936, Mao Zedong recalled: "I started reading this magazine (referring to New Youth) when I was studying in Normal University. I admired the articles of Hu Shih and Chen Duxiu very much. They replaced Liang Qichao and Kang Youwei who had been abandoned by me. It became my role model for a while."

Zheng Zhenduo recalled in Chinese New Literature Series·Literary Debate Collection·Introduction that it was a youth magazine that advocated "moral, intellectual and physical" education, and was not different from other ordinary magazines at that time. He found that, apart from asking young people to establish a correct outlook on life, there was little practical content.

Guo Zhanbo published A History of Chinese Thought in the Last Fifty Years (Chinese: 近五十年中国思想史), in which he claimed that "from the New Youth, we can see the changes in his personal thought, and at the same time, we can see the changes in the world of thought at that time," formally confirming the self-expectation and self-positioning of the New Youth's colleagues. From then on, commenting on New Youth from the perspective of the history of ideas became the mainstream discourse in the academic world while the literary revolution, which was the most popular concern and the one with the most actual achievements, gradually faded out of the historians' view.

== Bibliography ==
- Chow, Tse-Tsung. The May Fourth Movement: Intellectual Revolution in Modern China. (Cambridge, MA: Harvard University Press, 1960). Detailed standard study of the movement, its leaders, and its publications.
- Feng, Liping (April 1996). "Democracy and Elitism: The May Fourth Ideal of Literature". Modern China (Sage Publications, Inc.) 22 (2): 170–196. ISSN 0097-7004. JSTOR 189342.
- Mitter, Rana. A Bitter Revolution: China's Struggle with the Modern World. (Oxford; New York: Oxford University Press, 2004). ISBN 0192803417. Follows the New Culture generation from the 1910s through the 1980s.
- Schwarcz, Vera. The Chinese Enlightenment: Intellectuals and the Legacy of the May Fourth Movement of 1919. Berkeley: University of California Press, 1986.
- Song, Mingwei (2017). "Inventing Youth in Modern China". In Wang, David Der-wei (ed.). A New Literary History of Modern China. Harvard, Ma: The Belknap Press of Harvard University Press. pp. 248–253. ISBN 978-0-674-97887-4.
- Spence, Jonathan D. The Search for Modern China, Norton(1999). ISBN 0-393-97351-4.
- Spence, Jonathan D. The Gate of Heavenly Peace, Viking Penguin. (1981) ISBN 978-0140062793. Attractively written essays on the men and women who promoted intellectual revolution in modern China.
