= Chen Hengzhe =

Chinese writer and professor (1890–1976)

- 陈衡哲
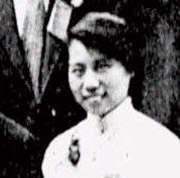
- Born: 12 July 1890; Wujin, Jiangsu Province, Great Qing
- Died: 1976 (aged 85–86); Shanghai, People's Republic of China
- Education: Vassar College, University of Chicago
- Occupations: Professor, writer
- Spouse: H. C. Zen
- Writing career
- Notable work: "One Day"
- Movement: New Culture Movement

Chen Hengzhe (simplified Chinese: 陈衡哲; traditional Chinese: 陳衡哲; pinyin: Chén Héngzhé; Wade–Giles: Ch'en Heng-che; 12 July 1890 – 1976), pen name Sophia H. Z. Chen (Chinese: 莎菲; pinyin: Shāfēi), was a pioneering writer in modern vernacular Chinese literature, a leader in the New Culture Movement, and the first female professor at a Chinese university. Chen is known for aiming to educate Chinese people by incorporating values from both Western culture and Chinese culture, producing many works reflecting these values.

== Life and education ==
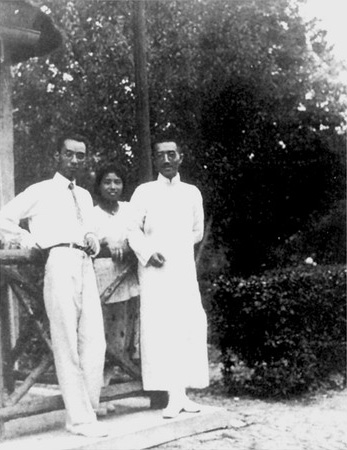
From left to right, H. C. Zen, Chen, and Hu Shih August 1920 in Nanking

Although Chen's family was from Hunan Province, she was born in Wujin, Jiangsu Province. Her parents encouraged her to follow the traditions of her extended scholarly family, but she could not find a school in which she could study formally. However, when she defied her father's choice for her husband, her paternal aunt took her in, tutored her, and found her a teaching position.

In 1911, she went to study in Shanghai and learned English. Tsinghua University set up examinations in Shanghai to send students overseas for study on Boxer Indemnity Scholarship Program. Despite the initial reluctance by the Chinese government to send women overseas, she successfully passed the examinations in 1914 along with ten other women, entering Vassar College to earn her BA in history and membership in Phi Beta Kappa. This opened the path for future Chinese women to be accepted into the program as well. She then went to the University of Chicago for her master's degree in history.

On a visit to Cornell University in 1916, she met Hu Shih, who was studying philosophy, and her future husband H. C. Zen (Ren Hongjun), who was studying chemistry. Returning to China in 1920, she taught Western history at Beijing University. Chen married Ren Hongjun on September 27, 1920. She and her husband had three children, a son, geologist E-An Zen, and two daughters. The eldest daughter, E-tu Zen Sun, earned a PhD at Harvard University under John K. Fairbank and published widely.

=== Role in the New Culture Movement and later career ===
The trip to Cornell in 1916 to meet her future husband and Hu Shih was a turning point for her. When the group of friends was drenched in a sudden downpour while rowing on Lake Cayuga, Ren composed a long poem in classical Chinese which Hu criticized for using "dead phrases of three thousand years ago" for such an everyday event. Chen and Hu took part in a "great pen war" over the use of classical Chinese. Chen's short story "One Day", based on college life at Vassar, was published in Chinese Students' Quarterly, and is known as the first short story in modern vernacular Chinese. "One Day" featured the use of realism and direct dialogue, which she described as "sincere and faithful" compared to previous fictional works with lots of detail.

Hu, a leader in the heated debates about establishing the new Chinese literature, wrote in the forward to her 1928 collection, entitled Raindrops:

In July and August of 1916, I had the most heated discussions about literature with Mei Renzhu [(梅光迪) Mei Guangdi]. She would not participate in this pen and ink warfare. But she sympathized with my ideas and gave me encouragement. She was my earliest comrade.

When we were discussing the new literature, Sophia was already writing in vernacular Chinese. "One Day" was the earliest work during those preliminary discussions about the literature revolution. "Raindrops" was also the earliest creative work during the "New Youth (Xin Qingnian)" period. After 1917, Sophia authored many vernacular poems. We should think about the conditions of that time regarding the new literature, think about when Lu Xun published his "Diary of a Madman", think about how few writers were using vernacular. We then can understand the proper place in the history of our new literature movement for these short stories by Sophia."

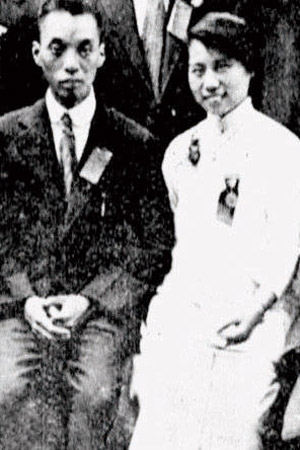
H. C. Zen and Chen Hengzhe

Returning to China in 1920, she taught Western history at Peking University. She was China's first female university professor. After she married Ren Hongjun in 1920, she worked for a time at Commercial Press. During this time, she published essays in key New Culture journals and the first textbook of western history. She also published articles in New Youth, Eastern Miscellany, and Fiction Monthly, many of them relating to becoming a "New Woman". In 1924, Chen published the first of the two-volume series of "History of the West" and the second in 1926. Her aim with this series was to help China become globalized and be recognized outside of the country. In 1930, she published "Short History of the European Renaissance". These publications gave readers information on the Western society that was being introduced into China. In 1932, she was one of eight founders, along with Hu, of the magazine of literary and political commentary, Duli Pinglun (Independent Critic), which published articles of a Western liberal orientation.

When her husband was made president of Sichuan University in 1935, she taught there briefly. But her critical essays in Duli Pinglun on Sichuan made her unwelcome, and she returned to Peking, only to flee at the onset of the war in 1937 to Shanghai, then Hong Kong, Kunming, and eventually Chongqing, the wartime capital. In 1936, she wrote her Autobiography of a Young Girl, where she highlights the events of her childhood. She expresses her struggles she had in her childhood and writes to show others how to take control of their own lives. Similarly with "History of the West" and "Short History of the European Renaissance", her readers could understand more about the Chinese and their traditions by reading her autobiography. She grew disillusioned with the Nationalist government, and she and her husband remained in Shanghai after the Communist victory in 1949. Her husband died in 1961. During the Cultural Revolution she suffered because of her ties to the United States.

Chen died in Shanghai in 1976.

== Representative publications ==
- "One Day" 一日, 1917 translated in Dooling, A.D., and K.M. Torgeson, eds. Writing Women in Modern China: An Anthology of Literature by Chinese Women from the Early Twentieth Century. Columbia University Press, 1998. pp. 90-99
- "Raindrops" 小雨点 a short story, 1917, in "New Youth (Xin Qingnian)"
- "Question of Rogers" 洛绮丝的问题
- "Raindrops" 小雨点 a collection, 1928, Xinyue 新月 publisher
- --, ed. Symposium on Chinese Culture. Shanghai, China: China Institute of Pacific Relations, 1932.
- "The Chinese Woman and Other Essays." (Peiping, 1933 Google Books.
- "A History of Renaissance" 《文艺复兴史》
- "Western History" 《西洋史》, Commercial Press Publisher
- "Autobiography of a Chinese Woman" 《一个中国女人的自传》
- "Sophia's Essays" 《衡哲散文集》
- "Short History of the European Renaissance"《欧洲文艺复兴小史》, 1930, Shanghai's Commercial Press
