= H. C. Zen =

Chinese politician and professor

H. C. Zen (Jen Hung-chun)
- Born: December 20, 1886
- Died: November 13, 1961 (aged 74)
- Education: Cornell University; Columbia University
- Known for: President of Sichuan University
- Spouse: Chen Hengzhe

H. C. Zen (simplified Chinese: 任鸿隽; traditional Chinese: 任鴻雋; pinyin: Rén Hóngjùn; Wade–Giles: Jen Hung-chün; 1886–1961) was a Chinese politician, academic and educator who served as president of National Sichuan University from 1935–1937. He was a professor of Chemistry and served as vice president of what is now Nanjing University from 1923–1925. He was a founding member of the Science Society of China, a major science organization in the modern history of China initiated by Chinese students at Cornell University in 1914, and served as its president from 1914 to 1923.

== Biography ==
He earned a Bachelor's in chemistry from Cornell in 1916 and a Master's from Columbia University in 1917.

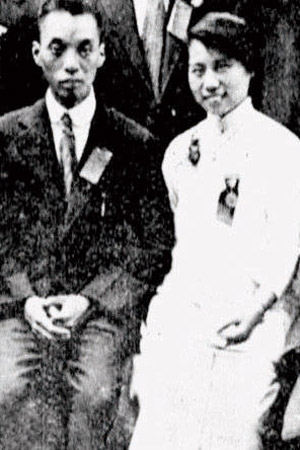
H. C. Zen (aka Ren Hongjun) and Chen Hengzhe

Prior to his studies in the United States, he served as the secretary of Sun Yat-sen, the founding father of the Republic of China while he was the Provisional President in 1912. During his lifetime, he had served in various government agencies and offices and had helped to promote science in China, including serving as secretary general of the Academia Sinica from 1938 to 1942.

He was married to Chen Hengzhe, who was the first woman to be a professor at a Chinese university. His eldest daughter was the historian E-tu Zen Sun. His son was geologist E-An Zen.
