= New Culture Movement =

Early 20th-century revolt against traditional Chinese values

- Traditional Chinese: 新文化運動
- Simplified Chinese: 新文化运动
Transcriptions
Standard Mandarin
- Hanyu Pinyin: Xīn Wénhuà Yùndòng
- Bopomofo: ㄒㄧㄣ ㄨㄣˊㄏㄨㄚˋ ㄩㄣˋㄉㄨㄙˋ
- Gwoyeu Romatzyh: Shin Wenhuah Yunndonq

The New Culture Movement (a Chinese language term; trans. in simplified Chinese: 新文化运动; traditional Chinese: 新文化運動; pinyin: Xīn Wénhuà Yùndòng) was a progressive sociopolitical movement in China during the 1910s and 1920s. Participants criticized many aspects of traditional Chinese society, favoring their substitution with new formulations of Chinese culture informed by modern and contemporary ideals of mass political participation. Arising out of disillusionment with traditional Chinese culture following the failure of the Republic of China to address China's problems, it featured scholars such as Chen Duxiu, Cai Yuanpei, Chen Hengzhe, Li Dazhao, Lu Xun, Zhou Zuoren, He Dong, Qian Xuantong, Liu Bannong, Bing Xin and Hu Shih, many of whom were classically educated, who led a revolt against Confucianism. The movement was launched by the writers of New Youth magazine, where these intellectuals promoted a new society based on unconstrained individuals rather than the traditional Confucian system. In 1917, Hu Shih put forward his famous "eight principles", which advocated for abandoning ancient traditional writing methods for ones that more accurately represented vernacular speech.

The New Culture Movement was the progenitor of the May Fourth Movement. On 4 May 1919, students in Beijing aligned with the movement protested the transfer of German rights over Jiaozhou Bay to Imperial Japan rather than China at the Paris Peace Conference (the meeting setting the terms of peace at the conclusion of World War I), transforming what had been a cultural movement into a political one.

== Major positions ==
The movement promoted:

1. Vernacular (Hu Shih's saying "Speak in the language of the time in which you live") instead of classical literature
2. The emancipation of women
3. The view that China is a nation among nations, not a uniquely Confucian culture
4. The re-examination of Confucian texts and ancient classics using modern textual and critical methods, known as the Doubting Antiquity School
5. Democratic and egalitarian values
6. A national orientation to the future rather than the past

In the view of the New Culture Movement, Confucian morality repressed the universal and natural experience of sexuality. They believed that sexuality was best considered in scientific terms.

== History ==
=== Background ===
Following the 1911 Revolution, Yuan Shikai’s ending of the second revolution of the summer of 1913 forced many intellectuals into exile, some fleeing to Tokyo, while others sought refuge in Shanghai. In Tokyo in May of 1914, Zhang Shizhao founded the political magazine The Tiger that, while being short-lived, running only between May of 1914 – October of 1915, was one of the most influential political journals in China of the time. Chen Duxiu, as well as other intellectuals who would later become a part of the New Culture Movement in China such as Li Dazhao contributed articles, poetry, letters, and more to The Tiger. The Tiger was known for “probing the fundamental spirit of politics”, and the writers of this magazine grappled with the question of how underlying cultural values and beliefs shape politics, which would become important during the New Culture Movement.

In 1915, Twenty-One Demands were issued, and six months later, it became evident that Yuan Shikai had the intention to restore the imperial system. In the same year, Chen Duxiu founded the Youth Magazine (青年雜誌 Qingnian zazhi), which was later retitled as New Youth (新青年 Xin qingnian), thus marking the beginning of what would become the New Culture Movement. In its initial stages, New Youth was only a small operation, but it would soon become much more influential than The Tiger had ever been. Some of the articles published in the New Youth that were most influential in instigating the movement include: "To Youth" (敬告青年 "jinggao qingnian"), "1916" (一九一六年 "yijiuyiliu nian"), and "Our Final Realization" (吾人最後之覺悟 "wuren zuihou zhi juewu"). In 1917, Chen Duxiu and Zhang Shizhao moved to Beijing University where they became acquainted with the other individuals who made up the community of the New Culture Movement.

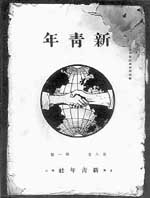
New Youth Magazine Cover

=== Rise ===
Two major centres of literature and intellectual activity were Beijing, home to Peking University and Tsinghua University, and Shanghai, with its flourishing publishing sector. The founders of the New Culture Movement clustered in Peking University, where they joined Cai Yuanpei, who served as chancellor. These founders include Chen Duxiu who served as the Dean of the School of Arts and Letters in addition to being founder of the New Youth, Li Dazhao as librarian, Hu Shih who was a leading figure in the literary revolution, the philosopher Liang Shuming, and the historian Gu Jiegang, among others.

Hu Shih had argued for the use of the modern written vernacular Chinese (白话文 baihuawen) in literature before and especially in his essay published by New Youth in January 1917 titled Preliminary Discussion on Literary Reform (文學改良芻議 wenxue gailiang chuyi) with the guideline: "Do not imitate the ancients." On April 18, 1918, he published the followed landmark article Constructive Literary Revolution – A Literature of National Speech (建设的文学革命论 jianshe de wenxue geming lun).

The first vernacular Chinese fiction was the female author Chen Hengzhe's short story One Day (一日 yi ri), published 1917 in an overseas student quarterly (《留美学生季报》 liumei xuesheng jibao). This was a year before the publication of Lu Xun's Diary of a Madman on April 2, 1918, and The True Story of Ah Q (second was not published until 1921), which has often been incorrectly credited as the first vernacular Chinese fiction.

=== Death of Yuan Shikai ===
Yuan Shikai, who inherited part of the Qing dynasty military after it collapsed in 1911, attempted to establish order and unity, but he failed to protect China against Japan, and also failed in an attempt to have himself declared emperor. When he died in 1916, the collapse of the traditional order seemed complete, and there was an intensified search for a replacement to go deeper than the changes of the previous generations, which brought new institutions and new political forms. Daring leaders called for a new culture, as the death of Yuan Shikai in June 1916 had opened the possibility of fundamental reform in the Chinese political sphere anew.

=== Literature ===
The literary output of this time was substantial, with many writers who later became famous (such as Mao Dun, Lao She, Lu Xun and Bing Xin) publishing their first works. For example, Lu Xun's essays and short fiction created a sensation with their condemnation of Confucian culture. "Diary of a Madman" directly implied that China's traditional culture was mentally cannibalistic, and The True Story of Ah Q showed typical Chinese people as weak and self-deceiving. Along with this musicians such as Yin Zizhong joined the movement through music.

The New Culture Movement promoted women writers and condemned feudal traditions which had inhibited women from pursuing literary careers.

=== Major figures ===
==== Chen Duxiu ====
Chen Duxiu founded the New Youth journal, which was a leading forum for debating the causes of China's weakness, as it laid the blame on Confucian culture. Chen Duxiu called for "Mr. Confucius" to be replaced by "Mr. Science" (賽先生; 赛先生; sài xiānsheng) and "Mr. Democracy" (德先生; dé xiānsheng)." These two were regarded as the two symbols of the New Culture Movement and also its legacy.

==== Hu Shih ====
Another outcome was the promotion of written vernacular Chinese over Literary Chinese, the predominant written form of the language since antiquity. The restructuring of national heritage first began when Hu Shih replaced traditional Confucian learning with a more modern construction of research on traditional culture. Hu Shih proclaimed that "a dead language cannot produce a living literature." In theory, the new format allowed people with little education to read texts, articles and books. He charged that Literary Chinese was understood by only scholars and officials (ironically, the new vernacular included many foreign words and Japanese neologisms (Wasei-kango), which made it difficult for many to read). Scholars, such as Y.R. Chao (Zhao Yuanren), began the study of the various Varieties of Chinese using tools of foreign linguistics. Hu Shih was among the scholars who used the textual study of Dream of the Red Chamber and other vernacular fiction as the basis for the national language. Literary societies such as the Crescent Moon Society flourished. Hu Shih was not only one of the founders of the movement but also considered the leader of the vernacular faction with his promotion of scientific methods. The "national language" has another social and political function: it facilitates intellectuals to enlighten, spread new ideas, and create new cultures. In Hu Shi's view, this is also the premise for the formation of modern state order.

Hu was among the influential New Culture Movement reformers who welcomed Margaret Sanger's 1922 visit to China. He personally translated her speech delivered at Beijing National University which stressed the importance of birth control. Periodicals The Ladies' Journal and The Women's Review published Hu's translation, which contributed to the public debate regarding birth control.

==== Li Dazhao ====
While serving as an editor for various newspapers and journals, Li Dazhao campaigned for a new culture and opposed the enshrinement of Confucianism in China's constitution, and implored Chinese people to defend the nascent republicanism. He wrote articles promoting Western civilization, constitutional rule, and endorsing democracy.

==== Cai Yuanpei ====
Cai Yuanpei was a Chinese philosopher, the Chancellor of Beijing University, and he was also a friend of Chen Duxiu. Cai Yuanpei was involved in the New Culture Movement, as well as other similar movements such as the May Fourth Movement.

Consistent with the New Culture Movement, Cai contended that divine authorities and superstitions should be overthrown. He also viewed religious aesthetics as containing major potential for achieving transcendence through appreciation of beauty.

=== Foreign influence ===
New Culture leaders and their followers now saw China as a nation among nations, not as culturally unique. A large number of foreign doctrines became fashionable, particularly those that reinforced the cultural criticism and nation-building impulses of the movement. Social Darwinism, which had been influential since the late nineteenth century, was especially shaping for Lu Xun, among many others, and was supplemented by almost every "ism" of the world. Cai Yuanpei, Li Shizeng, and Wu Zhihui developed a Chinese variety of anarchism. They argued that Chinese society had to undergo radical social change before political change would be meaningful. The pragmatism of John Dewey became popular, often through the work of Hu Shih, Chiang Monlin, and Tao Xingzhi. Dewey arrived in China in 1919, and spent the following year lecturing. Bertrand Russell also lectured widely to warm crowds. Lu Xun was associated with the ideas of Nietzsche, which were also propagated by Li Shicen, Mao Dun, and many other intellectuals of the time.

=== Death of Li Chao & Reigniting The Movement ===
During the height of the New Culture Movement in 1919, the tragic death of Li Chao, a student at the Beijing Higher Normal School for Women, became a major catalyst for anti-feudal and feminist agitation. Cut off from her family's wealth by her adopted brother Weichen and clan patriarchs for refusing a forced marriage and insisting on higher education, Li Chao died of tuberculosis in poverty on August 16, 1919. The posthumous publication of her private letters revealed the extent of systemic patriarchal oppression she faced, turning her into a martyr among radical students, early communists, and intellectuals demanding the abolition of Confucian family structures and the institution of equal rights and education for women. Hu Shih wrote articles on her in several newspapers and magazines, and even a biography on her. This reignited the movement among the activists once again. A public memorial for her was organized by the movement's activists, attended and organized by high profile figures including Cai Yuanpei, Hu Shih, and Li Dazhao, Luo Jialun, Kang Baiqing, Zhang Guotao, and Huang Rikui; as well as prominent female figures like Wu Ruonan. The memorial service took place on the afternoon of November 30, 1919, at the Women's Higher Normal School. The hall was packed with thousands of male and female guests. At the front of the venue hung a portrait of Li Chao with short hair and wearing a student uniform. Above the frame was a horizontal banner handwritten by Cai Yuanpei, written: "Her Will Cannot Be Stripped Away." Li Chao's case was discussed for weeks in progressive newspapers and magazines nationwide, and became a rallying cry for the movement. Many activists of the movement who were also early founding members of the Chinese Communist Party, like Deng Zhongxia, Li Dazhao, Zhang Guotao, Chen Duxiu and others were directly involved in organizing the memorial for Li Chao, and commemorating her. It is believed that her death catalyzed the communist party to introduce laws after they took over, that ensured women's education, liberty and right to marriage based on their own decisions.

=== Development and aftermath ===
When Cai Yuanpei, the principal of Beijing university, resigned on May 9, 1919, it had caused a huge uproar in the media across the country. This connected the academic discourse within the university with the political activism of the May Fourth demonstrations. The May Fourth Demonstrations of 1919 initially united the leaders but soon, there was a debate and falling out over the role of politics. Hu Shih, Cai Yuanpei, and other liberals urged the demonstrating students to return to the classroom, but Chen Duxiu and Li Dazhao, frustrated with the inadequacy of cultural change, urged more radical political action. They used their roles as Peking University faculty to organize Marxist study groups and the first meeting of the Chinese Communist Party.

Li called for "fundamental solutions", but Hu criticized it as abstract, calling for "more study of questions, less study of isms." The younger followers who followed Li and Chen into organized politics included Mao Zedong.

Other students heeded Hu Shih's call to return to their studies. The new approaches shaped scholarship for the next generation. The historian Gu Jiegang, for instance, pioneered the application of the New History he studied at Columbia University to classical Chinese texts in the Doubting Antiquity Movement. Gu also inspired his students in the study of Chinese folk traditions which had been ignored or dismissed by Confucian scholars. Education was high on the New Culture agenda. Cai Yuanpei headed a New Education Society, and university students joined the Mass Education Movement of James Yen and Tao Xingzhi which promoted literacy as a foundation for wider political participation.

Many of the leaders of the Kuomintang, such as Liao Zhongkai, Hu Hanmin and Dai Jitao as well as Communist members of the Kuomintang such as Li Dazhao, participated in the New Culture Movement. These figures played a major role in the restructuring of the Kuomintang along Soviet lines in 1922–1924.

==== Journalism and public opinion ====
Chinese newspaper journalism was modernized in the 1920s according to international standards, thanks to the influence of the New Culture Movement. The roles of journalist and editor were professionalized and became prestigious careers. The business side gained importance and with a greater emphasis on advertising and commercial news, the main papers in Shanghai such as Shenbao, moved away from the advocacy journalism that characterized the 1911 revolutionary period. Much of what they reported shaped narratives and realities amongst those who were interested in what was becoming the New Culture Movement. Outside the main centers the nationalism promoted in metropolitan dailies was not as distinctive as localism and culturalism.

In 1924, Indian Nobel Laureate Rabindranath Tagore held numerous lectures in China. He argued that China could encounter trouble by integrating too much progressive and foreign thoughts into Chinese society. Liberal ideals were a major component of the New Culture Movement. Democracy became a vital tool for those frustrated with the unstable condition of China whereas science became a crucial instrument to discard the "darkness of ignorance and superstition".

New Culture intellectuals advocated and debated a wide range of cosmopolitan solutions that included science, technology, individualism, music and democracy, leaving to the future the question of what organization or political power could carry them out. The anti-imperialist and populist violence of the mid-1920s soon overwhelmed New Culture intellectual inquiry and culture.

== Evaluations and changing views ==
Orthodox historians viewed the New Culture Movement as a revolutionary break with feudal thought and social practice and the seedbed of revolutionary leaders who created the Chinese Communist Party and went on to found the People's Republic of China in 1949. Mao Zedong wrote that the May 4th Movement "marked a new stage in China's bourgeois-democratic revolution against imperialism and feudalism" and argued that "a powerful camp made its appearance in the bourgeois-democratic revolution, a camp consisting of the working class, the student masses and the new national bourgeoisie."

Historians in the west also saw the movement as marking a break between tradition and modernity, but in recent decades, Chinese and foreign historians now commonly argue that the changes promoted by New Culture leaders had roots going back several generations and thus were not a sharp break with tradition, which, in any case, was quite varied, as much as an acceleration of earlier trends. Research over the last fifty years also suggests that while radical Marxists were important in the New Culture Movement, there were many other influential leaders, including anarchists, conservatives, Christians, and liberals.

The re-evaluation, while it does not challenge the high evaluation of the thinkers and writers of the period, does not accept their self-image as cultural revolutionaries.

Other historians further argue that Mao's communist revolution did not, as it claimed, fulfill the promise of New Culture and enlightenment but rather betrayed its spirit of independent expression and cosmopolitanism. Yu Yingshi, a student of the New Confucian Qian Mu, recently defended Confucian thought against the New Culture condemnation. He reasoned that late imperial China had not been stagnant, irrational and isolated, conditions that would justify radical revolution, but that late Qing thinkers were already taking advantage of the creative potential of Confucius.

Xu Jilin, a Shanghai intellectual who reflects liberal voices, agreed in effect with the orthodox view that the New Culture Movement was the root of the Chinese Communist Revolution but valued the outcome differently. New Culture intellectuals, said Xu, saw a conflict between nationalism and cosmopolitanism in their struggle to find a "rational patriotism", but the cosmopolitan movement of the 1920s was replaced by a "new age of nationalism". Like a "wild horse", Xu continued, "jingoism, once unbridled, could no longer be restrained, thus laying the foundations for the eventual outcomes of the history of China during the first half of the twentieth century."

== See also ==
- New Life Movement (1934)
- East-West Cultural Debate
- Total Westernization
- New Youth
- May Fourth Movement

== Bibliography ==
- Alitto, Guy (1979). The Last Confucian: Liang Shu-Ming and the Chinese Dilemma of Modernity. Berkeley: University of California Press. Biography of a conservative New Culture figure.
- Bary, Wm. Theodore de; Lufrano, Richard, compl. (2000) [1995]. Sources of Chinese Tradition: From 1600 through the Twentieth Century. Vol. 2 (2nd ed.). New York: Columbia University Press. ISBN 0-231-11271-8.
- Chow, Kai-wing, Beyond the May Fourth Paradigm: In Search of Chinese Modernity (Lanham: Lexington Books/Rowman & Littlefied, 2008). Essays on new aspects of the movement, including an Introduction which reviews recent re-thinking.
- Chow, Tse-tsung (2013) [1960]. The May Fourth Movement: Intellectual Revolution in Modern China. Harvard, Ma: Harvard University Press. ISBN 978-0-674-28340-4.
- Dirlik, Arif (1991). Anarchism in the Chinese Revolution. Berkeley: University of California Press. ISBN 0520072979. Revisionist study showing the influence of anarchist programs.
- Doleželová-Velingerová, Milena; Oldřich Král; Graham Martin Sanders, eds. The Appropriation of Cultural Capital: China’s May Fourth Project. Cambridge, Ma: Harvard University Asia Center: 2001. Revisionist study.
- Egan, Susan Chan (2017). "Hu Shi and His Experiments". In Wang, David Der-wei (ed.). A New Literary History of Modern China. Harvard, Ma: The Belknap Press of Harvard University Press. pp. 242–247. ISBN 978-0-674-97887-4.
- Furth, Charlotte (1983). "Intellectual change: from the Reform movement to the May Fourth movement, 1895–1920". In Fairbank, John K. (ed.). Republican China 1912–1949, Part 1. The Cambridge History of China. Cambridge, Ma: Cambridge University Press. pp. 322–405. ISBN 978-0-521-23541-9.
- Grieder, Jerome B., Hu Shih and the Chinese Renaissance; Liberalism in the Chinese Revolution, 1917–1937 (Cambridge, Ma: Harvard University Press, 1970). Careful study of central figure.
- Hayford, Charles W., To the People: James Yen and Village China. New York: Columbia University Press, 1990. Early chapters describe the role of popular education in the New Culture.
- Hockx, Michel (2017). "The Big Misnomer: 'May Forth Literature'". In Wang, David Der-wei (ed.). A New Literary History of Modern China. Harvard, Ma: The Belknap Press of Harvard University Press. pp. 265–270. ISBN 978-0-674-97887-4.
- Jin, Ha (2017). "Zhou Yucai writes 'A Madman's Diary' under the Pen Name Lu Xin". In Wang, David Der-wei (ed.). A New Literary History of Modern China. Harvard, Ma: The Belknap Press of Harvard University Press. pp. 254–259. ISBN 978-0-674-97887-4.
- Lanza, Fabio, Behind the Gate: Inventing Students in Beijing. New York: Columbia University Press, 2010. ISBN 978-0-231-15238-9. Study of student culture and institutions during the New Culture period.
- Leo Ou-fan Lee, Voices from the Iron House : A Study of Lu Xun (Bloomington: Indiana University Press, 1987). Biography and literary analysis.
- Yusheng Lin, The Crisis of Chinese Consciousness: Radical Antitraditionalism in the May Fourth Era (Madison: University of Wisconsin Press, 1979). Early critique of the New Culture Movement as "iconoclastic."
- Manela, Erez. The Wilsonian Moment: Self-Determination and the International Origins of Anticolonial Nationalism. Oxford and New York: Oxford University Press, 2007. Describes the global influences on Chinese youth.
- Maurice J. Meisner, Li Ta-Chao and the Origins of Chinese Marxism (Cambridge, Ma: Harvard University Press, 1967). Intellectual biography of key leader and co-founder of Chinese Communist Party.
- Rana Mitter, A Bitter Revolution: China's Struggle with the Modern World (Oxford; New York: Oxford University Press, 2004). Traces the fate of New Culture ideals through the rest of the century.
- Schwartz, Benjamin. "Themes in Intellectual History: May Fourth and After." In Cambridge History of China, Vol. 12, pt. 1: Republican China, 1912–1949, pp. 406–504. Cambridge, UK: Cambridge University Press, 1983. Overview of intellectual and cultural history.
- Schwarcz, Vera (1986). The Chinese Enlightenment: Intellectuals and the Legacy of the May Fourth Movement of 1919. Berkeley, Ca: University of California Press. ISBN 978-0-520-06837-7.
- Shan, Patrick Fuliang, Li Dazhao: China's First Communist, Albany: SUNY Press, 2024.
- Shan, Patrick Fuliang. Yuan Shikai: A Reappraisal, UBC Press, 2018.
- Song, Mingwei (2017). "Inventing Youth in Modern China". In Wang, David Der-wei (ed.). A New Literary History of Modern China. Harvard, Ma: The Belknap Press of Harvard University Press. pp. 248–253. ISBN 978-0-674-97887-4.
- Spence, Jonathan D. The Gate of Heavenly Peace: The Chinese and Their Revolution, 1895–1980. Includes many New Culture leaders and their experience of revolution.
- Weiping, Chen (April 3, 2017). "An Analysis of Anti-Traditionalism in the New Culture Movement". Social Sciences in China. 38 (2): 175–187. doi:10.1080/02529203.2017.1302243. ISSN 0252-9203. S2CID 151585204.
- Zarrow, Peter. Anarchism and Chinese Political Culture (New York: Columbia University Press, 1990).
