= E-tu Zen Sun =

Chinese historian

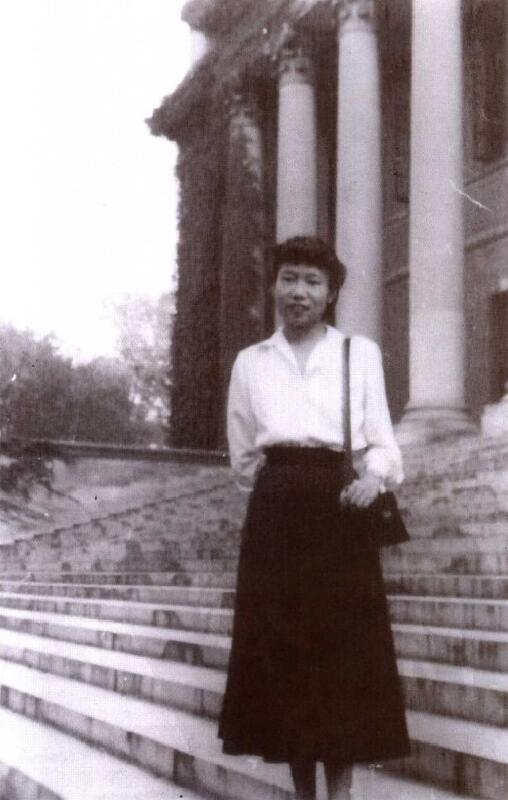
E-tu Zen Sun

E-tu Zen Sun (24 July 1921 – 28 June 2021) 孫任以都 was a historian, especially of "economic history of pre-20th century China."

The eldest daughter of Chen Hengzhe and H. C. Zen, she was born in Beijing. She arrived in the United States in 1941 and attended Vassar. She completed her PhD at Radcliffe under the supervision of John King Fairbank, on some of whose projects she also collaborated.

She was professor for many years at Pennsylvania State University, until retirement in 1988. She also served as president of the American Association of University Women State College from 1959 to 1961. With her husband Shiou-chuan Sun, a professor of engineering with a mining specialty, she produced the first English translation of Tiangong Kaiwu. This was the first time the work appeared in a European language.

== Selected publications ==
=== Translations ===
- Yingxing Song, E. Tu Zen Sun and Shiou-Chuan Sun, translate and edit, T'ien-Kung K'ai-Wu; Chinese Technology in the Seventeenth Century. (University Park: Pennsylvania State University, 1966). ISBN
- Minxiong Shi. The Silk Industry in Ch'ing China. (Ann Arbor: Center for Chinese Studies, University of Michigan, Michigan Abstracts of Chinese and Japanese Works on Chinese History; No. 5, 1976). ISBN

=== Articles and chapters ===
- —— (1948), "Chinese Student Opinion", Far Eastern Survey, 17 (15): 178–181, doi:10.2307/3022819, JSTOR 3022819
- —— (1950), "The Lease of Wei-Hai Wei", Pacific Historical Review, 19 (3): 277–283, doi:10.2307/3635592, JSTOR 3635592
- —— (1951), "The Shanghai-Hangchow-Ningpo Railway Loan of 1908", Far Eastern Quarterly, 10 (2): 136–150, doi:10.2307/2049093, JSTOR 2049093
- —— (1952), "Results of Culture Contact in Two Mongol-Chinese Communities", Southwestern Journal of Anthropology, 8 (2): 182–210, doi:10.1086/soutjanth.8.2.3628614
- —— (1952), "The Chinese Constitutional Missions of 1905-1906", The Journal of Modern History, 24 (3): 251–268, doi:10.1086/237519, JSTOR 1875482
- —— (1962), "The Board of Revenue in Nineteenth-Century China", Harvard Journal of Asiatic Studies, 24: 175–228, doi:10.2307/2718648, JSTOR 2718648
- —— (1965), "Wu Ch'i-Chün: Profile of a Chinese Scholar-Technologist", Technology and Culture, 6 (3): 394–406, doi:10.2307/3101786, JSTOR 3101786
- —— (1968), "Ch'ing Government and the Mineral Industries before 1800", The Journal of Asian Studies, 27 (4): 835–845, doi:10.2307/2051582, JSTOR 2051582
- —— (1974), "Chinese Schools in a Revolutionary Century", The Journal of General Education (University Park, Pa.), 26 (3): 179–186

=== Books ===
- E. Tu Zen Sun. Chinese Railways and British Interests, 1898-1911. (New York: King's Crown Press, Columbia University, 1954). ISBN
- with John Defrancis, ed., Bibliography on Chinese Social History; a Selected and Critical List of Chinese Periodical Sources. (New Haven: Institute of Far Eastern Languages, Yale University, 1952).
- with Ssŭ-Yü Têng and John King Fairbank, eds., China's Response to the West; a Documentary Survey, 1839-1923. (Cambridge: Harvard University Press, 1954). ISBN
- with Ssŭ-Yü Têng and John King Fairbank, eds.,. Research Guide for China's Response to the West : A Documentary Survey, 1839-1923. (Cambridge: Harvard University Press, 1954). ISBN
- with John Defrancis, eds., Chinese Social History; Translations of Selected Studies. (Washington: American Council of Learned Societies, American Council of Learned Societies. Studies in Chinese and Related Civilizations, No. 7, 1956). ISBN
- E. Tu Zen Sun. Chʻing Administrative Terms; a Translation of the Terminology of the Six Boards with Explanatory Notes. (Cambridge: Harvard University Press, Harvard East Asian Series, 7, 1961).
- " The Growth of the Academic Community, 1912-1914 " in Denis Crispin Twitchett and John King Fairbank, ed., The Cambridge History of China. (Cambridge [England];: Cambridge University Press, 1978). ISBN 9780521243278.
