= Diary of a Madman (Lu Xun short story) =

1918 short story by Chinese writer Lu Xun

- Short story by Lu Xun
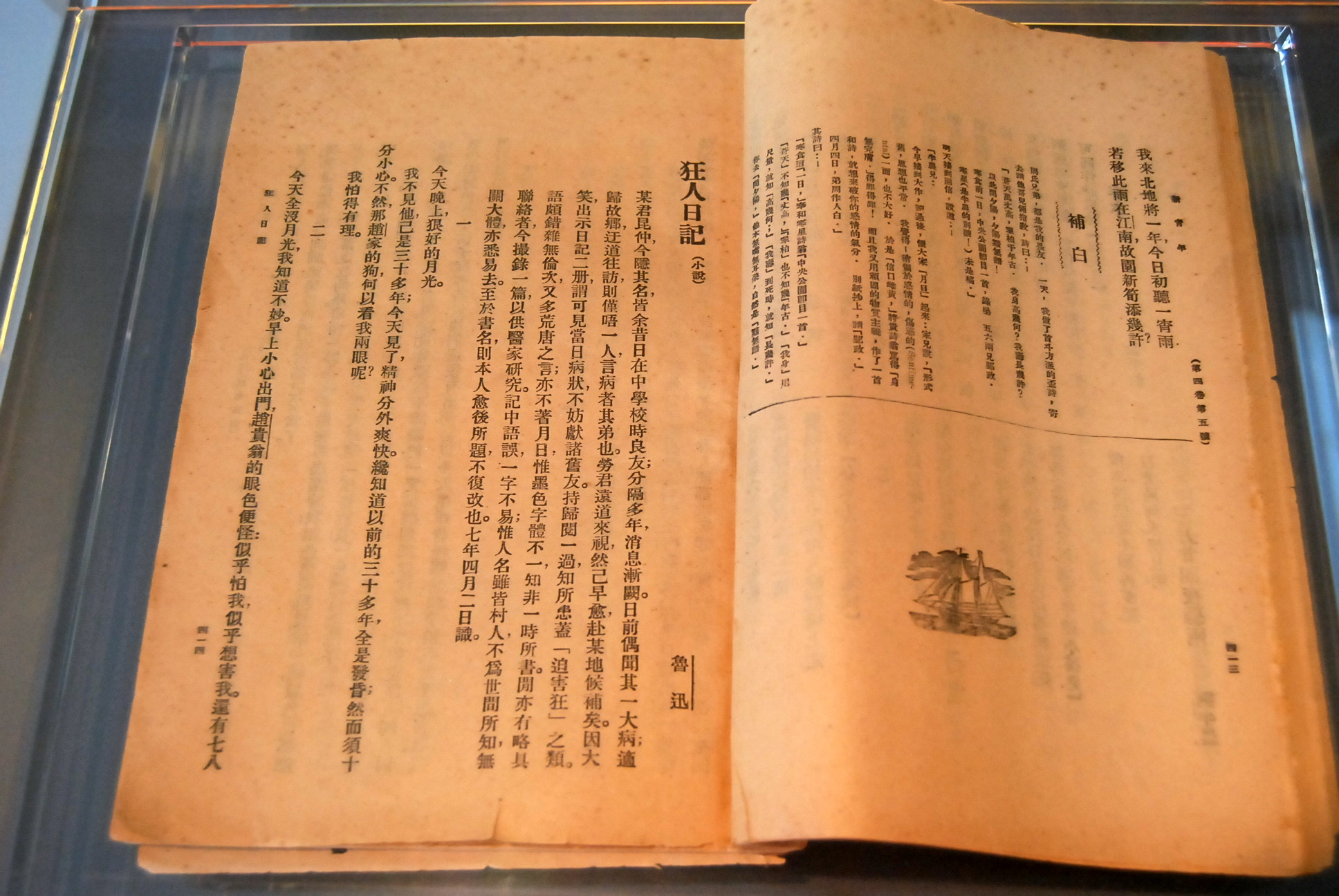
- A copy of "Diary of a Madman" in the Beijing Lu Xun Museum

Text available at Wikisource

Text available at Chinese Wikisource
- Original title: 狂人日記
- Country: Republic of China (1912–1949)
- Language: Chinese

Publication
- Publication date: April 1918

Diary of a Madman
- Traditional Chinese: 狂人日記
- Simplified Chinese: 狂人日记
- Literal meaning: "Madman's Diary"
Transcriptions
Standard Mandarin
- Hanyu Pinyin: Kuángrén Rìjì
- Gwoyeu Romatzyh: Kwangren Ryhjih
- Wade–Giles: K'uang^{2}-jen^{2} Jih^{4}-chi^{4}
- IPA: [kʰwǎŋ.ɻə̌n ɻɨ̂.tɕî]
Yue: Cantonese
- Yale Romanization: Kwòhng-yàhn Yat-geih
- Jyutping: Kwong^{4}-jan^{4} Jat^{3}-gei^{6}
- IPA: [kʷʰɔŋ˩.jɐn˩ jɐt̚˧.kej˨]
Southern Min
- Tâi-lô: Kông-lâng Ji̍t-kì

"Diary of a Madman", also translated as "A Madman's Diary" (Chinese: 狂人日記; pinyin: Kuángrén Rìjì) is a short story by the Chinese writer Lu Xun, published in 1918. It was an early work written in vernacular Chinese in Republican-era China and became associated with the New Culture Movement. Lu Xun's stories often critiqued early 20th-century Chinese society, and "Diary of a Madman" established a new language and revolutionary figure of Chinese literature, an attempt to challenge conventional thinking and traditional understanding.

The diary form and the idea of the madman who sees reality more clearly than those around him were inspired by Nikolai Gogol's short story "Diary of a Madman". Lu Xun's "madman" sees "cannibalism" both in his family and the village around him, and he then finds cannibalism in the Confucian classics which had long been credited with a humanistic concern for the mutual obligations of society, and thus used to justify the superiority of Confucian civilization. The story can be read as a sardonic attack on traditional Chinese culture and society and a call for a new cultural direction.

"Diary of a Madman" is the opening story in Lu Xun's first collection, and has often been referred to as "China's first modern short story". Along with Chen Hengzhe's "One Day", it was among the most influential modern vernacular Chinese works published after the Xinhai Revolution. It was selected as one of the 100 best books in history by the Bokklubben World Library, and listed as one of the ten best Asian novels of all time by The Telegraph in 2014.

== Synopsis ==
The story begins with a note from the narrator written in Classical Chinese, describing his reunion with an old friend. Having heard that the friend's brother was ill, he visits them, but discovers that the brother has recovered and taken up an official post. The rest of the story consists of 13 fragments the narrator has copied from a diary the brother kept while "mad", written in vernacular Chinese.

The diary reveals that he suffered a "persecution complex", and became suspicious of everyone's actions, including people's stares, a doctor's treatment, his brother's behavior, and even dogs barking. He came to believe that the people in his village had a grudge against him and were cannibals who carried the intent of consuming him. Reading a history book, the "madman" saw the words "eat people" written between the lines, as commentary placed in classical Chinese texts. As his "madness" progressed, he experiences psychosis thinking the villagers are attempting to force him into suicide, that his brother ate his sister and that he might have done so as well. He attempts to persuade the villagers to "change from the heart", but concludes that people have been eating each other for millennia. The last chapter concludes with a plea to "save the children".

== Literary devices ==
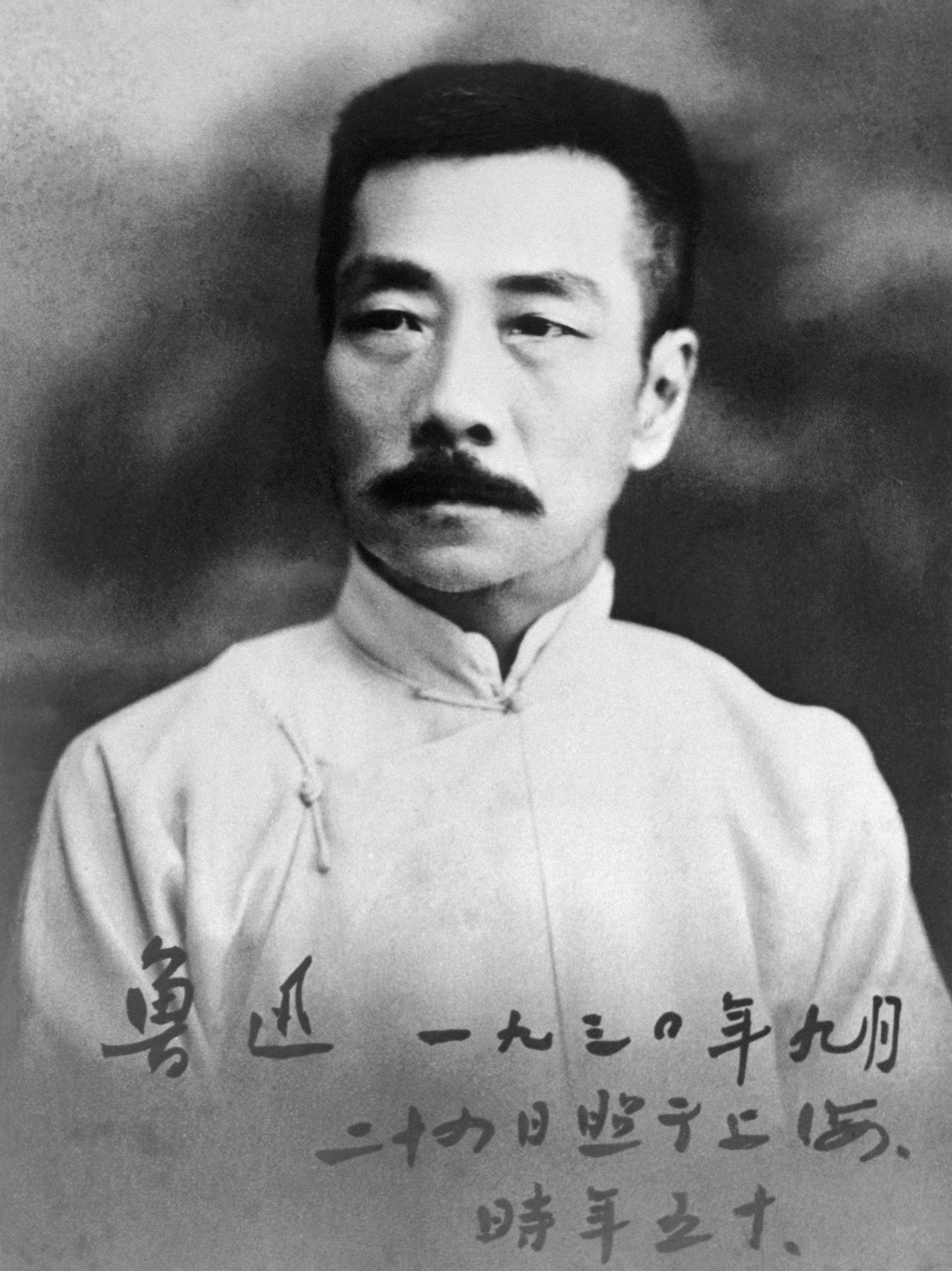
Image of Lu Xun, author of "Diary of a Madman"

Lu Xun's use of imagery, symbolism and metaphor serves as symbolic interpretation for his contempt for Chinese traditional values and thought. The "Diary of a Madman" can therefore be interpreted as a revolutionary call to action to reform the traditional belief system of Chinese society and bring Chinese values more in line with modern contemporary ones. The story is not just a depiction of a man suffering from mental illness with the delusion of being eaten but rather a symbol of the cannibalistic nature of Chinese customs and society wrapped up in the veneer of Confucianism. The story progresses with the appearance of imagery such as that of a dog, which symbolises cannibalism and a certain "slave mentality".

The metaphor of "eating people" symbolises the oppressive and feudalistic social structure and values entrenched within Chinese culture. The madman represents the "awakened" individual who re-gains his individuality and refuses to abide by the traditional and harmful cultural norms of society, with the neighbours whom he believes to want to devour him representing Chinese society in general. The story also emphasises how the madman is imprisoned both in his home and trapped psychologically in his mind, symbolising Chinese society's inability to escape its backward traditional and feudalistic roots.

Because China was built upon and continued to be informed by Confucian morality and principles over long stretches of history, concepts such as democracy, individualism, natural rights and freedom of thought did not exist and therefore faced difficulties taking root within the Chinese psyche. Lu Xun remarked that "[we] Chinese have always been a bit arrogant—unfortunately it is never 'individual arrogance' but without exception 'collective and patriotic arrogance'." Such arrogance appears in "Diary of a Madman" when the madman states, "Wanting to eat men, at the same time afraid of being eaten themselves, they all eye each other with the deepest suspicion..." a metaphor for the corruption of the Chinese people through the shackles of tradition, forming a fragmented and low-trust society incapable of working together for a better collective future. Another chilling example is the use of "medical science" to legitimise and perpetuate the existing oppressive feudal systems instead of curing diseases of the mind and body. As the prologue suggests, the lunatic/revolutionary is "cured" of his "persecution complex" and eventually assimilated back into the cannibalistic and sub-human culture he once denounced.

== Historical context ==
The early 20th century marked a tumultuous time in Chinese history, marked by the fall of the Qing Dynasty as a result of the 1911 revolution and the start of the republican era China. During this time, both immense outcries against western imperialism as well as calls for greater democracy, adoption of western ideas and modernisation were rife among the general populace. Warlordism, regionalism and civil unrest dominated China. Political instability dominated the young yet fractured republic nominally led by Sun-Yat Sen and considerable debate existed about future political direction which the country should take. The massive ensuing social changes remarkably shifted the development of Chinese literature and formed the development of a linguistic system known as baihua.

As a prominent intellectual and an important member of the May Fourth Movement, Lu is referred to as "the Father of Modern Chinese Literature", Lu Xun's contribution to Chinese literature exhibited a radical change in Chinese language and style. Through his works, Lu demonstrated his pursuit of the objective of cultural change and the promotion of modern literature. During the New Culture movement, the orthodox system of writing was replaced by the use of vernaculars. Through the adoption of a new literary writing style Lu Xun essentially founded modern Chinese literature. His anti-traditionalism and calls to break the hold of traditional Confucianism in Chinese society are reflected through his narratives. His most instrumental work, "Diary of a Madman", reflects contemporary issues and social structure revolving around the society of republican era China after the collapse of the Qing dynasty. At this time, Confucian values still influenced Chinese culture strongly with rules and social hierarchy being held as superior to the rights of the individual.

== Establishment of baihua ==
When the New Culture Movement (from which the May Fourth Movement sprang) emerged, many intellectuals argued that China needed to transform into a modern country. Intellectuals and writers declared a literary revolution to refashion the traditional system of writing. Officials who promoted baihua argued that "education for the whole population was necessary to establish democracy and science in China, and education required widespread literacy" (Chen, 1999). Hu Shih, an important figure in the May Fourth Movement and a prolific writer in modern China, founded a movement known as "New Literature Movement" in 1917. The movement sought to build a reformed version of Chinese script replacing the classical Chinese so ordinary Chinese could more easily learn and understand it. Thus, a new writing system was established called baihua.

Baihua was a vernacular literary language that was popularly used in folk stories, plays and commonly used as an everyday spoken language. Some scholars appealed to replace the traditional wenyan, and use baihua as a standard of writing and communication among the general population. During the Reform Movement of 1898, some development towards the application of baihua was found in newspaper and magazines.

"Diary of a Madman" was a famous and exemplary work of literature composed in May Fourth-style, presented as the fragments of a diary written in the vernacular language by the diarist. Baihua become a standard kind of written Chinese in the 1940s.

=== Reception ===
Diary of a Madman is often regarded as the first modern work of Chinese fiction because of its vernacular language, short story form, and lack of the traditional narrative conventions. The academic consensus on this point is not complete however, as these elements were used six months earlier in a short story by Chen Hengzhe (although Chen published in a journal in the United States aimed at overseas Chinese students).

Despite their success and dominance in Chinese literature, Lu Xun's stories took five years before they were widely recognised as notable works of literature. Before he published the "Diary", Lu Xun was in a state of complete hopelessness and despair. Yet his state of mind had been unknown to readers during this time, except to the few individuals who were close to him. Thus "Diary of a Madman", with its use of foreign techniques, was not easily comprehensible to most audiences at the time. The theme of cannibalism, and notion of "eating oneself", sparked controversy and criticism among readers due to its ambiguity and interpretation as an extremely harsh criticism of general Chinese culture and traditional ideas. Lu Xun's attempts to cure the cultural malaise which exists in traditional Chinese society through his writings were not easily embraced. However, the "unprecedented" nature of the story and its salient themes and timely arrival captured the attention of many authors and commentators alike. Overall, Lu Xun's work serves as an account of historical change in republican era China and biting social criticism towards issues which still hold relevance in Chinese society today. Lu Xun's short stories were recognised as a significant work of modern classical Chinese literature, reflecting the themes of Chinese society's struggle to break free from a culture of tyrannical imperial power which had ruled the country for millennia, the problematic social structure of Chinese society and the political issues of the time.
