= Written vernacular Chinese =

Written Chinese reflecting spoken varieties

- Traditional Chinese: 白話文
- Simplified Chinese: 白话文
- Hanyu Pinyin: báihuàwén
- Literal meaning: plain speech writing
Transcriptions
Standard Mandarin
- Hanyu Pinyin: báihuàwén
- Bopomofo: ㄅㄞˊ ㄏㄨㄚˋ ㄨㄣˊ
- Wade–Giles: pai^{2}-hua^{4} wen^{2}
Wu
- Romanization: bah^{入} gho^{去} ven
Yue: Cantonese
- Yale Romanization: baahk wá màn
- Jyutping: baak6 waa2/6 man4
Southern Min
- Hokkien POJ: pe̍h-oē bûn

Written vernacular Chinese, also known as baihua, comprises forms of written Chinese based on the vernacular varieties of Chinese spoken throughout China. It is contrasted with the more concise Literary Chinese, which was the dominant style of official and scholarly writing in imperial China until the early 20th century. It is also called standard written Chinese or modern written Chinese.

Writing styles based on vernacular Mandarin Chinese were used in novels by Ming and Qing dynasty authors, and later refined by intellectuals associated with the May Fourth Movement. A standardized form corresponding to the grammar of spoken Standard Chinese eventually developed, and has become the modern standard of writing used by speakers of all varieties of Chinese throughout Mainland China, Taiwan, Malaysia and Singapore.

== Background ==
During the Zhou dynasty (1046–256 BC), Old Chinese was the spoken form of the language, which was reflected in the Classical Chinese used to write the Chinese classics. Spoken Chinese began to evolve faster than the written form, which continued to emulate the language of the classics. The differences grew over time: by the Tang and Song dynasties (618–1279), people began to write in their vernacular dialects in the form of bianwen and yulu (語錄; 'language record'), and the spoken language was completely distinct from the formal Literary Chinese. Familiarity with Literary Chinese was fundamental to higher education. During the Ming and Qing dynasties (1368–1912), vernacular language began to be used in novels, but most formal writing was in Literary Chinese, save a few baihua newspapers during the late Qing.

In the 20th century, political activists began attempting to replace formal Literary Chinese with a written vernacular based on the Beijing dialect of Mandarin. Possible reforms included replacing characters with a phonetic writing system, character simplification, and expanding the vernacular lexicon with technical terminology for use in formal contexts. These activists wanted to create a literary context more accessible to the general public, and ultimately increase literacy in the country.

Written vernacular Chinese was also popularized by the Western missionaries entering China during the 19th century. Missionaries wrote stories, poems, essays and other works in vernacular to better spread their message. This early form of baihuawen was mainly written according to local vernaculars, rather than based on a specific dialect. Missionaries retained some of the style of the original texts, while adapting them to a Chinese audience.

Lower Yangtze Mandarin formed the standard for written vernacular Chinese, until it was displaced by the Beijing dialect during the late Qing. Baihua (白话; 'plain speech') was used by writers across China regardless of their local spoken dialect. Writers used Lower Yangtze and Beijing grammar and vocabulary in order to make their writing understandable to the majority of readers. While more difficult to master for writers who spoke other dialects, this standard written vernacular had the effect of standardizing written Chinese across the country, which had previously been the role of Literary Chinese. Following the May Fourth Movement, baihuawen became the normal written form of Chinese. While the phonology of modern Standard Chinese is based on the Beijing dialect of Mandarin, its grammar is officially based on exemplary works of vernacular literature, which excludes certain colloquial forms while incorporating some constructions from Literary Chinese. Similarly, written vernacular Chinese excludes slang from the Beijing dialect while absorbing some Literary vocabulary, as well as foreign loanwords and a small number of regionalisms from other major dialect groups.

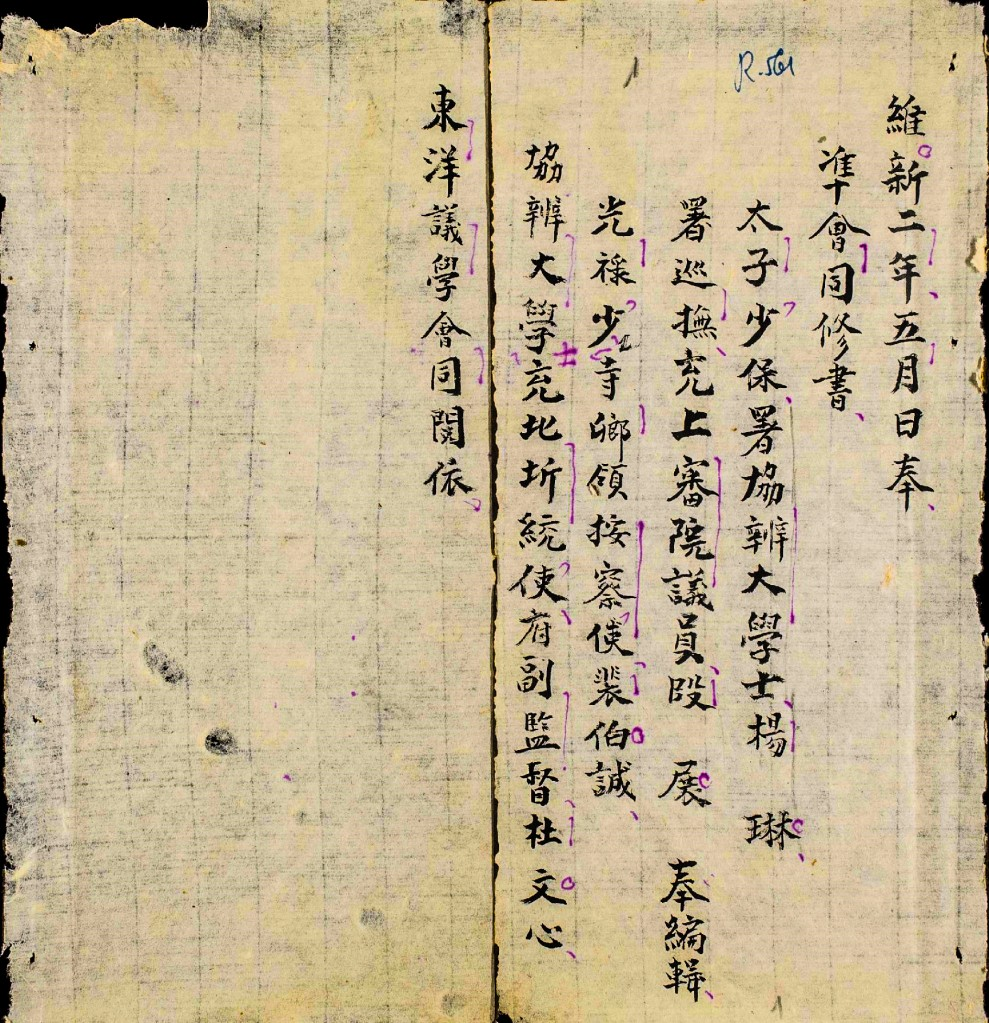
20th-century Literary Chinese writing

=== 20th century reforms ===
The period following the overthrow of the Qing dynasty and the establishment of the Republic of China was characterized by efforts at language reform. Many of the first language reformers of this period were associated with the New Culture Movement, which began around 1916 due to anti-imperialist and anti-traditionalist sentiments which boiled over during the May Fourth Movement, and which also promoted concepts like republicanism and democracy.

These sentiments inspired a movement to democratize language and replace classical Chinese with a written vernacular. Some of the most important proponents of vernacularization were Mao Zedong and renowned writer Lu Xun. This was at first before the establishment of the Chinese Communist Party, which occurred in 1921, though some of the most radical language reform activists were communists.

There was significant debate among reformers on what steps to language reform should be taken, and how far reform should go. The central component was vernacularization, but questions such as the extent to which the written vernacular should borrow elements from classical Chinese and whether Chinese characters should be replaced by an alphabet or another kind of writing system were hotly debated. Mao, Lu, and the more radical activists at first argued for replacing characters with a phonetic writing system, which they believed would more easily facilitate a switch from classical Chinese to vernacular language in writing. However, as it became increasingly clear that the Communists were winning the Chinese Civil War and would have control over mainland China, a change occurred in thinking at the top of the Chinese Communist Party. The official goal became to first simplify characters, then to possibly transition to a romanized phonetic writing system over time. The precise history of why and how this happens remains obscure, and the extent of the role that Chairman Mao Zedong played in the change of policy is not known. However, it has been suggested that Communist leadership wanted to preserve the cultural heritage of Chinese characters, while also encouraging increased literacy among the Chinese people. It has even been suggested that Mao acted to preserve characters at the encouragement of Joseph Stalin, so that China would maintain a domestic writing system and the linguistic heritage attached to it. An eventual switch from Chinese characters to pinyin, a domestically perfected romanized phonetic writing system, was indefinitely postponed to the point that it remains a complementary system to simplified characters, which is the dominant writing system in contemporary mainland China.

== Literature ==
The early modern period saw the first significant development of baihua novels. Jin Shengtan, who edited several vernacular novels in the 17th century, is widely regarded as a pioneer of vernacular Chinese literature. His vernacular edition of the classic novel Water Margin greatly raised the status of vernacular novels. During the late Qing, activists like Liang Qichao argued for the simplicity of baihua and its utility for increasing literacy rates. However, it was not until after the onset of the May Fourth Movement in 1919 and the promotion of vernacular writing by public intellectuals—such as reformer Hu Shih, writers Chen Hengzhe, Lu Xun, and Qian Xuantong, and the revolutionary Chen Duxiu—that vernacular Chinese gained widespread importance. In particular, Lu Xun's The True Story of Ah Q is generally accepted as the first modern work to fully utilize vernacular language.

During this period, baihua literature is also considered to be ideologically progressive. On one hand, reformers aggressively debated over the use of loanwords and the ideology of literature and public acceptance of new genres, while the consensus became clear that the imposition of Literary Chinese was a hindrance to education and literacy, and ultimately social progress within China. The work of Lu Xun and others did much to advance this view. Vernacular Chinese soon came to be viewed as mainstream by most people. Along with the growing popularity of vernacular writing in books in this period was the acceptance of punctuation, modelled after what was used in Western languages (traditional Chinese literature used almost no punctuation), and the use of Arabic numerals. Following the 1911 Revolution, successive governments continuously carried out a progressive and national education system to include primary and secondary education. All the curricula were in vernacular Chinese. Prolific writers such as Lu Xun and Bing Xin published popular works and appeared in literary journals of the day, which also published essays and reviews providing a theoretical background for the vernacular writing, such as Lu's "Diary of a Madman", which provoked a spirited debate in contemporary journals. Systematic education, talented authors and an active scholastic community closely affiliated with the education system all contributed to the establishment of the vernacular written language in a short amount of time.

Since the late 1920s, nearly all Chinese newspapers, books, and official and legal documents have been written in vernacular Standard Chinese. However, the tone or register and the choice of vocabulary may have been formal or informal, depending on the context. Generally, the more formal the register of vernacular Chinese, the greater the resemblance to Literary Chinese; modern writing lies on a continuum between the two. Since the transition, it has been extremely rare for a text to be written predominantly in Literary Chinese. Until the 1970s, the legal code of the Republic of China was written in Literary Chinese, though in a form replete with modern expressions and constructions that would have been foreign to ancient writers. Similarly, until the end of the 20th century, men of letters, especially in Taiwan, exchanged personal letters using literary stock phrases for openings, greetings, and closings, and using vernacular Chinese (albeit heavily influenced by the literary language) for the body. Nevertheless, only well-educated individuals in modern times have full reading comprehension of Literary texts, and very few are able to write proficiently in Literary Chinese. Presently, the ability to read some Literary Chinese is taught using familiar character forms: simplified throughout mainland China, and traditional in Taiwan, Hong Kong, and Macau. In the latter, Tang poetry is taught starting from elementary school and classical prose taught throughout lower and upper secondary schools.

Though it is rare to encounter fully Literary texts in modern times, it is just as rare to see texts of a considerable length only employ colloquial Chinese resources and exclude all Literary constructions and vocabulary. Despite initial intentions on the part of reformers to create a written language that closely mirrors the colloquial Mandarin dialects and to expunge classical influences from the language for the sake of modernization, it became clear to users of the new written standard that the admixture of a certain proportion of Literary grammatical constructions and vocabulary into baihuawen was unavoidable and serves as an important means of conveying tone and register. Thus, for the vernacular language used in official settings like academic and literary works or government communications (e.g. in academic papers, textbooks, political speeches, and legal codes), a small number of stock classical constructions and vocabulary items continue to be employed and are subject to additional related requirements relating to classical prosody and parallelism. The use of these structures is a characteristic of formal registers of baihuawen and distinguishes the formal modern language from conversational baihuawen on the one hand and fully Literary on the other hand. Though clearly dependent on context and on the personal preferences of the author, analyses of typical 20th-century essays and speeches have yielded a ratio of formal to informal expressions of around 2:3, or 40%. Even in informal personal communications otherwise composed entirely in the vernacular, classical words and usages may still appear every so often. In particular, chengyu are used by writers and speakers of all education levels in a variety of contexts.

== Variation ==
Multiple regional varieties of Chinese characters used in written vernacular Chinese exist:

- China uses simplified characters and a set of lexicon and grammar associated with Putonghua, regulated by the State Language Commission.
- Taiwanese Mandarin has important differences from Putonghua in terms of vocabulary. It is written in traditional characters and is regulated by the National Languages Committee.
- Hong Kong written Chinese differs from other forms of written Chinese in terms of vocabulary and grammar. It is written in Traditional characters. It is not standardized and is associated with a phonology derived from Cantonese.
- Singaporean Mandarin and Malaysian Mandarin are written using Simplified characters. They are regulated by Promote Mandarin Council and Chinese Language Standardization Council, respectively.

== Other Chinese varieties ==
There is also literature written in Cantonese, Shanghainese, and Taiwanese Hokkien, which uses additional characters to record the different vocabulary present in these varieties. Efforts to standardize their written forms include the Taiwanese Southern Min Recommended Characters. They are most commonly used in advertisements and court records of dialogue and colloquial expressions. They are often mixed with Literary and modern Standard vocabulary.

== See also ==
- Modern Chinese characters
- Chinese literature
- Chinese poetry
