= Qian Xuantong =

Chinese linguist and writer (1887–1939)

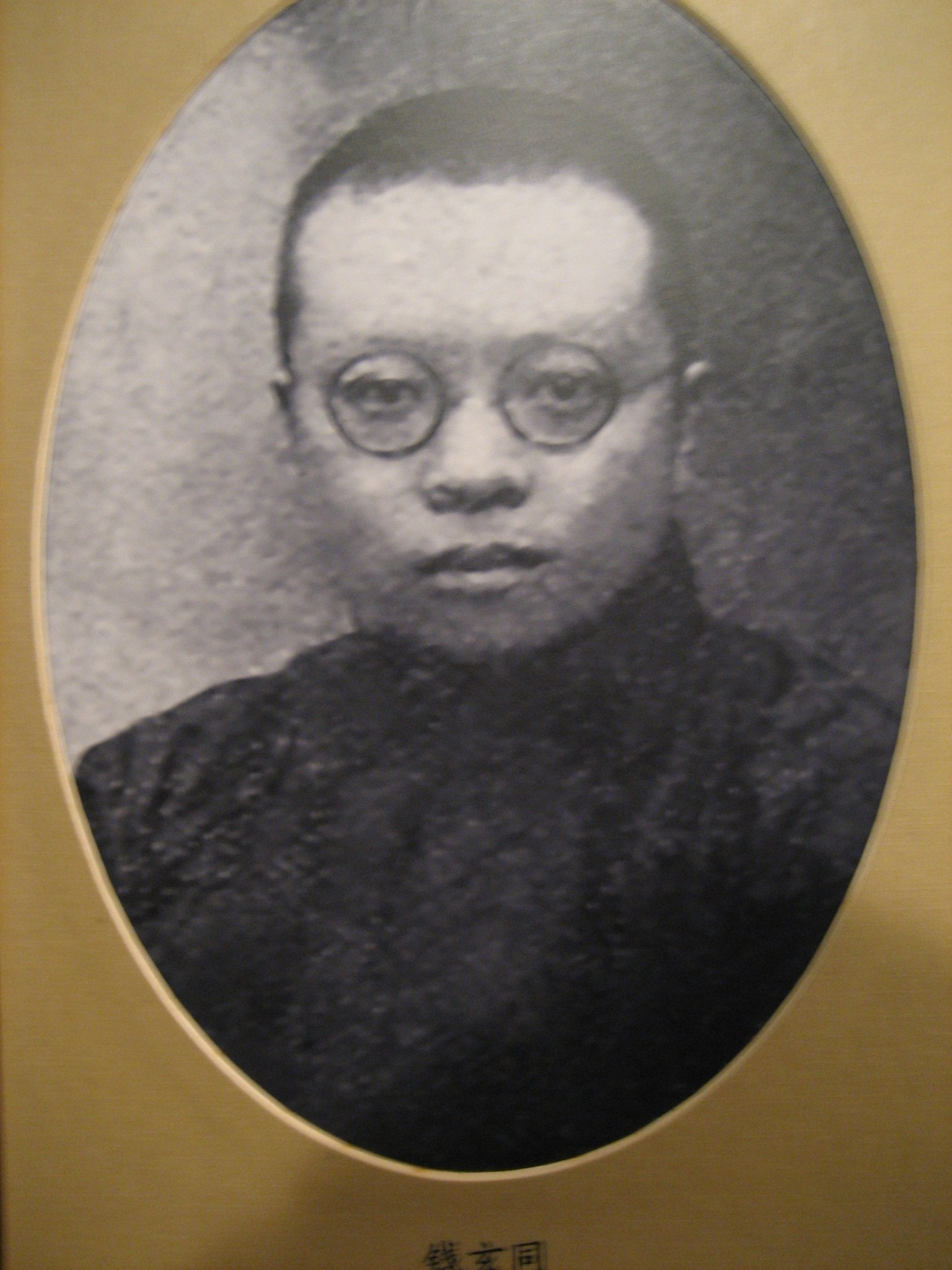
- Born: 1887; Huzhou, Zhejiang
- Died: 17 January 1939 (aged 51–52)
- Known for: Simplified characters, pinyin

Academic work
- Discipline: Linguist
- School or tradition: Doubting Antiquity School
- Institutions: Peking University
- Main interests: Philology, language planning

Chinese name
- Traditional Chinese: 錢玄同
- Simplified Chinese: 钱玄同
- Hanyu Pinyin: Qián Xuántóng
- Gwoyeu Romatzyh: Chyan Shyuantorng
- Wade–Giles: Ch’ien Hsüan-t’ung

Birth name
- Traditional Chinese: 錢夏
- Simplified Chinese: 钱夏
- Hanyu Pinyin: Qián Xià
- Gwoyeu Romatzyh: Chyan Shiah
- Wade–Giles: Ch'ien Hsia

Courtesy name
- Traditional Chinese: 德潛
- Simplified Chinese: 德潜
- Hanyu Pinyin: Déqián
- Gwoyeu Romatzyh: Derchyan
- Wade–Giles: Te-ch'ien

Qian Xuantong (钱玄同, 1887 – 17 January 1939) was a Chinese linguist and writer considered to be a leading figure of the Doubting Antiquity School, along with Gu Jiegang. He was a professor of literature at National Peking University.

== Biography ==
Born in Huzhou, Zhejiang, Qian was named Qian Xia at birth and was given the courtesy name Deqian. Qian trained in traditional Chinese philology. After receiving his university education in Japan, Qian held a number of teaching positions in mainland China. He was a student of Zhang Binglin; some of Zhang's works were copied and printed in Qian's seal script handwriting. As a philologist, Qian was the first to reconstruct the vowel system of Old Chinese in the IPA.

A close friend of Lu Xun, Qian was a key figure in the May Fourth Movement and the New Culture Movement. Despite his close relationship with the Chinese classics, he promoted the abolition of Literary Chinese. He was also a strong supporter of Esperanto, at one time even proposed the substitution of Chinese by it. An open letter Qian wrote in response to an anti-Confucian essay by Chen Duxiu stated:

Dear Mr. Chen, In an early essay of yours you strongly advocated the abolition of Confucianism. Concerning this proposal of yours I think that it is now the only way to save China. But upon reading it I have thought of one more thing: if you want to abolish Confucianism you must first abolish the Chinese [written] language. If you want to get rid of the average person's childish, uncivilized, obstinate way of thinking, then it is all the more essential that you first abolish the Chinese language. To abolish Confucianism and eliminate Taoism is a fundamental way to prevent the fall of China and to allow the Chinese to become a civilized nation in the twentieth century. But a more fundamental way than this is to abolish the written Chinese language, in which Confucian thoughts and fallacious Taoist sayings are recorded.

Chen thought that abolishing written Chinese would destroy the spoken language as well, and he countered Qian's proposal by suggesting that Chinese could use a Roman alphabet.

He and Liu Bannong promoted vernacular Chinese, attacking classical stylists such as Lin Shu. His skepticism of the Chinese heritage was such that he at one time wanted to change his surname to Yigu (疑古; 'suspecting things ancient'). He also did important work regarding standardization of simplified characters, as well as the Standard Chinese dialect and the design of pinyin.

His son Qian Sanqiang was a nuclear physicist who was instrumental in China's early nuclear weapons program, sometimes referred to as the "father of the atomic bomb" for China.

== In Culture ==
The Era of Awakening (觉醒年代) — 2021 Drama by CCTV 电视剧.
