= E-An Zen =

Chinese-American professor

- Born: 31 May 1928; Peking, China
- Died: 29 March 2014 (aged 85); Reston, United States
- Education: Cornell University, Harvard University
- Awards: Roebling Medal (1991)
- Scientific career
- Fields: Geology
- Workplaces: University of Maryland

Dr. E-An Zen (Chinese: 任以安; pinyin: Rén Yǐ'ān) was born in Peking, China, May 31, 1928, and came to the U.S. in 1946. He became a citizen in 1963 and from 1990 was an adjunct professor at the University of Maryland. He died on March 29, 2014, at the age of 85.

He contributed articles to professional journals and was a fellow of the Geological Society of America (Councillor, 1985–88, 1990–93; President, 1991–92); the American Association for the Advancement of Science (AAAS), the American Academy of Arts and Sciences, the Mineralogical Society of America (Council, 1974–77;Pres., 1975–76). He was a member of the Geological Society of Washington (Pres. 1973), the National Academy of Sciences, and the Mineralogical Association of Canada. Zen was active in programs to bring geological knowledge to the general public.

== Education ==
Received A.B from Cornell University in 1951, M.A from Harvard University in 1952, and PhD from Harvard University in 1955.

== Career ==
Research fellow at Woods Hole Oceanographic Institution, 1955–56; and a research associate, 1956–58. From 1958 to 1959 he was a visiting assistant professor at the University of North Carolina. Geologist with the U.S. Geological Survey from 1959 to 1980, and a Research geologist, 1980–89. Visiting associate professor at the California Institute of Technology, 1962; Crosby Visiting Professor, Massachusetts Institute of Technology, 1973; Harry Hess Senior Visiting Fellow, Princeton University, 1981; and Visiting Fellow, Australian National University, 1991.

Zen worked primarily in the northern Appalachians, especially on paleogeographic reconstructions and the origins of exotic terranes in New England. John McPhee once remarked that Zen was "approximately as exotic as the rock he studies."

== Awards ==
He received the Arthur L. Day Medal, Geological Society of America, 1986; Roebling Medal, Mineralogical Society of America, 1991; John Coke Medal, Geological Society of London, 1992; and the Distinguished Service Medal, U.S. Department of the Interior, 1979. He was also honored for outstanding contributions to public understanding of geology (American Geological Institute, 1994) and with the Thomas Jefferson Medal, Virginia Museum of Natural History, 1995.
