= The Story of Hair =

Short story by Lu Xun

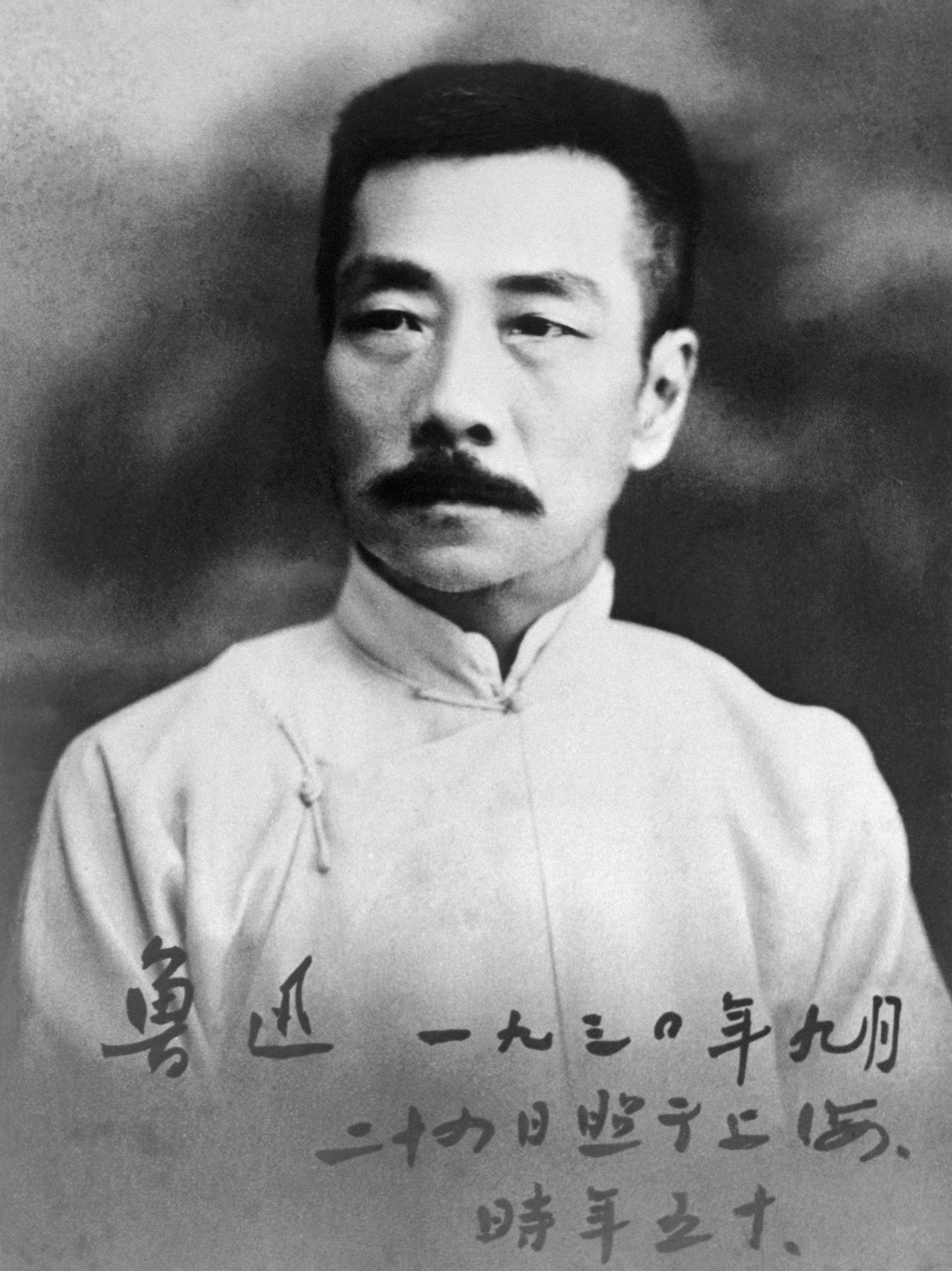
- Lu Xun
- Author: Lu Xun
- Original title: 頭髮的故事
- Language: Chinese
- Published: October 1920
- Original text: 頭髮的故事 at Chinese Wikisource
- Translation: The Story of Hair at Wikisource

The Story of Hair
- Traditional Chinese: 頭髮的故事
- Simplified Chinese: 头发的故事
- Literal meaning: "A story about hair"
Transcriptions
Standard Mandarin
- Hanyu Pinyin: Tóufà de gùshì

"The Story of Hair" (simplified Chinese: 头发的故事; traditional Chinese: 頭髮的故事; pinyin: Tóufà de gùshì) is a short story by Lu Xun, the founder of modern Chinese literature. Originally published in October 1920 in the Lamp of Learning supplement to the New Journal of Current Affairs (時事新報。學燈), it was later included in his first collection of short stories, Call to Arms (吶喊). It is based on Lu Xun's own experience of cutting off his queue and reflects his negative opinion of the Chinese national character.

== Background ==
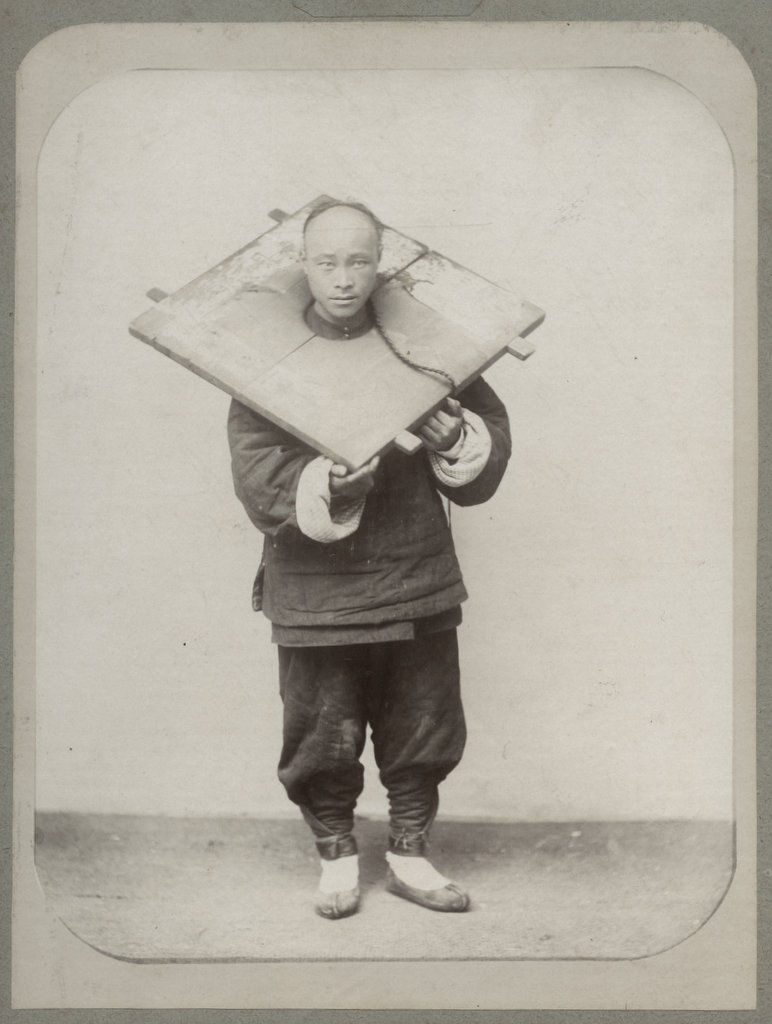
A Chinese criminal with the queue hairstyle, also wearing a cangue around his neck as punishment

In 1644, after the conquest of China by the Manchurian Qing dynasty, Han Chinese males were forced as a symbol of subservience to adopt the queue, a Manchurian hairstyle consisting of shaving the forehead and wearing the rest of one's hair in a long plait. In 1903, while a student in Japan, Lu Xun cut off his queue, adopted the Japanese Western-style student uniform and grew a moustache. When he returned to Shaoxing in August, his family were scandalised. Lu Xun bought a false queue and wore traditional clothing in the streets, but people noticed the queue was not real and he was jeered at. Lu Xun then did not use the queue and wore Western clothing, attracting even more attention and being called a "fake foreign devil". For the rest of his stay, Lu Xun remained at home. Later, Lu Xun became a school teacher, and attracted derision from the students when he did not urge them to abandon the queue. In his later story "Storm in a Teacup", a boatman arrives in a Republican village and finds his queue chopped off by revolutionaries, which causes him anxiety when he hears of the abortive Manchu Restoration.

== Synopsis ==
The narrator, who lives in Beijing, notices that October 10 - Double Ten Day (the National Day of the Republic of China, commemorating the fall of the Qing dynasty)- is not marked on his calendar. (The story was commissioned for a special October 10 issue of the Lamp of Learning.) Mr N (先生N), an older acquaintance based on Lu Xun's superior Xia Huiqing at the Ministry of Education, angrily dismisses the importance of the day, which he says is only remembered because the police remind people to put up the flag. Changing tone, he reminisces sadly about his friends who died during the anti-Qing struggle. N then describes his own experience of cutting of his queue, which mirrors that of Lu Xun. N reflects on the subservient position of China, mentioning that he once read an interview with a Japanese traveller who said that he had no need to speak Chinese or Malay when in those countries because he could make himself understood by beating the natives with his cane. He concludes the story by posing a question to idealists like the narrator, quoting the Russian writer Mikhail Artzybashev (who was popular in China at the time): "You promise a golden age to these people's sons and grandsons, but what do you have to offer them here and now?"
