= Selected Stories of Lu Hsun =

1960 English translation of stories by Lu Xun

Selected Stories of Lu Hsun is a collection of English translations of major stories of the Chinese author Lu Xun translated by Yang Hsien-yi and Gladys Yang and first published in 1960 by the Foreign Languages Press in Beijing. This book was republished in 2007 by the Foreign Languages Press with the updated title of Lu Xun Selected Works. Stories included in the collection are drawn from three of Lu Xun's story collections: 《吶喊》Call to Arms (CTA), 《彷徨》 "Wandering" (W), and 《故事新編》 "Old Tales Retold" (OTR).

== Major themes ==
One major theme in the stories in this collection is that habits of mind (psychology or "spirit") need to be examined; improvements in material conditions and institutions, while important, are not sufficient by themselves to renew China. See in particular A Madman's Diary and The True Story of Ah Q.

Lu Xun employed point of view in his stories in a way that was novel at the time for Chinese literature, helping readers consider new possibilities about the true nature of the reality around them.

A second major theme in the stories is the problem of how members of the intellectual class are to live their lives. It is a theme in many stories, including Kong Yiji, My Old Home, In the Wine Shop, Regret for the Past, and others.

A third major theme in the stories is commentary on traditional customs and institutions. The stories look at the specific dysfunctions of particular customs and institutions, and also at the general result in which people are discarded. It is a theme in many stories, especially Kong Yiji and The New Year Sacrifice.

== Story synopses ==
=== Preface to Call to Arms ===
In the preface, signed on December 3, 1922, Lu Xun describes the evolution of his social concerns. An important thread to this preface is his encounters with traditional Chinese medicine and the problems of health care, which bears directly on several stories in the collection. Lu Xun also describes one of his overarching objectives as a writer and social critic: he sees society as "an iron house without windows, absolutely indestructible, with many people fast asleep inside who will soon die of suffocation." Is it possible to help them? Or will he only make them suffer unnecessarily by intervening?

=== A Madman's Diary ===
(狂人日記, (CTA), dated April 1918) This story ostensibly reveals the delusions of a man who has passed through a period of madness, and has now returned to sanity and participation in "normal" society.

A theme in the story is the nature of reality, and the difficulty of attaining a perspective from which to see reality clearly. "I begin to realize that during the past thirty-odd years I have been in the dark . . ."

A secondary theme is the self-destructiveness of traditional Chinese society, likening it to cannibalism. "I have only just realized that I have been living all these years in a place where for four thousand years they have been eating human flesh."

The story is said to have drawn inspiration from Nikolai Gogol's story "Diary of a Madman".

Moreover, it is believed that the writing of this story closely coincides with Lu Xun's personal transition from a focus on medicine to a focus on psychology and literature.

=== Kong Yiji ===
(孔乙己, (CTA), dated March 1919) This is the story of a local intellectual who falls afoul of his community.

A major theme in this story is the way in which traditional Chinese society's system of advancement for intellectuals left many discarded and useless. "[Kong] had studied the classics but had never passed the official examination. With no way of making a living, he grew poorer and poorer, until he was practically reduced to beggary."

A related theme is the physical cruelty of traditional Chinese "justice." In the story, Kong is given a beating that lasts "nearly all night, until his legs were broken," and afterward he is reduced to crawling from place to place.

=== Medicine ===
(藥, (CTA), dated April 1919) This story focuses on a sick boy and a traditional Chinese folk medicine practice.

Two major (and inter-related) themes in this story are superstition, and man's search for meaning in a confusing world.

Lu Xun acknowledged the negative impact of beliefs about traditional Chinese medicine on his own life. In Medicine, the characters are told, "A roll dipped in human blood . . . can cure any consumption!" though this promise proves false. Scholars have suggested that Lu Xun's family experience with traditional Chinese medicine was crucial in forming his psychology and personality.

Despite its earthy topic, the story has a carefully wrought structure.

Summary

Old Zhuan and his wife, the proprietors of a small tea shop, save their money to buy a folk medicine cure for their son, Young Zhuan, who is dying of tuberculosis. The story opens with Old Zhuan leaving their shop and going to the home of the person selling the cure, a "roll of steamed bread, from which crimson drops were dripping to the ground." The crimson drops, we soon learn, are blood from a young man, Xia Yu (夏瑜), who was recently executed apparently for revolutionary activities. Xia Yu's name, his surname the name of a season and his given name a character with the jade radical, is often seen as an allusion to the name of Qiu Jin (秋瑾), a friend of Lu Xun who was beheaded for revolutionary activity.

The cure does not work and the mother of Young Zhuan meets the mother of the executed revolutionary in the cemetery. Here they both behold a mysterious wreath on the revolutionary's grave, a wreath that Lu Xun, in his introduction to this collection (which he entitled A Call to Arms), describes as one of his "innuendoes" to "those fighters who are galloping on in loneliness, so that they do not lose heart."

=== Tomorrow ===
(明天, (CTA), dated June 1920) This story also concerns a sick child and traditional Chinese folk medicine.

It raises the question: what if the ability to change the course of events is largely illusory? Do we still go on? "Something which had never happened to her before, and which she had thought never could happen, had happened. . . . She was only a simple woman. What solution could she think of?"

=== An Incident ===
(一件小事, (CTA), dated July 1920) More a meditation than a story, in An Incident a man's rickshaw puller collides with a pedestrian, and the passenger must confront the question: when do other people begin to matter? When do his own concerns have to adjust to those around him? "The military and political affairs of those years I have forgotten as completely as the classics I read in my childhood. Yet this incident keeps coming back to me, often more vivid than in actual life, teaching me shame, urging me to reform, and giving me fresh courage and hope."

(For comparison, see the book Rickshaw Boy by the Chinese novelist Lao She, published nearly two decades later.)

=== Storm in a Teacup ===
(風波, (CTA), dated October 1920) In this story, the "storm" is a change in government (presumably the Imperial Restoration of 1917). The "teacup" is a village in which some residents are preparing to turn the tables on the revolutionaries from some years before, while others face a simple, practical concern: will certain people's lack of a queue be noticed (and be punished)? Or are they too far from the action to be noticed?

One theme of the story is the difficulty of meaningful political participation in such a widely dispersed polity as China. Another theme is the life and death impact politics is able to make on people, even down at the village level. "I don't think the emperor will ascend the throne. I passed Mr. Chao's wine shop today, and he was sitting there reading again, with his queue coiled on the top of his head. He wasn't wearing his long gown, either."

=== My Old Home ===
(故鄉, (CTA), dated January 1921) On a visit to his old hometown, a man finds that a "lamentably thick wall"... "an invisible high wall" has grown up between himself and his old acquaintances.

Themes in the story include: artificial divisions among people due to class differences, the persistence of memory, the way people as well as places constitute the sense of a place, the painfulness of disconnection from the past, and the dilemma of intellectuals who must turn their attention away from the past and face present reality.

A theme in the story is the Chinese concept of ancestral home.

=== The True Story of Ah Q ===
(阿Q正傳, (CTA), dated December 1921) The story involves an ordinary village dweller of few means, and describes the habits of mind that he employs in navigating the course of his days. (In particular, he finds pretexts to transform many failures and embarrassments into "victories" by self-consolation.)

A major theme of the story is the question of what constitutes a bigger challenge: material conditions themselves, or the psychological processes that obstruct us from engaging realistically with material conditions.

=== Village Opera ===
(社戲, (CTA), dated October 1922) Ostensibly a comparison of the experience of attending Chinese opera performances in the city vs. a village, the story evolves into an essay on how people interact with each other within the village context, including attitudes toward sharing.

=== The New Year Sacrifice ===
(祝福, (W), dated February 1924) The "New Year Sacrifice" refers to a sacred rite taking place during the sensitive New Year period . . . and indirectly to the old widow who is too impure to be allowed to help prepare it. She had (forcibly) been remarried after her first husband died, only to be widowed again a few years later.

The story explores many themes. One theme is the use of taboos, and whether they are consistent with progress. More broadly, the themes of women's rights and marriage practices (including arranged marriage) are explored. "This poor woman, abandoned by people in the dust as a tiresome and worn-out toy, once left her own imprint in the dust, and those who enjoy life must have wondered at her for wishing to prolong her existence; but now at least she has been swept clear by eternity. Whether spirits exist or not I do not know; but in the present world when a meaningless existence ends, so that someone whom others are tired of seeing is no longer seen, it is just as well, both for the individual concerned and for others."

Even more broadly, the story raises the question of what society should do to address the plight of those who are traumatized, severely depressed, or otherwise psychologically, emotionally, or spiritually broken. Finally, Lu Xun considers universal themes, showing how people's "religious" questions ("What happens when you die? Is there a hell?") are relevant, even to non-believers. He suggests that sticking with a "safe" response ("I am not sure") is not enough.

=== In the Wine Shop ===
(在酒楼上, (W), dated February 1924) In this story, the narrator meets an old friend who expresses frustration because the need to respect the feelings of others (especially his mother) force him to engage in "futile" exercises, and the need to support himself forces him to teach the outmoded Confucian canon. "Who cares about such futile affairs anyway? One only wants to muddle through them somehow. When I have muddled through New Year I shall go back to teaching the Confucian Classics as before."

The story relates closely to the changing attitudes toward the traditional canon in the course of China's New Culture Movement.

The story deals with the theme of modern Chinese intellectuals confronting day-to-day reality. "In future? I don't know. Just think: Has any single thing turned out as we hoped of all we planned in the past? I'm not sure of anything now, not even of what I will do tomorrow, nor even of the next minute . . . . "

=== A Happy Family ===
(幸福的家庭, (W), dated March 1924) This story draws humorously on contemporary magazine subjects (the "happy family," the "ideal husband") to reveal, inter alia, what a real happy family looks like . . . dealing with the quotidien: errands, the crying of children, family chatter . . . .

The principal character in the story is writing a magazine article about a "a happy family": "The family naturally consists of a husband and wife - the master and mistress - who married for love. Their marriage contract contains over forty terms going into great detail, so that they have extraordinary equality and absolute freedom. Moreover they have both had a higher education and belong to the cultured elite . . . . "

=== Soap ===
(肥皂, (W), dated March 1924) Lu Xun uses a simple bar of soap to reveal experiential context (e.g. a shopping expedition) and conjugal intimacy (as it mediates the man's relationship with his wife) and social policy (revealing male chauvinism toward a female beggar), and more.

Lu Xun raises the question of who has the real power to deal with and bring about change: the stumbling man or his subtle wife?

=== Divorce ===
(離婚, dated November 1925) A young woman holds out hope that her marital dispute will be resolved in her favor.

Lu Xun suggests that "getting a hearing" is like a dream; the reality is that the powers-that-be settle things in the usual manner. "Seventh Master moved his lips, but nobody could hear what he was saying. Only his servant heard, and the force of this order entered his very marrows, for twice he twitched as if overcome by awe. . . . [She] knew that something unexpected and completely unforeseen was about to happen - something which she was powerless to prevent. Only now did she realize the full power of Seventh Master."

=== The Misanthrope ===
(孤獨者, dated October 1925) The story's protagonist is a "misanthrope" because he rejects the bond of people to each other ("it is hard to live so that no one will mourn for your death") and because he experiences emotion in situations differently than conventional society expects.

A major theme of the story is the desire to live and think according to one's own convictions, vs. doing society's bidding. Lu Xun raises the question of whether anyone who tries to go his own way will end up as a "wounded wolf."

=== Regret for the Past ===
(傷逝, dated October 1925) The "true story" of what really happens when modern romance (a "love match") is pursued.

A major theme of the story is that "honesty" and "truth" (with or without rejection of outmoded traditional marital norms) are not enough to bring about a successful marital relationship.

=== The Flight to the Moon ===
(奔月, (OTR), dated December 1926) In this story based on traditional myths and themes, Lu Xun shows that the heroic figure (the intellectual?) and his quest (social crusade?) can sometimes be depressingly mundane.

A theme is the idea that humor and imagination are just as important as high purpose in helping people to persevere. Lu Xun likely also wrote this story as retaliation against Lu Xun's formal pupil Kao Chang-hung who attacked Lu Xun in articles. The story of Feng Meng shooting Hou Yi in "The Flight to the Moon" suggests Kao's attack on Lu Xun.

=== Forging the Swords ===
(鑄劍 (OTR), dated October 1926) In another story based on traditional myths and themes, Lu Xun weighs the cost of seeking justice (and, by extension, of wielding the sword of truth), and suggests that great sacrifices are most certainly required in this particular pursuit.
