= Fengbo =

Fengbo may refer to:

- Fengbo (deity), Taoist deity of the wind
- A Storm in a Teacup (short story) (風波; Fēngbō), 1920 short story by Lu Xun
- Fengbo station of the Beijing Subway
