= Shi Lu =

Chinese painter and poet (1919–1982)

Shi Lu (simplified Chinese: 石鲁; traditional Chinese: 石魯; pinyin: Shí Lǔ; December 13, 1919– August 25, 1982), born Feng Yaheng (simplified Chinese: 冯亚珩; traditional Chinese: 馮亞珩; pinyin: Féng Yàhéng), was a Chinese painter, wood block printer, poet and calligrapher. He based his pseudonym on two artists who greatly influenced him, the landscape painter Shitao and writer Lu Xun. He is the father of Chinese traditional painting artist Shi Guo.

== Life and art ==
Shi Lu came from a wealthy land owning family in Renshou County, Sichuan Province. A student of the Chinese traditional painting style guohua, he studied at Dongfang Art College and West China Union University in Chengdu (1934-1940). He joined the Chinese Communist Party and in 1949 at the first national assembly was elected and executive member of the China Artists Association.

In 1955, Shi Lu travelled to India to supervise the overall art design of a Chinese pavilion at an international expo. In 1956, he attended the Asian-African National Art Exhibition in Egypt. During these travels, he made many sketches of the people he observed developing his technique of Western drawing and Chinese brushwork.

In 1959, he was commissioned to produce a large scale painting to be displayed in the Great Hall of the People in Beijing to commemorate the 10th anniversary of the forming of the People's Republic of China.

== Sources ==
- Hawkins, Shelley Drake (2010), "Summoning Confucius: Inside Shi Lu's Imagination", in King, Richard; Zheng, Sheng Tian; Watson, Scott (eds.), Art in Turmoil: The Chinese Cultural Revolution, 1966-76, Hong Kong: Hong Kong University Press, pp. 58–90, ISBN 9789888028641
- Jia, Jia (2005). "The Reconstruction of a Political Icon: Shi Lu's Painting Fighting in Northern Shaanxi". Qualitative Inquiry. 11 (4): 535–548. doi:10.1177/1077800405276766. S2CID 145478176.
- Andrews, Julia Frances (1994). Painters and Politics in the People's Republic of China, 1949-1979. Berkeley: University of California Press. ISBN 0520079817.
