= Lu Xun =

Chinese novelist and essayist (1881–1936)

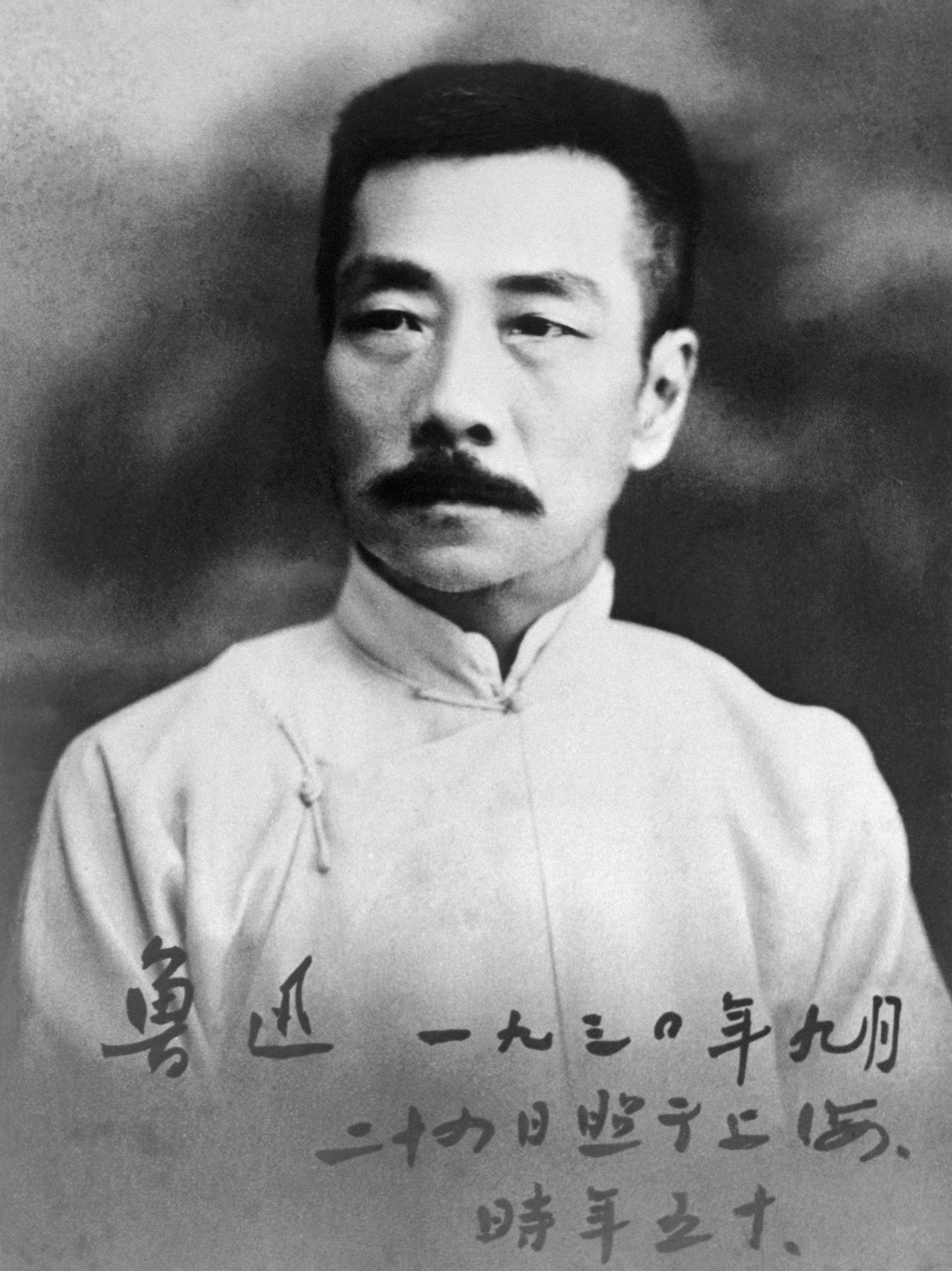
- Lu in 1930
- Born: Zhou Zhangshou; 25 September 1881; Shaoxing, Zhejiang, Qing China
- Died: 19 October 1936 (aged 55); Shanghai, China
- Resting place: Tomb of Lu Xun, Shanghai
- Education: Jiangnan Naval Academy; School of Mines and Railways; Sendai Medical Academy at Tohoku University
- Occupations: Writer; literary critic; lecturer; civil servant
- Employers: Ministry of Education; Peking University; Beijing Normal University; Beijing Women's College; Xiamen University; Sun Yat-sen University
- Spouse: Zhu An
- Partner: Xu Guangping (1927–1936)
- Children: 1
- Relatives: brothers: Zhou Zuoren, Zhou Jianren
- Writing career
- Years active: 1902–1936
- Genres: Short story; sketch; novella; poetry; prose poetry; essay; literary criticism; history; autobiography
- Notable works: "Diary of a Madman" (1918); "Kong Yiji" (1919); The True Story of Ah Q (1921)
- Movements: New Culture Movement; May Fourth Movement; Social realism

Chinese name
- Traditional Chinese: 魯迅
- Simplified Chinese: 鲁迅
Transcriptions
Standard Mandarin
- Hanyu Pinyin: Lǔ Xùn
- Wade–Giles: Lu^{3} Hsün^{4}
- IPA: [lù ɕŷn]
Wu
- Romanization: Lu Sin
- Suzhounese: ^{1}Lou_{5} Sin^{5}
Yue: Cantonese
- Yale Romanization: Lóuh Seun
- Jyutping: Lou5 Seon3
- IPA: [lɔw˩˧ sɵn˧]
Southern Min
- Hokkien POJ: Ló͘ Sìn
- Tâi-lô: Lóo Sìn

Birth name
- Traditional Chinese: 周樹人
- Simplified Chinese: 周树人
Transcriptions
Standard Mandarin
- Hanyu Pinyin: Zhōu Shùrén
- Gwoyeu Romatzyh: Jou Shuhren
- Wade–Giles: Chou^{1} Shu^{4}-jen^{2}
Yue: Cantonese
- Yale Romanization: Jāu Syuh Yàhn
- Jyutping: Zau1 Syu6 Jan4

Lu Xun (Chinese: 魯迅; pinyin: Lǔ Xùn, [lù ɕŷn]; 25 September 1881 – 19 October 1936), pen name of Zhou Shuren, born Zhou Zhangshou, was a Chinese writer. A leading figure of modern Chinese literature, he wrote in both vernacular and literary Chinese as a novelist, literary critic, essayist, poet, translator and political commentator, known for his sharp, satirical style and critical reflections on Chinese history and culture.

Lu Xun was born into a declining family of landlords and scholar-officials in Shaoxing, Zhejiang, and was the elder brother of Zhou Zuoren. Although he initially aspired to sit for the imperial examination, his family's declining fortunes led him to attend government-funded schools established under the Self-Strengthening Movement, where he was introduced to Western science and thought. In 1904, he enrolled at the Sendai Medical College in Japan, but left medicine to pursue literature. Financial difficulties forced his return to China, where he taught at various schools and colleges before taking a position at the Ministry of Education of the Beiyang government.

Lu Xun pioneered the New Culture Movement by publishing the first novel in vernacular Chinese, Diary of a Madman, in 1918. He gained prominence through his political writings in La Jeunesse following the May Fourth Movement in 1919. From the late 1920s onward, Lu Xun became increasingly engaged with Marxist thought and leftist politics. In the 1930s, he maintained a close but fraught relationship with the League of Left-Wing Writers. His works have been canonized in the People's Republic of China owing to Mao Zedong's high regard for him.

== Biography ==
=== Family background ===
Lu Xun was born in Shaoxing, Zhejiang. His birth name was "Zhou Zhangshou" (Chinese: 周樟壽). His courtesy name was "Yushan" (豫山), which he later changed to "Yucai" (豫才). In 1898, before he went to the Jiangnan Naval Academy, he took the given name "Shuren" (樹人), which figuratively means "to be an educated man". The name "Lu Xun ", by which he is best known, was a pen name chosen upon the initial publishing of his story Diary of a Madman in 1918, with the surname Lu from his mother.

The Zhou family had been prosperous for centuries, and had become wealthy through landowning, pawnbroking, and by having several family members promoted to government positions. Lu Xun's paternal grandfather, Zhou Fuqing, was appointed to the Imperial Hanlin Academy in Beijing, the highest position possible for aspiring civil servants at that time. By the time Lu Xun was born, however, his family's prosperity had already been declining.

Lu Xun's father, Zhou Boyi, had been successful at passing the county-level imperial examinations, the route to wealth and social success in imperial China, but was unsuccessful in writing the more competitive provincial-level examinations. In 1893 he was discovered attempting to bribe an examination official. He was stripped of his position in the government and forbidden to ever again write the civil service examinations. Lu Xun's grandfather was also implicated, and was sentenced to beheading for his son's crime. The sentence was later commuted, and he was imprisoned in Hangzhou instead. The Zhou family only prevented Lu Xun's grandfather from being executed through regular, expensive bribes to authorities, until he was finally released in 1901.

After the family turmoil, Lu Xun's father engaged in heavy drinking and opium use and his health declined. Local doctors attempted to cure him through a series of expensive quack prescriptions, including monogamous crickets, sugar cane that had survived frost three times, ink, and the skin from a drum. He might have suffered from dropsy. He died of an asthma attack in 1896, at the age of 35.

Lu Xun's mother came from the same landed-gentry class as Lu Xun's father and was a native of Anqiaotou, a small rural town that is now part of Tongxiang, Zhejiang. Because formal education was not considered appropriate for girls, she received no schooling, but nevertheless taught herself to read and write.

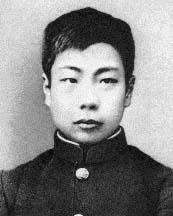
Lu Xun in his youth

=== Education ===
Lu Xun's early education was based on the Confucian classics, in which he studied poetry, history, and philosophy—subjects which, he later reflected, were neither useful nor interesting to him. Instead, he enjoyed folk stories and opera, including the mythological narratives of the Classic of Mountains and Seas and the ghost stories told to him by a servant.

Lu Xun half-heartedly participated in the first, district-level civil service examination in 1898, but then abandoned pursuing a traditional Confucian education or career. He intended to study at a prestigious school, the Qiushi Academy (or Seeking Affirmation Academy) in Hangzhou, but was forced by his family's poverty to instead study at the Jiangnan Naval Academy, a tuition-free military school in Nanjing.

As a consequence of Lu Xun's decision to attend a military school specializing in Western education, his mother wept, he was instructed to change his name to avoid disgracing his family, and some of his relatives began to look down on him. Lu Xun attended the Jiangnan Naval Academy for half a year, and left after it became clear that he would be assigned to work in an engine room, below deck, which he considered degrading. He later wrote that he was dissatisfied with the quality of teaching at the academy.

After leaving the school, Lu Xun sat for the lowest level of the civil service exams, and finished 137th of 500. He intended to sit for the next-highest level, but became upset when one of his younger brothers died, and abandoned his plans.

Lu Xun transferred to the School of Mines and Railways affiliated to the Jiangnan Naval Academy in 1899, and graduated in 1902. The school exposed Lu Xun to foreign literature, philosophy, history, and science, and he studied English and German intensively. Some of the influential authors that he read during that period include T. H. Huxley, John Stuart Mill, Yan Fu, and Liang Qichao. His later social philosophy may have been influenced by several novels about social conflict that he read during the period, including Ivanhoe and Uncle Tom's Cabin.

Lu Xun did well at the school with relatively little effort, and occasionally experienced racism directed at him from resident Manchu bannermen. The racism he experienced may have influenced his later sense of Han Chinese nationalism. After graduating Lu Xun planned to become a doctor.

In 1902, Lu Xun left for Japan on a Qing government scholarship to pursue an education in Western medicine. After arriving in Japan he attended the Kobun Institute, a preparatory language school for Chinese students attending Japanese universities. After encouragement from a classmate, he cut off his queue that Han Chinese were obliged to wear at the time, and practiced jujutsu in his free time. He had an ambiguous attitude towards Chinese revolutionary politics during the period, and it is not clear whether he joined any of the revolutionary parties that were popular among Chinese expatriates in Japan at that time, such as the Tongmenghui. He experienced anti-Chinese racism, but was simultaneously disgusted with the behaviour of some Chinese who were living in Japan. His earliest surviving essays, written in literary Chinese, were published while he was attending this school, and he translated into Chinese some of the novels, including Jules Verne's From the Earth to the Moon and Twenty Thousand Leagues Under the Seas.

In 1904, Lu Xun enrolled at the Sendai Medical School (now Tohoku University School of Medicine), but remained there for less than two years. He generally found his studies at the school tedious and difficult, partially due to his imperfect Japanese. While at medical school, he met Fujino Genkurō, initially his anatomy professor, who showed particular kindness toward Lu Xun, then the school’s only Chinese student. Because of Fujino’s mentorship, Lu Xun was accused by some classmates of receiving unfair assistance in examinations, including advance access to examination questions. Lu Xun later recalled his mentor affectionately in the essay “Mr. Fujino”, published in Dawn Blossoms Plucked at Dusk. The essay became one of his best read works and has been included in school textbooks in both China and Japan.

While Lu Xun was attending medical school, the Russo-Japanese War (1904–1905) broke out. Part of the war was fought on disputed Chinese land. Lantern slides used in the classroom also featured news items. One news slide showed a public execution of a Chinese prisoner being executed by the Japanese military for being an alleged Russian spy. The on-lookers shown in the slide were mainly Chinese, and Lu Xun was shocked by what he viewed as their complete apathy. In his preface to Nahan, the first collection of his short stories, Lu Xun explained how viewing this scene influenced him to quit studying medicine and become a literary physician to what he perceived as China's spiritual illness:

At the time, I hadn't seen any of my fellow Chinese in a long time, but one day some of them showed up in a slide. One, with his hands tied behind him, was in the middle of the picture; the others were gathered around him. Physically, they were as strong and healthy as anyone could ask, but their expressions revealed all too clearly that spiritually they were calloused and numb. According to the caption, the Chinese whose hands were bound had been spying on the Japanese military for the Russians. He was about to be decapitated as a 'public example.' The other Chinese gathered around him had come to enjoy the spectacle.

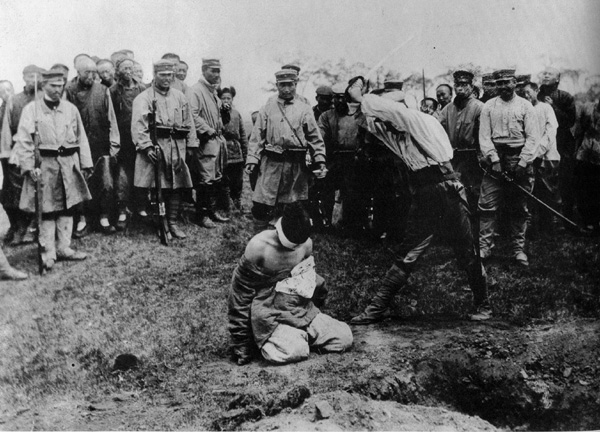
An execution scene, possibly viewed by Lu Xun in 1905

In March 1906, Lu Xun secretly terminated his pursuit of the degree and left college. After arriving in Tokyo, he made sure that the Chinese embassy would not cancel his scholarship and registered at the local German Institute, but was not required to take classes there. He began to read Nietzsche, and wrote a number of essays in the period that were influenced by his philosophy.

In June 1906, Lu Xun's mother heard a rumor that he had married a Japanese girl and had a child with her, and feigned illness as a pretext to ask Lu Xun to return home, where she would then force him to take part in an arranged marriage she had agreed to several years before. The girl, Zhu An, had little in common with Lu, was illiterate, and had been subject to foot binding. Lu Xun married her, but the two never developed a romantic relationship. Despite this, he continued to provide for her financially for the rest of his life. Several days after the wedding, Lu Xun sailed back to Japan with his younger brother, Zhou Zuoren, and left behind his new wife.

After returning to Japan he took informal classes in literature and history, published several essays in student-run journals, and in 1907 briefly took Russian lessons. He attempted to found a literary journal, New Life, with his brother, but before the first issue could be published, the project’s other contributors and financial backers withdrew, causing it to collapse. In 1909 Lu Xun and his brother published their translations of Western fiction, including Edgar Allan Poe, as Tales from Abroad, but the book sold only 41 copies of the 1,500 copies that were printed. The publication failed for a number of reasons: it was only sold in Tokyo, which did not have a large Chinese population, and in a single silk shop in Shanghai. Additionally, they wrote in literary Chinese, which was difficult for ordinary people to read.

Lu's 1908 essay On the Power of Mara Poetry was significant in introducing Byronic romanticism and romantic literature to Sinophone audiences.

=== Early career ===
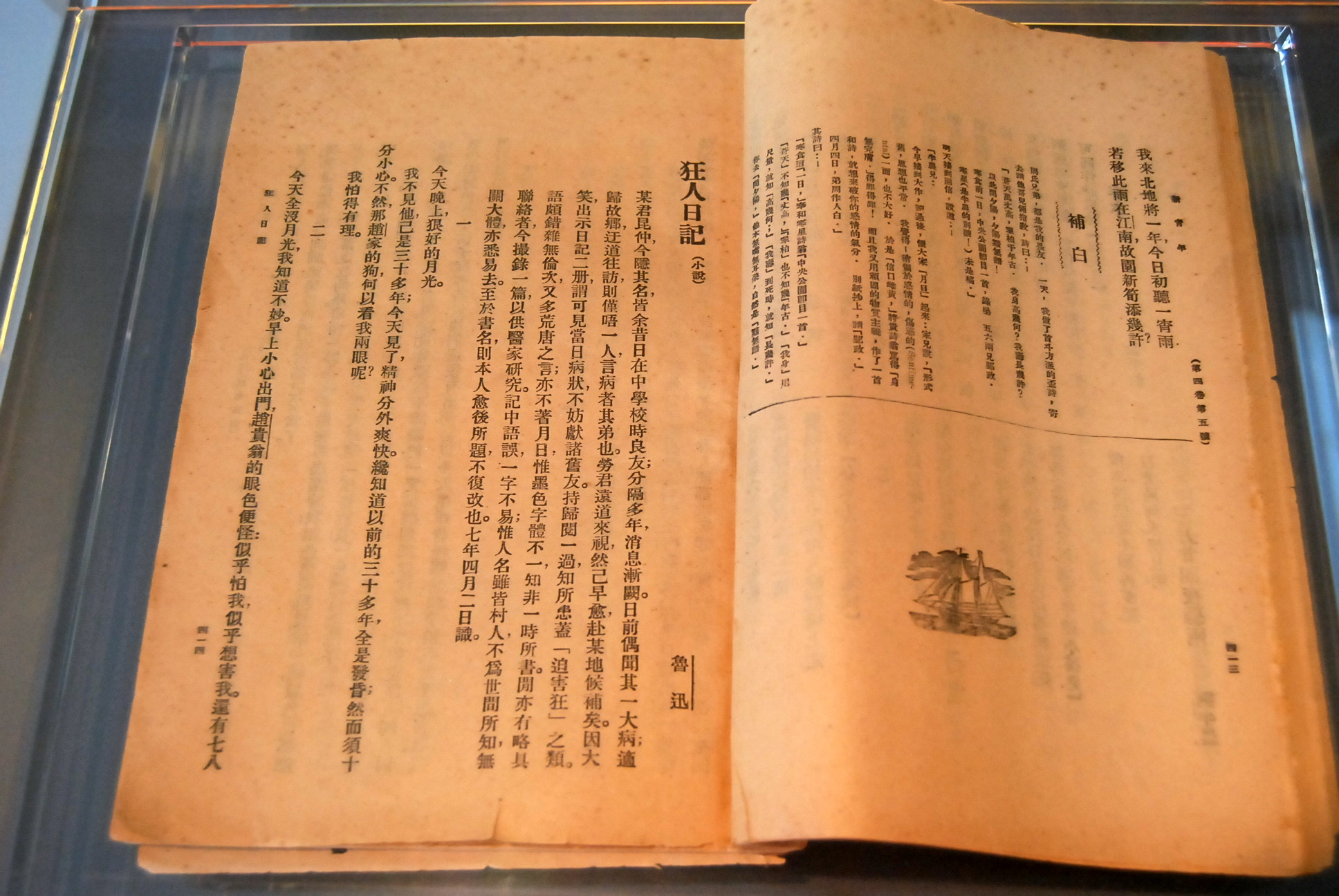
1918 printed edition of "Diary of a Madman", collection of the Beijing Lu Xun Museum

Lu Xun intended to study in Germany in 1909, but did not have sufficient funds, and was forced to return home. Between 1909 and 1911 he held a number of brief teaching positions at local colleges and secondary schools, partly to support his brother Zuoren's studies in Japan.

Lu Xun spent these years in traditional Chinese literary pursuits: collecting old books, researching classical Chinese novels, reconstructing ancient tombstone inscriptions, and compiling the history of his native Shaoxing. He explained to a friend that his activities were not "scholarship", but "a substitute for 'wine and women'". In his personal letters he expressed disappointment about his own failure, China's political situation, and his family's continuing impoverishment.

In 1911 he returned to Japan to retrieve his brother, Zuoren, so that Zuoren could help with the family finances. Zuoren wanted to remain in Japan to study French, but Lu Xun wrote that "French... does not fill stomachs". He encouraged another one of his brothers, Jianren, to become a botanist. He began to drink heavily, a habit he continued for the rest of his life. In 1911 he wrote his first short story, Nostalgia, but he was so disappointed with it that he threw it away. Zuoren saved it, and had it published two years later under his own name.

In February 1912, shortly after the Xinhai Revolution overthrew the Qing dynasty, Lu Xun gained a position at the Ministry of Education of the newly founded Republic of China. He worked in Nanjing before moving with the ministry to Beijing, where he lived from 1912 to 1926. Together with Qian Daosun and Xu Shoushang, he designed the Twelve Symbols national emblem in 1912.

Between 1912 and 1917 he was a member of an ineffectual censorship committee of the Beiyang government, informally studied Buddhist sutras, lectured on fine arts, wrote and self-published a book on the history of Shaoxing, and edited and self-published a collection of folk stories from the Tang and Song dynasties. He collected and self-published an authoritative book on the work of an ancient poet, Ji Kang, and wrote A Brief History of Chinese Fiction, a work which, because traditional scholars had not valued fiction, had little precedent in China. After Yuan Shikai declared himself the Emperor of China in 1915, Lu Xun was briefly forced to participate in rituals honoring Confucius, which he ridiculed in his diaries. During his tenure at the Beiyang government's Ministry of Education, he contributed to the renovation and expansion of the National Library of China in Beijing and helped establish the Natural History Museum and the Library of Popular Literature.

In 1917, Qian Xuantong invited Lu Xun to write for La Jeunesse, a radical populist literary magazine newly founded by Chen Duxiu. At first, Lu Xun was skeptical that his writing could serve any social purpose. He told Qian: "Imagine an iron house without windows, absolutely indestructible, with many people fast asleep inside who will soon die of suffocation. But you know since they will die in their sleep, they will not feel the pain of death. Now if you cry aloud to wake a few of the lighter sleepers, making those unfortunate few suffer the agony of irrevocable death, do you think you are doing them a good turn?" Qian replied, "But if a few awake, you can't say that there is no hope of destroying the iron house." Shortly afterwards, in 1918 Lu Xun wrote the first short story published under his name, Diary of a Madman, for the April 2, 1918 issue of the magazine. Lu Xun recounted the conversation in his short story collection, Call to Arms. It is widely known in China as a metaphor for the traditional Chinese values and norms that Lu Xun opposed.

Diary of a Madman was praised for its iconoclasm, its synthesis of Chinese and foreign conventions and ideas, and its skillful narration, and Lu Xun became recognized as one of the leading writers of the New Culture Movement. Lu Xun continued writing for the magazine, where he produced some of his most famous stories between 1917 and 1921. These stories were collected and re-published in Nahan ("Outcry") in 1923.

In 1919, Lu Xun moved his family from Shaoxing to a large compound in Beijing, where he lived with his mother, his two brothers, and their Japanese wives. This living arrangement lasted until 1923, when Lu Xun had a falling out with his brother, Zuoren, after which Lu Xun moved with his wife and mother to a separate house. Neither Lu Xun nor Zuoren ever publicly explained the reason for their disagreement, but Zuoren's wife later accused Lu Xun of making sexual advances towards her. Some writers have speculated that their relationship may have worsened as a result of issues related to money, that Lu Xun walked in on Zuoren's wife bathing, or that Lu Xun had an inappropriate "relationship" with Zuoren's wife in Japan that Zuoren later discovered. After the falling out with Zuoren, Lu Xun became depressed.

In 1920, Lu Xun began to lecture part-time at several colleges, including Peking University, Beijing Normal University, and Beijing Women's College, where he taught classical fiction and literary theory. His lecture notes were later collected and published as A Brief History of Chinese Fiction. He was able to work part-time because he only worked at the Education Ministry three days a week for three hours a day. In 1923 he lost his front teeth in a rickshaw accident, and in 1924 he developed the first symptoms of tuberculosis. In 1925 he founded a journal, Wilderness, and established the "Weiming Society" in order to support young writers and encourage the translation of foreign literature into Chinese.

In the 20 years after the Xinhai Revolution, there was a flowering of literary activity with dozens of journals. The goal was to reform the Chinese language to make universal education possible. Lu Xun was an active participant. His greatest works, such as Diary of a Madman and The True Story of Ah Q, exemplify this style of "peasant dirt literature" (Chinese: 乡土文学; pinyin: xiāngtǔ wénxué). The language is fresh and direct. The subjects are country peasants.

In 1925, Lu Xun began what may have been his first meaningful romantic relationship, with one of his students at the Beijing Women's College, Xu Guangping. In the March 18 Massacre of 1926, two of Lu Xun's students from Beijing Women's College were killed, prompting Lu Xun's article, “In Memory of Miss Liu Hezhen.” Later in 1926, when the warlord troops of Zhang Zuolin and Wu Peifu took over Beijing, Lu Xun left northern China and fled to Xiamen, where he taught at Xiamen University, but was disappointed by the petty disagreements and unfriendliness of the university's faculty. During the short time he lived in Xiamen, Lu Xun wrote his last collection of fiction, Old Tales Retold, which was published several years later, and most of his autobiography, published as Dawn Blossoms Plucked at Dusk. He also published a collection of prose poetry, Wild Grass.

In January 1927, Lu Xun and Xu moved to Guangzhou, where he was hired as the head of the Chinese department at Sun Yat-sen University. His first act in his position was to hire Xu as his personal assistant, as well as Xu Shoushang, one of his old classmates from Japan, as a lecturer. He edited and published several books and served as a guest lecturer at Whampoa Academy. Through his students there, he established connections within both the Kuomintang and Chinese Communist Party (CCP). After the Shanghai massacre in April 1927, he attempted to secure the release of several students through the university, but failed, leading him to resign and leave for the Shanghai International Settlement. By the time he left Guangzhou, he had established himself as one of the most famous writers in China.

In September 1927, Lu Xun received a letter from his student Tai Jingnong informing him that the Swedish explorer and writer Sven Hedin wished, through Liu Bannong, to nominate Lu Xun for the Nobel Prize in Literature. Lu Xun declined the proposal, stating that neither he nor any contemporary Chinese writer was yet deserving of the honor. Per Wästberg Espmark stated that the Swedish Academy in the mid-1930s had sounded out Lu Xun about a possible nomination, but that he declined. Göran Malmqvist, who disputed the authenticity of the correspondence between Lu Xun and Tai Jingnong, clarified that the Swedish Academy had never offered Lu Xun the prize itself, making it inaccurate to claim that Lu Xun had declined to receive it.

In late 1927, Lu Xun decided to renounce fiction and poetry in response to China’s deteriorating political situation and his own emotional turmoil, thereafter writing primarily political and polemical essays.

=== Later career ===
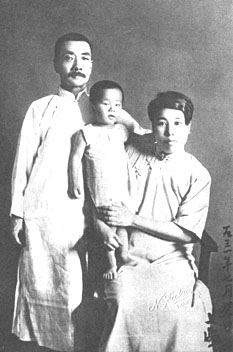
Lu Xun with Xu Guangping and their son, Zhou Haiying

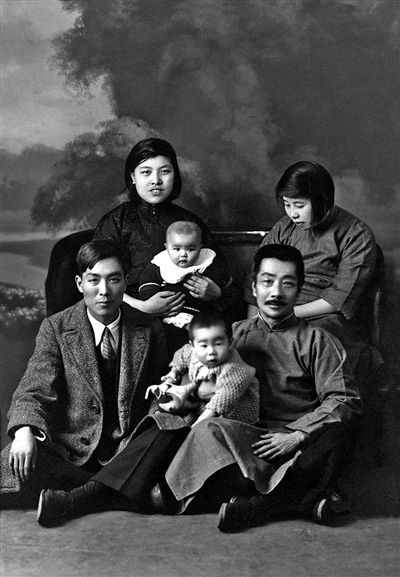
Lu Xun (right) sat in the front, and Xu Guangping sat behind him, their son (Zhou Haiying) in Lu Xun's arms.

In 1929, Lu Xun visited his mother, and reported that she was pleased at the news of Xu's pregnancy. Xu gave birth to a son named Haiying on 27 September. She was in labor with the baby for 27 hours. The child's name meant simply "Shanghai infant". His parents chose the name thinking that he could change it himself later, but he never did so. Haiying was Lu Xun's only child.

After moving to Shanghai, Lu Xun rejected all regular teaching positions (though he sometimes gave guest lectures at different campuses), and for the first time was able to make a living solely as a professional writer, with a monthly income of roughly 500 yuan. He was also appointed by the government as a "specially appointed writer" by the national Ministry of Higher Education, which secured him an additional 300 yuan per month.

Lu Xun began to study and identify with Marxist politics, made contact with local CCP members, and became involved in literary disputes with other leftist writers in the city. In 1930 Lu Xun became one of the co-founders of the League of Left-Wing Writers, but shortly after he moved to Shanghai other leftist writers accused him of being "an evil feudal remnant", the "best spokesman of the bourgeoisie", and "a counterrevolutionary split personality". The League continued in various forms until 1936, when the constant disputes among its members led the CCP to dissolve it.

In 1931, Lu Xun introduced the works of Käthe Kollwitz into China, when he published her woodcut Sacrifice in the journal The Big Dipper (Beidou). Kollwitz's art went on to become influential on the modern woodcut movement in China, as well as in etching and lithography.

In January 1931, the Kuomintang (KMT) passed new, stricter censorship laws, allowing for writers producing literature deemed "endangering the public" or "disturbing public order" to be imprisoned for life or executed. Later that month he went into hiding. In early February, less than a month later, the KMT executed twenty-four local writers (including five who belonged to the League) whom they had arrested under this law.

After the execution of the "24 Longhua Martyrs" (in addition to other students, friends, and associates), Lu Xun's political views became distinctly anti-KMT. In 1933 Lu Xun met Edgar Snow. Snow asked Lu Xun whether there were any Ah Q's left in China. Lu Xun responded, "It's worse now. Now it's Ah Q's who are running the country." Lu Xun complained of censorship of his works by KMT censors throughout the 1930s.

Lu Xun wrote a classical Chinese poem, A Lament for Ms. Ding, to commemorate Ding Ling, who on 14 May 1933 had been kidnapped from her residence in the Shanghai international settlement by the KMT.

Despite the unfavorable political climate, Lu Xun contributed regularly to a variety of periodicals in the 1930s, including Lin Yutang's humor magazine The Analects Fortnightly, and corresponded with writers in Japan as well as China.

Although he had renounced writing fiction years before, in 1934 he published his last collection of short stories, Old Tales Retold. In 1935, he sent a telegram to CCP forces in Shaanxi congratulating them on the recent completion of their Long March. The CCP requested that he write a novel about the communist revolution set in rural China, but he declined, citing his lack of background and understanding of the subject.

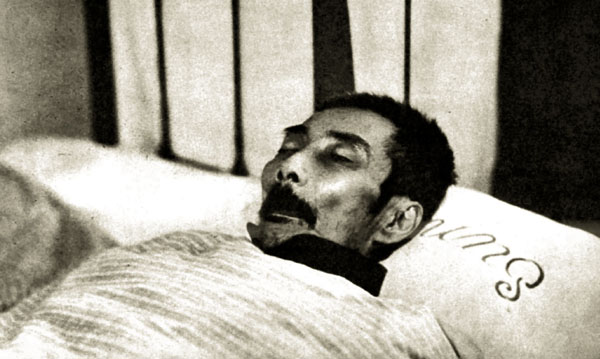
The remains of Lu Xun in Shanghai on October 19, 1936. Photograph by Sha Fei.

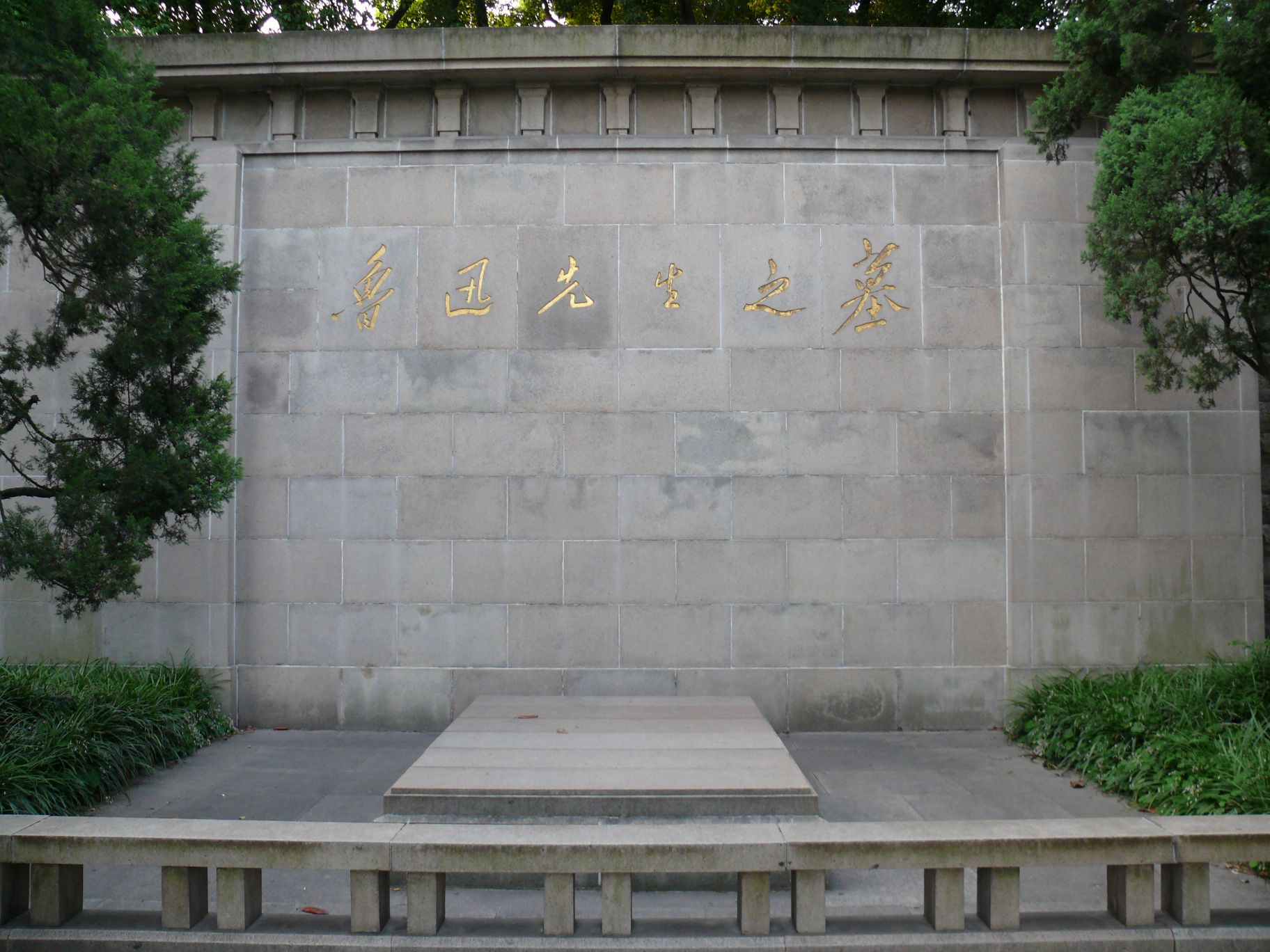
Lu Xun's tomb in Shanghai, 2010

In 1936, Lu Xun would meet Kaji Wataru. A Japanese dissident who had fled to Shanghai before the war. And would even employ Kaji as a Japanese translator of his work. After Lu Xun death in 1936, Kaji Wataru would be the only foreigner who served as pallbearer at Lu Xun's funeral.

Lu Xun was a heavy smoker, which may have contributed to the deterioration of his health throughout his last year. By 1936 he had developed chronic tuberculosis, and in March of that year he was stricken with bronchial asthma and a fever. The treatment for this involved draining 300 grams of fluid in the lungs through a puncture.

From June to August, he was again sick, and his weight dropped to only 83 pounds (38 kg). He recovered somewhat, and wrote two essays in the fall reflecting on mortality. These included "Death", and "This Too Is Life". A month before his death, he wrote: "Hold the funeral quickly... do not stage any memorial services. Forget about me, and care about your own life – you're a fool if you don't." Regarding his son, he wrote: "On no account let him become a good-for-nothing writer or artist."

=== Death ===
At 3:30 am on the morning of 18 October 1936, the author woke having great difficulty breathing. Dr. Sudo, his physician, was summoned, and Lu Xun was given injections to relieve the pain. His wife was with him throughout that night. Lu Xun died at 5:11 am the next morning, 19 October. Lu Xun's remains were interred in a mausoleum within Lu Xun Park in Shanghai. Mao Zedong later made the calligraphic inscription above his tomb.

He was survived by his son, Zhou Haiying.

== Legacy ==
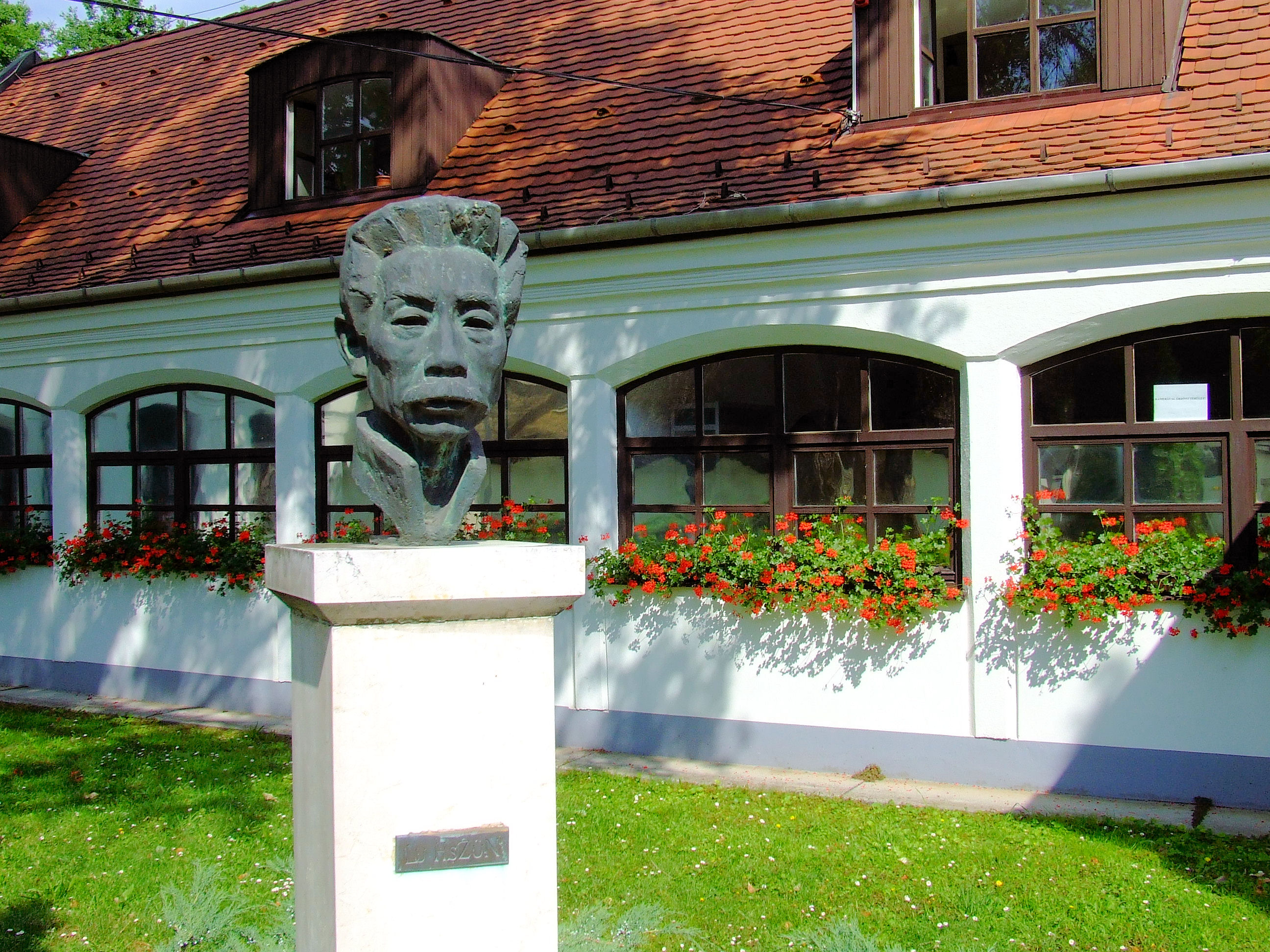
Bust of Lu Xun in Kiskőrös, Hungary

Lu Xun has been described by Nobel laureate Kenzaburō Ōe as "the greatest writer Asia produced in the 20th century." In 1986, Fredric Jameson cited Diary of a Madman as the "supreme example" of the "national allegory" form that all Third World literature takes. Gloria Davies compares Lu Xun to Nietzsche, saying that both were "trapped in the construction of a modernity which is fundamentally problematic". According to Leonardo Vittorio Arena, Lu Xun cultivated an ambiguous standpoint towards Nietzsche, a mixture of attraction and repulsion, the latter because of Nietzsche's excesses in style and content.

In China, Lu Xun’s legacy has been extensively interpreted and appropriated by the Chinese Communist Party. In his lifetime, even though left-leaning, Lu Xun kept a distance with any political organization as well as the CCP. In a letter to Cao Juren dated 30 April 1934, Lu Xun wrote that “if the old society collapses one day, I will probably end up wearing a red vest and sweeping the streets of Shanghai.” In a letter dated 15 July 1936, three months before his death, Lu Xun wrote that many readers assumed that The True Story of Ah Q was about the Xinhai Revolution, but that he had written not about events twenty years earlier, but about China “twenty or thirty years in the future.” After Lu Xun’s death in 1936, Li Ji, a close friend, recalled that Lu Xun had told Feng Xuefeng, his student and liaison with the CCP: “When the revolution succeeds, I will be the first to flee. Because you people will be the first to kill me.”

Shortly after Lu Xun's death, Mao Zedong called him "the saint of modern China". In 1940, Mao wrote in On New Democracy that “Lu Xun was not only a great writer, but also a great thinker and a great revolutionary,” a formulation that subsequently became the orthodox CCP assessment of Lu Xun. In 1942, at the Yan'an Forum on Literature and Art, Mao quoted Lu Xun to urge his audience to be "a willing ox", but told writers and artists who believed in freedom of expression that, because CCP areas were already liberated, they did not need to be as sharp as Lu Xun. After the establishment of the People’s Republic of China in 1949, Lu Xun was firmly settled as a center in the communist literary canon and became widely taught in schools, even as many of his associates were persecuted, including his brother Zhou Zuoren. According to Lu Xun's son Zhou Haiying, Mao Zedong told Luo Jinan in 1957 that, had Lu Xun lived, he would have “either remained silent or been imprisoned.” During the Cultural Revolution, Lu Xun’s works were among the very few books still permitted to be published in China.

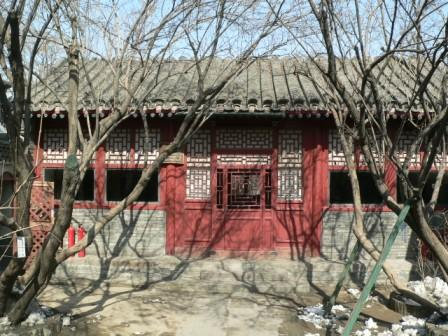
Lu Xun Museum in Beijing

Since the 2000s, periodic revisions to Chinese school textbooks involving the addition or removal of Lu Xun’s works have attracted public attention and been speculated as reflecting shifts in the CCP’s ideological direction. Julia Lovell, who has translated Lu Xun's writing, commented on one of the removals that it might be "an attempt to discourage the youth of today from Lu Xun's inconveniently fault-finding habits."

In the Xi Jinping era, Lu Xun has increasingly been presented as a patriotic cultural symbol rather than as an anti-establishment critic. Mao admired Lu’s attacks on what both saw as the cruelty, backwardness, and hypocrisy of old China. Xi’s emphasis on cultural confidence and the rehabilitation of traditional Chinese culture, however, sits uneasily with Lu Xun’s relentless critiques.

Because of his leftist political involvement and his status in the PRC, Lu Xun's works were banned in Taiwan until the late 1980s.

Lu Xun completed volumes of translations, notably from Russian. He particularly admired Nikolai Gogol and made a translation of Dead Souls. His own first story's title, Diary of a Madman, was inspired by Gogol's story of the same name. As a left-wing writer, Lu Xun played an important role in the development of modern Chinese literature. His books were and remain highly influential and popular today, both in China and internationally. Lu Xun's works appear in high school textbooks in both China and Japan. He is known to Japanese by the name Rojin (ロジン; 魯迅).

Lu Xun had a relationship to Esperanto movement in China. He published the translated work in Japanese of Esperantist Vasilij Erošenko in Shanghai after Erosenko had been expelled for "Bolshevism" from Japan.

Lu Xun was also a leader of the Woodcut Movement in China (1930–1950) and widely recognized as a pioneer of the rise of the woodcut print in China. After encountering new printmaking techniques in Japan, Lu Xun embraced the art form, envisioning it as a medium to promote social change and "an alternative socialist road to art." Through writings, lectures, and woodcut print publications, Lu Xun was instrumental in inspiring a generation in China towards the black-and-white woodcut.

Various things are named after him. These include the Lu Xun Literary Prize; Asteroid (233547) 2007 JR27 Luxun; and the Lu Hsun crater on Mercury. The artist Shi Lu Xun chose the second half of his pen name to reflect his admiration for Lu Xun.

== Style and thought ==
Lu Xun was a versatile writer. He wrote using both traditional Chinese conventions and 19th century European literary forms. His style has been described in equally broad terms, conveying both "sympathetic engagement" and "ironic detachment" at different moments. Particularly in his early novellas, Lu Xun wrote about characters who were weak, indecisive, frustrated, and largely the victims of oppressive Chinese culture.

His essays are often incisive in his societal commentary, and in his stories his mastery of the vernacular language and tone make some of his literary works (like "The True Story of Ah Q") hard to convey through translation. In them, he frequently treads a fine line between criticizing the follies of his characters and sympathizing with those very follies. Lu Xun was a master of irony and satire (as can be seen in "The True Story of Ah Q") and yet could also write impressively direct prose ("My Old Home", "A Little Incident").

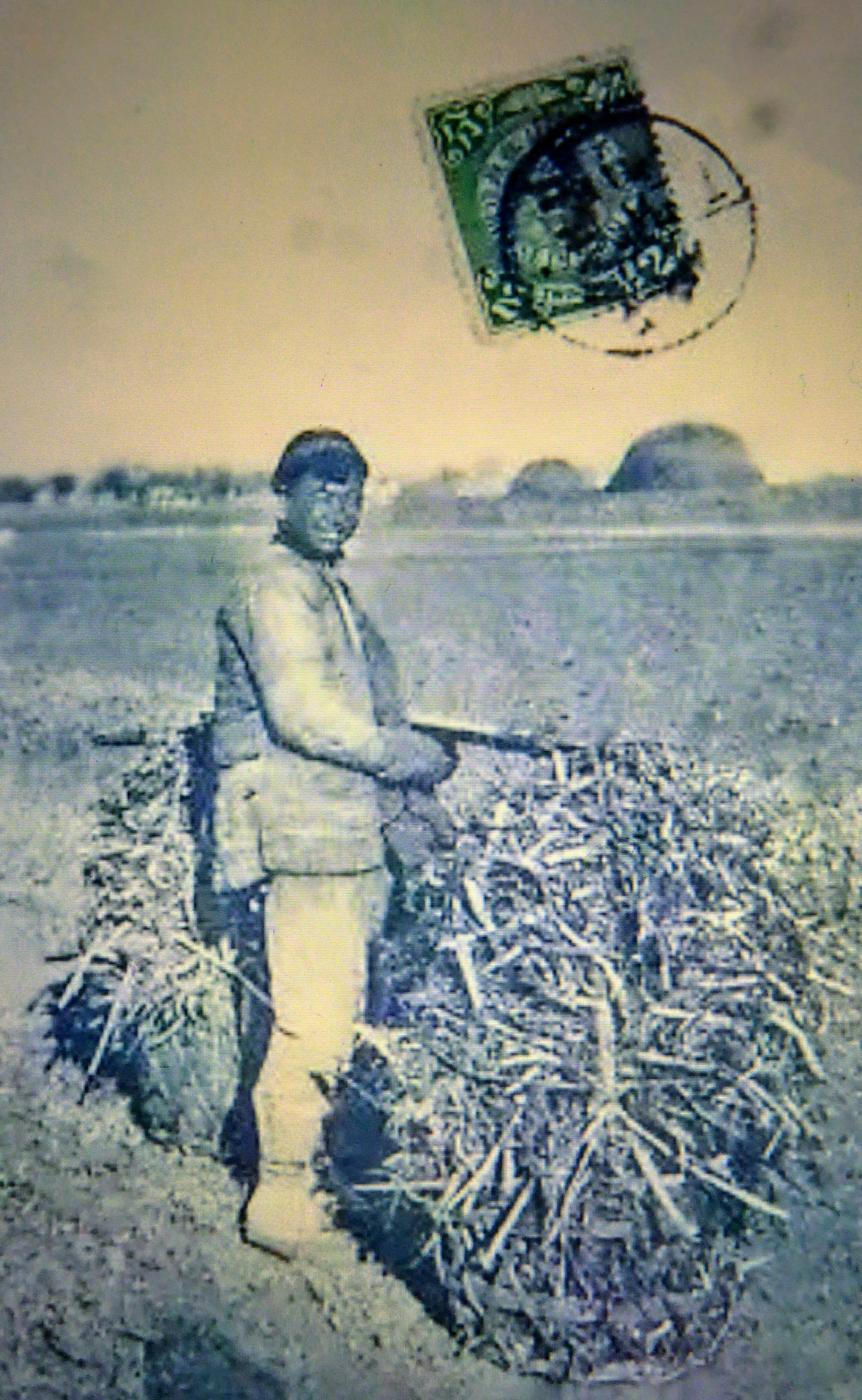
Chinese peasant in Tianjin c. 1909

Lu Xun is typically regarded by Mao Zedong as the most influential Chinese writer who was associated with the May Fourth Movement. He produced harsh criticism of social problems in China, particularly in his analysis of the "Chinese national character". He was sometimes called a "champion of common humanity".

Lu Xun felt that the Xinhai Revolution of 1911 had been a failure. In 1925 he opined, "I feel the so-called Republic of China has ceased to exist. I feel that, before the revolution, I was a slave, but shortly after the revolution, I have been cheated by slaves and have become their slave." He even recommended that his readers heed the critique of Chinese culture in Chinese Characteristics by the missionary writer Arthur Smith. His disillusionment with politics led him to conclude in 1927 that "revolutionary literature" alone could not bring about radical change. Rather, "revolutionary men" needed to lead a revolution using force. In the end, he experienced profound disappointment with the new Nationalist government, which he viewed as ineffective and even harmful to China.

Lu Xun contended that "[i]f Chinese characters are not exterminated, there can be no doubt that China will perish."

He advocated for art often considered by intellectuals as "low-brow", such as woodcuts, serial illustrations, and cartoons (manhua). For example, Lu Xun contended that manhua dealt with realistic aspects of life "and because they are realistic, they are extremely powerful."

== Bibliography ==
Lu Xun's works became known to English readers as early as 1926 with the publication in Shanghai of The True Story of Ah Q, translated by George Kin Leung, and more widely beginning in 1936 with an anthology edited by Edgar Snow and Nym Wales Living China, Modern Chinese Short Stories, in which Part One included seven of Lu Xun's stories and a short biography based on Snow's talks with Lu Xun . However, there was not a complete translation of the fiction until the four-volume set of his writings, which included Selected Stories of Lu Xun Hsun translated by Yang Hsien-yi and Gladys Yang. Another full selection was William A. Lyell's Diary of a Madman and Other Stories (Honolulu: University of Hawaii Press, 1990). In 2009, Penguin Classics published a complete translation by Julia Lovell of his fiction, The Real Story of Ah-Q and Other Tales of China: The Complete Fiction of Lu Xun , which the scholar Jeffrey Wasserstrom said "could be considered the most significant Penguin Classic ever published."

The Lyrical Lu Xun : a Study of his Classical-style Verse—a book by Jon Eugene von Kowallis (Honolulu: University of Hawaii Press, 1996) – includes a complete introduction to Lu Xun's poetry in the classical style, with Chinese characters, literal and verse translations, and a biographical introduction which summarizes his life in relation to his poetry.

In 2017, Harvard University Press published a book of his essays translated by Eileen J. Cheng, titled Jottings under Lamplight.

=== Short stories ===
- Nostalgia (1913) 吶喊 (pinyin: Nàhǎn),1923, translated as Call to Arms (Yang and Yang), Cheering from the Sidelines (Lyell) and Outcry (Lovell):
- Diary of a Madman (Chinese: 狂人日記; pinyin: Kuángrén Rìjì), 1918
- Kong Yiji (Chinese: 孔乙己; pinyin: Kǒng Yǐjǐ), 1918
- Medicine (Chinese: 藥; pinyin: Yào), 1919
- Tomorrow (Chinese: 明天; pinyin: Míngtiān), 1920
- An Incident (Chinese: 一件小事; pinyin: Yījiàn Xiǎoshì), 1920
- The Story of Hair (Chinese: 頭髮的故事; pinyin: Tóufà de gùshì), 1920
- A Storm in a Teacup (Chinese: 風波; pinyin: Fēngbō), 1920
- My Old Home, also translated as "Hometown" (Chinese: 故鄉; pinyin: Gùxiāng), 1921
- The Dragon Boat Festival, also translated as "The Double Fifth Festival" (Chinese: 端午節; pinyin: Duānwǔjié), 1922
- The White Light (Chinese: 白光; pinyin: Báiguāng), 1922
- The Rabbits and the Cat (Chinese: 兔和貓; pinyin: Tù hé Māo), 1922
- The Comedy of the Ducks (Chinese: 鴨的喜劇; pinyin: Yā de Xǐjù), 1922
- Village Opera (Chinese: 社戲; pinyin: Shèxì), 1922
- Preface to Call to Arms, 1922

徬徨, 1926, translated as Wandering (Yang and Yang), Wondering Where to Turn (Lyell) and Hesitation (Lovell):

- The New Year's Sacrifice (Chinese: 祝福; pinyin: Zhùfú), 1924
- In the Wine Shop, also translated as "In the Drinking House" (Chinese: 在酒楼上; pinyin: Zài Jiǔlóu shàng), 1924
- A Happy Family (Chinese: 幸福的家庭; pinyin: Xìngfú de Jiātíng), 1924
- Soap (Chinese: 肥皂; pinyin: Féizào), 1924
- The Eternal Flame, 1924
- Public Exhibition, 1925
- Old Mr. Gao, 1925
- The Misanthrope, also translated as "The Loner" (Chinese: 孤獨者; pinyin: Gūdú Zhě), 1925
- Regret for the Past, also translated as "Sadness", or "Regrets for the Past" (Chinese: 傷逝; Chinese: Shāngshì), 1925
- Brothers, 1925
- Divorce (Chinese: 離婚; pinyin: Líhūn), 1925

故事新編 (1935), translated as Old Tales Retold (Yang and Yang) and Old Stories Retold (Lovell):

- Mending Heaven, 1935
- The Flight to the Moon (Chinese: 奔月; pinyin: Bēn Yuè), 1926
- Curbing the Flood, 1935
- Gathering Vetch, 1935
- Forging the Swords (Chinese: 鑄劍; pinyin: Zhù Jiàn), 1926
- Leaving the Pass, 1935
- Opposing Aggression, 1934
- Resurrect the Dead, 1935

=== Novella ===
- The True Story of Ah Q (Chinese: 阿Q正傳; pinyin: Ā Q Zhèngzhuàn), 1921

=== Essays ===
- "On the Power of Mara Poetry", 1908
- "My Views on Chastity", 1918
- "What Is Required to Be a Father Today", 1919
- "Knowledge Is a Crime", 1919
- "What Happens After Nora Walks Out?" Based on a talk given at the Beijing Women's Normal College, 26 December 1923. In Ding Ling and Lu Xun Hsun, The Power of Weakness. The Feminist Press (2007), pp. 84–93.
- "My Moustache", 1924
- "Thoughts Before the Mirror", 1925
- "On Deferring Fair Play" , 1925

=== Miscellaneous ===
- 中國小說史略 (1925), based on lectures from 1920, translated as A Brief History of Chinese Fiction (Yang and Yang, 1959)
- 野草 (pinyin: Yěcǎo), 1927, prose poems, translated as Wild Grass (Yang and Yang, 2003); Weeds (Turner, 2019); and Wild Grass (Cheng, 2022)
- 唐宋傳奇集,1927–28, editor of an anthology of chuanqi, translated as Anthology of Tang and Song Tales: The Tang Song Chuanqi Ji of Lu Xun (World Scientific, 2020)
- 朝花夕拾, 1932, a collection of essays about his youth, translated as Dawn Blossoms Plucked at Dusk (Yang and Yang, 1976) and Morning Blossoms Gathered at Dusk (Cheng, 2022)
- 熱風
- 華蓋集
- 華蓋集続編
- 墳
- 而已集
- 三閑集
- 二心集
- 偽自由書
- 南腔北調集
- 准風月談
- 花邊文學
- 且介亭雑文
- 且介亭雑文二集
- 且介亭雑文末編
- 集外集
- 集外集拾遺
- 集外集拾遺補編

== See also ==
- Zhou Jianren
- Lu Xun Literary Institute
- Lu Xun Literary Prize
- Lu Xun Native Place
- Gu xiaoshuo gouchen
