= Shi Guo =

Chinese artist (born 1953)

- 石果
- Born: July 1953 (age 73); Xi'an, China
- Education: Xi'an Academy of Fine Arts
- Occupation: Artist
- Years active: 1977–Present
- Parent: Shi Lu (father)

Shi Guo (Chinese: 石果; 1953) is a Chinese artist known for his experimental Chinese ink painting. He is the son of Chinese traditional painting artist Shi Lu.

== Early years ==
Shi Guo was born in 1953 in Xi'an. Starting at the age of 17 in 1970, he learned traditional Chinese painting and calligraphy from his father, Shi Lu, who was a renowned modern Chinese painter. In 1977, he was admitted to the Chinese Painting Department of Xi'an Academy of Fine Arts and graduated in 1982.

== Career ==
=== 1980s ===
From 1982 to 1985, he served as an art officer in the Xi'an Municipal Federation of Literary and Art Circles. In 1985, he was employed by the Zhuhai Municipal Federation of Literary and Art Circles in Guangdong Province to establish the Zhuhai Academy of Painting and became a member of the China Artists Association the same year. He served as the vice president of the Zhuhai Academy of Painting from 1986 to 1989.

=== 1990s ===
Since the 1990s, he has been involved in the research and creation of contemporary Chinese "Experimental Ink Painting", and is one of the founding artists of this style. In 1994, Shi Guo worked at the Zhuhai Municipal Artists Association, serving as the director of the Theory Department and the editor-in-chief of the Zhuhai Art Newspaper. In 1995, he resigned to become a freelance painter. He traveled to the United States to engage in artistic activities and conducted a one-year study tour.

=== 2000 to present ===
Starting in 2004, Shi Guo taught the "Experimental Ink Painting" course in the Chinese Painting Department at Xi'an Academy of Fine Arts. He was also appointed as the director of the Art Teaching and Research Section and an associate professor at the Beijing Institute of Technology, Zhuhai in the same year. He was elected as the "2004 Zhuhai Cultural Figure of the Year". From 2005 to 2016, he served as a professor and the dean of the School of Design and Arts at Beijing Institute of Technology, Zhuhai. He retired in 2016 and now works as a freelance artist.

== Publications ==
- 1999, "Contemporary Chinese Experimental Ink and Wash Painting: Black and White History" (author)
- 1999, "Chinese Master Painters Series: Theories on Shi Lu’s Paintings" (editor)
