= Storm in a Teacup (short story) =

1920 short story by Lu Xun

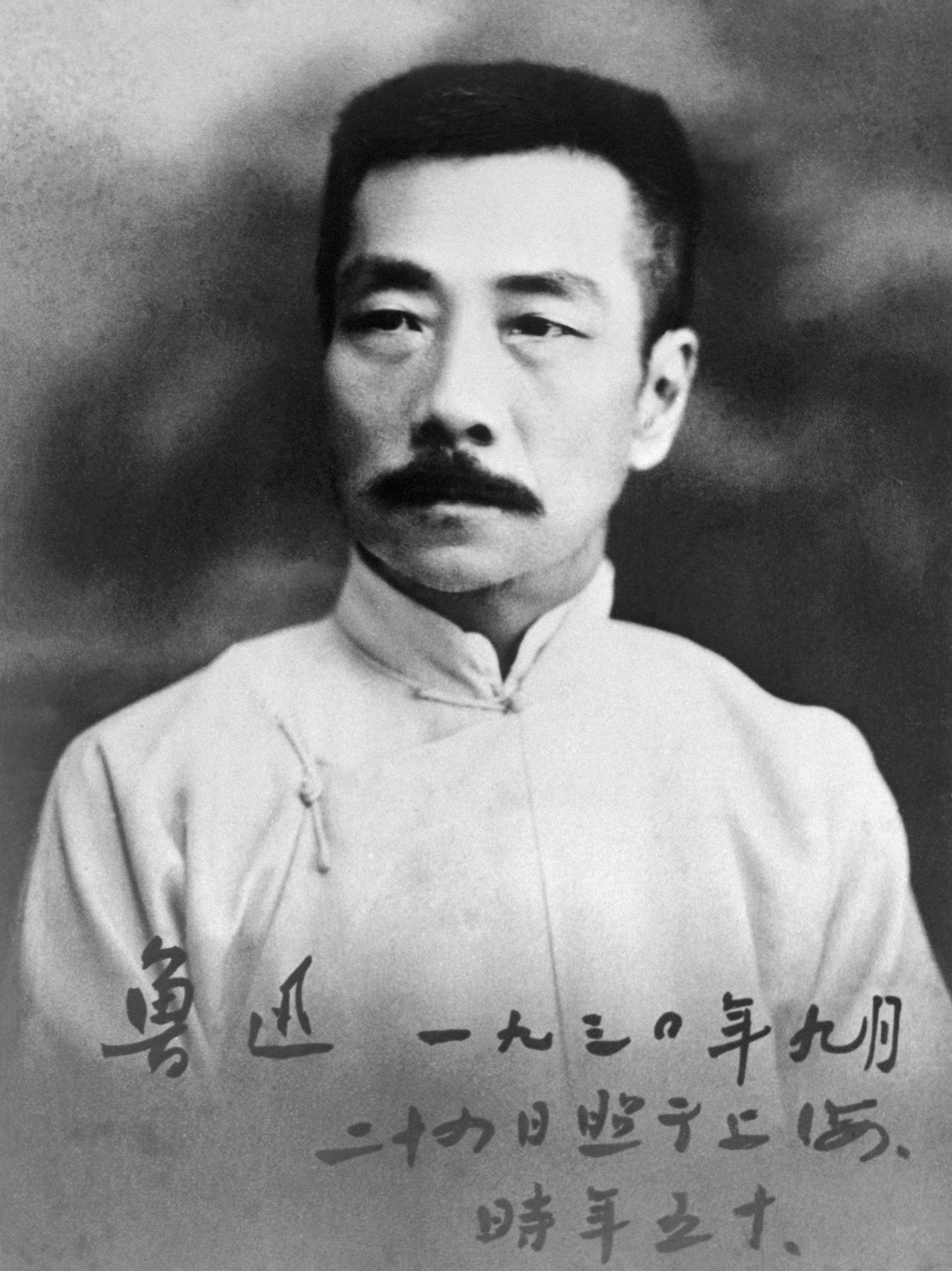
- Lu Xun
- Author: Lu Xun
- Original title: 風波
- Language: Chinese
- Published: September 1920
- Original text: 風波 at Chinese Wikisource
- Translation: Storm in a Teacup at Wikisource

Storm in a Teacup
- Traditional Chinese: 風波
- Simplified Chinese: 风波
- Literal meaning: "Storm"
Transcriptions
Standard Mandarin
- Hanyu Pinyin: Fēngbō

"Storm in a Teacup" (simplified Chinese: 风波; traditional Chinese: 風波; pinyin: Fēngbō; lit. 'Storm') is a short story by Lu Xun, the founder of modern Chinese literature. Originally published in September 1920 in the journal New Youth (新青年), it was later included in his first collection of short stories, Call to Arms (吶喊). A Chinese boatman hears news of the abortive Manchu Restoration of July 1917 and fears that he will be executed as he had abandoned the queue after the fall of the Qing dynasty. At the same time his neighbour, who has kept his, exults.

== Background ==
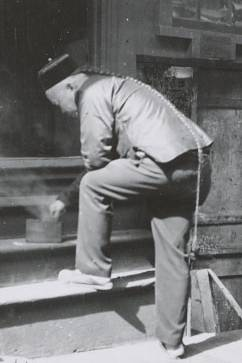
A Chinese man wearing a queue

In 1644, after the conquest of China by the Manchurian Qing dynasty, Han Chinese males were forced on pain of execution to adopt the queue, a Manchurian hairstyle consisting of shaving the forehead and wearing the rest of one's hair in a long plait. On the other hand, during the Taiping Rebellion, the revolutionaries would execute anyone who wore the queue as a presumed Qing loyalist. After the last emperor Puyi abdicated in 1912, the Republic of China was established and the queue was widely abandoned. In July 1917 the Qing loyalist Zhang Xun attempted to restore Puyi to the throne, but the revolt collapsed in a fortnight. Given the primitive communications infrastructure in China, this news took longer to spread to rural and remote areas.

== Synopsis ==
The boatman Sevenpounder (七斤) comes back to his village one night, bringing the news to his family that "the Emperor has returned to the Dragon Throne". He worries, as people in town had shaved off his queue during the revolution. Meanwhile, the innkeeper Zhao arrives. Zhao is renowned as the greatest scholar for ten miles round, as he reads the Romance of the Three Kingdoms. Zhao had only coiled up his queue, and has now let it down. Mrs Sevenpounder notices that he is wearing his special gown which he only does when an enemy has met with misfortune. Zhao bears Sevenpounder a grudge, and taunts him that he will now be executed. Trusting in Zhao's scholarship, Mrs Sevenpounder gives up all hope and curses her husband for having shaven off his queue. Another neighbour remembers that Mrs Sevenpounder did not object when her husband stopped growing his queue, and an argument breaks out.

A fortnight later, Mrs Sevenpounder notices that Mr Zhao has coiled up his queue again, and is not wearing his gown. The Sevenpounders relax, as it seems the emperor is not coming back after all. They begin binding their daughter's feet.
