= Queue (hairstyle) =

Hairstyle worn by the Jurchen and Manchu peoples of Manchuria

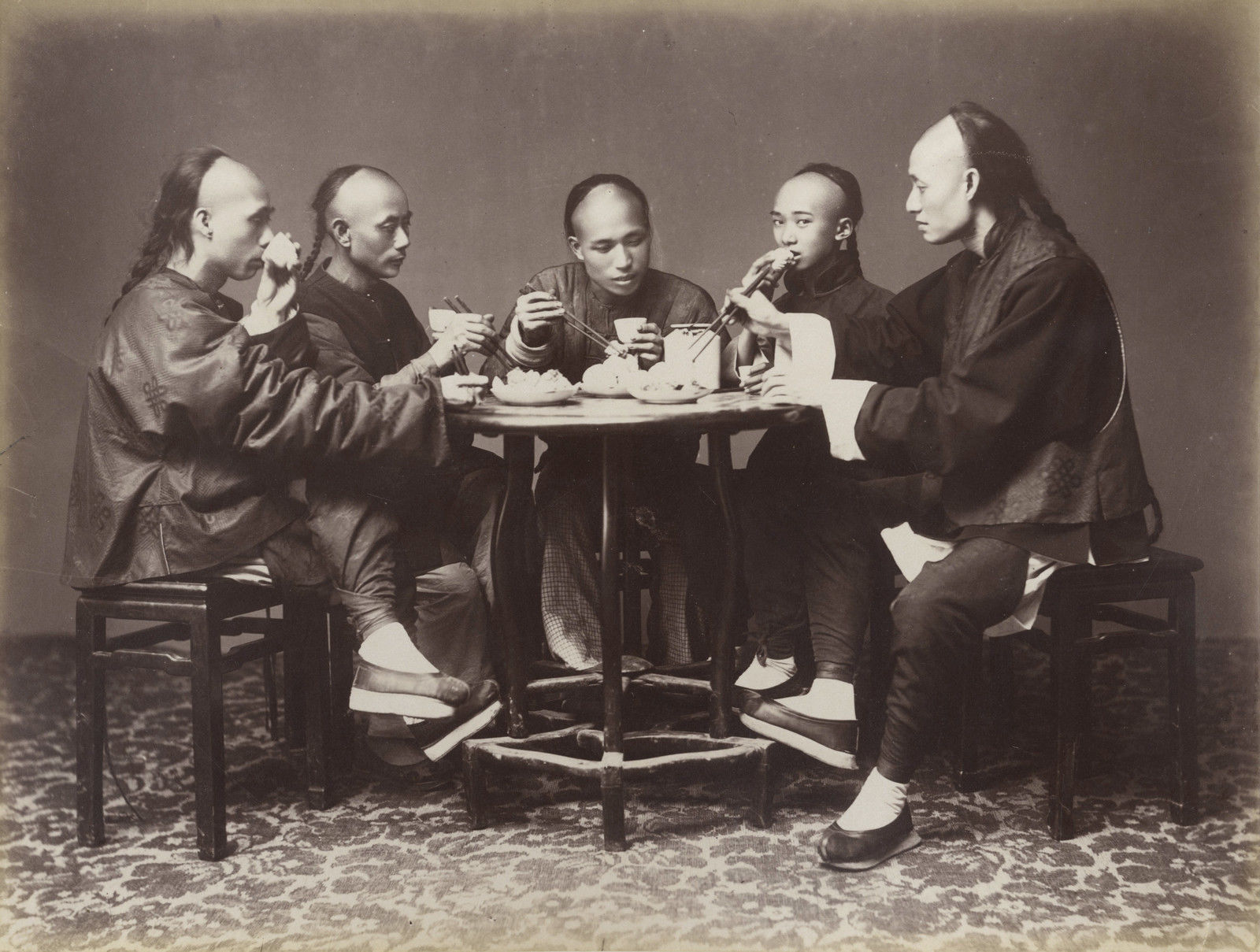
- Chinese men with queues c. 1880 (photographed by Lai Afong)

Chinese name
- Traditional Chinese: 辮子
- Simplified Chinese: 辫子
Transcriptions
Standard Mandarin
- Hanyu Pinyin: biànzi
Yue: Cantonese
- Jyutping: bin1 zi2

Min names
- Traditional Chinese: 頭鬃尾 毛尾仔 辮仔
Transcriptions
Southern Min
- Hokkien POJ: mn̂g-bué-á/mn̂g-bé-á thâu-chang-bué/thâu-chang-bé pīⁿ-á

Manchu name
- Manchu script: ᠰᠣᠨᠴᠣᡥᠣ
- Romanization: soncoho

A queue or cue is a hairstyle historically worn by the Jurchen and Manchu peoples of Manchuria. During the Manchu-led Qing dynasty, it was required to be worn by male Chinese subjects. The top of the scalp is shaved and the back portion of hair on the head is often grown long and is braided. The distinctive hairstyle led to its wearers being targeted during anti-Chinese riots in Australia and the United States.

The edict that Han Chinese men and others under Manchu rule give up their traditional hairstyles and wear the queue, the Tifayifu, was met with resistance, although opinions about the queue did change over time. Han women were never required to wear their hair in the traditional women's Manchu style, liangbatou, although that too was a symbol of Manchu identity.

Short queues were also worn by soldiers of European and North American armies in the 18th century, a custom that ended during the Napoleonic Wars.

== Predecessors and origin ==
The queue hairstyle predates the Manchus. The Chinese word for queue, bian, meant plaited hair or a cord. The term bian, when used to describe the braid in the Manchu hairstyle, was originally applied by the Han dynasty to the Xiongnu. Jurchen people wore a queue like the Manchu, the Khitan people wore theirs in Tartar style and during the Tang dynasty, tribes in the west wore braids. The Xianbei and Wuhuan were said to shave their heads, while Xiongnu had queues. Other evidence from Chinese histories indicate that the Tuoba or Tabgach groups of the Xianbei wore braids, since they were called "braided" by the southern Chinese. However, their hairstyle is hidden in depictions due to a hood they wore. The Liu Song dynasty's records called them "braided caitiff", suolu, while Southern Qi's history said they wore their "hair hanging down the back" (pifa), and called them suotou, "braided". A braid of hair was found at Zhalairuoer in a Tuoba grave.

Han Chinese also made the peoples they conquered undo their queues. To show submission to the Han Chinese of the Sui dynasty, the people of Turfan (Gaochang) undid their queues, as did the Göktürks upon surrendering to the Tang dynasty. Hairstyles showed affiliation to a tribal confederation or dynasty. In the Western Wei cave 285 at the Mogao Caves in Dunhuang, Xianbei people are depicted with small queues hanging from their necks.

After overthrowing the Mongol Yuan dynasty, Zhu Yuanzhang, the first Ming emperor passed a law on mandatory hairstyle on 24 September 1392 mandating that all males grow their hair long and making it illegal for them to shave part of their foreheads while leaving strands of hair, which was the Mongol hairstyle. The penalty for both the barber and the person who was shaved and his sons was castration if they cut their hair and their families were to be sent to the borders for exile. This helped eradicate the partially shaved Mongol hairstyles.

The Tangut people of the Western Xia may have inherited hairstyle influences from the Tuoba. It resembled a monk's hairstyle but was not exactly like their tonsure, it left the face to be framed on the sides and forehead by a fringe of hair by shaving the head top and leaving it bald. This made sure the Tibetans and Song Chinese could be told apart from shaved Tanguts. It was imposed by the Tangut emperor, Jingzong, threatening that their throats would be cut if they did not shave within three days. The emperor was the first one to shave. Unlike the tonsure of the Tangut Western Xia, the Jurchen hairstyle of wearing the queue combined with shaving the crown was not the invention of an emperor of the dynasty but was an established Jurchen hairstyle which showed who submitted to Jin rule. This Jurchen queue and shaving hairstyle was not enforced on the Han Chinese in the Jin after an initial attempt to do so which was a rebuke to Jurchen values. The Jin at first attempted to impose Jurchen hairstyle and clothes on the Han population during the Jin but the order was taken back. They also banned intermarriage.

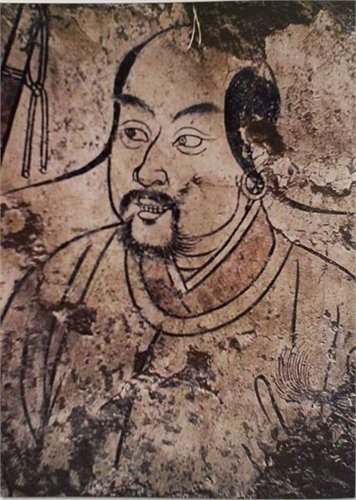
Khitan man in tomb painting in Aohan Banner, Inner Mongolia

Manchu Jurchen men had queues, while Mongol men swept their hair behind their ears and plaited them, Turk men wore loose hair and Xiongnu men braided their hair. Khitan males grew hair from their temples but shaved the crown of their heads. The Han Chinese men living in the Liao dynasty were not required to wear the shaved Khitan hairstyle which Khitan men wore to distinguish their ethnicity, unlike the Qing dynasty which mandated wearing of the Manchu hairstyle for men. Khitan men left only two separate patches of hair on each of the forehead's sides in front of each ear in tresses while they shaved the top of their head. Khitan wore felt hats, fur clothes and woolen cloth and the Liao emperor switched between Han and Khitan clothing. Khitan officials used gold ornamented ribbons to found their hair locks around their foreheads, covering their heads with felt hats according to the Ye Longli's (Yeh Lung-li) Qidan Guozhi (Ch'i-tan kuo-chih). Khitan wore the long side fringes and shaved pates. Tomb murals of Khitan hairstyle show only some hair remaining near the neck and forehead with the rest of the head shaved. Only at the temples were hair left while the crown was shaven. The absence of Khitan clothes and hairstyles on a painting of riders previously identified as Khitan has led to experts questioning their purported identity. Khitan men might have differentiate between classes by wearing different patterns on their small braids hanging off their shaved foreheads. They wore the braids occasionally with a forehead fringe with some shaving off all the forehead. Some Han men adopted and mixed or combined Han clothing with Khitan clothing with Khitan boots and Han clothes or wearing Khitan clothes. Han women on the other hand did not adopt Khitan dress and continued wearing Han dress.

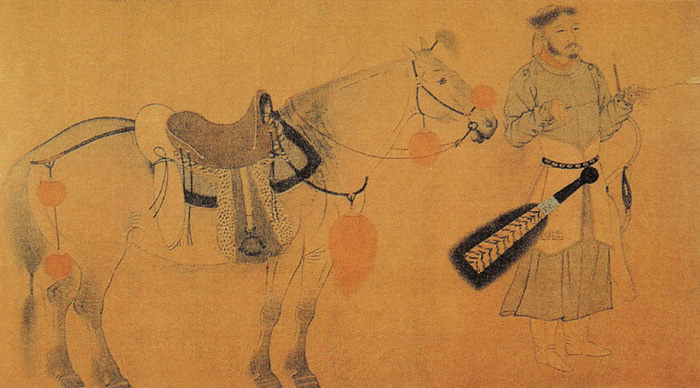
Yelü Bei

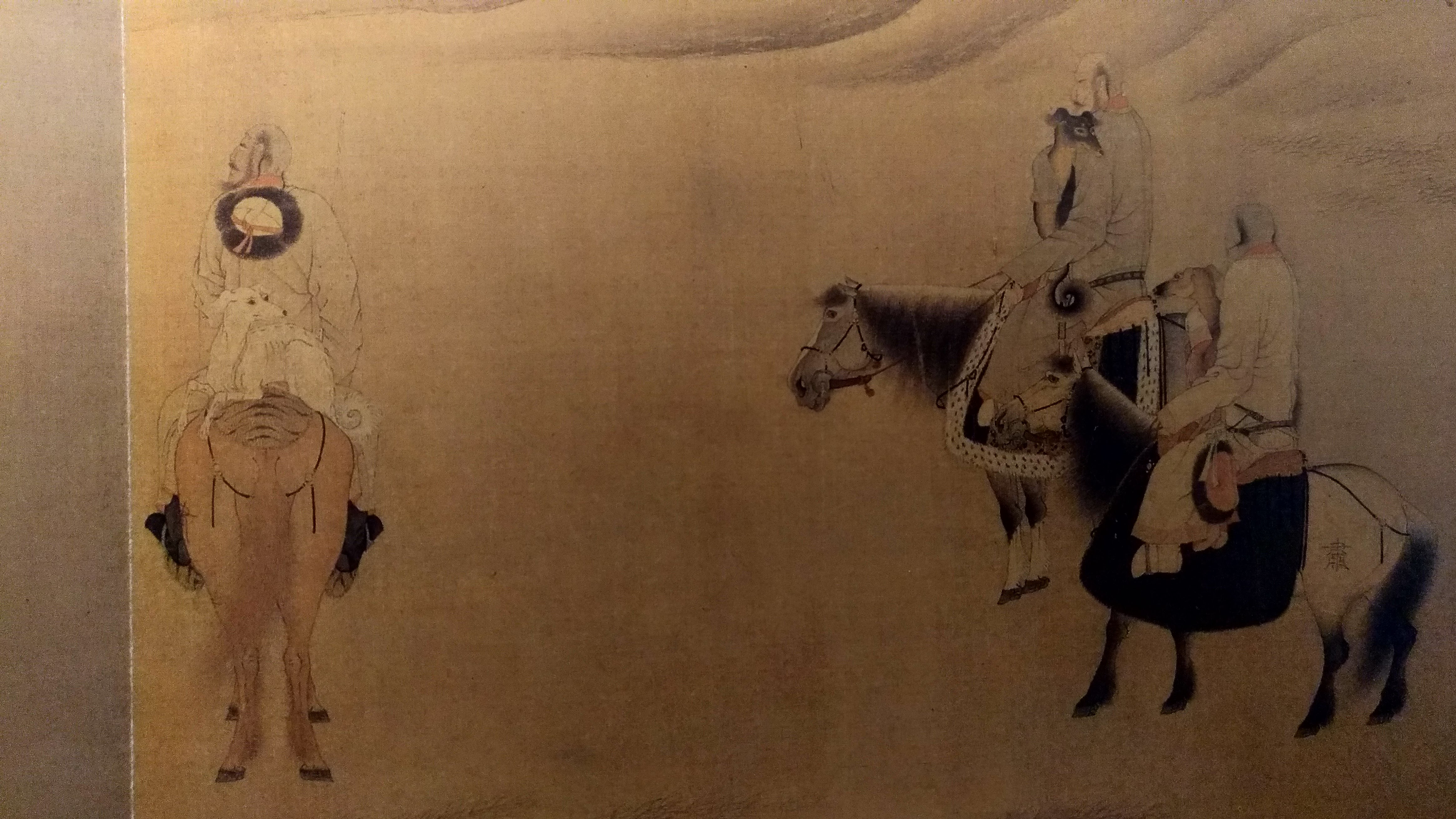
Horsemen

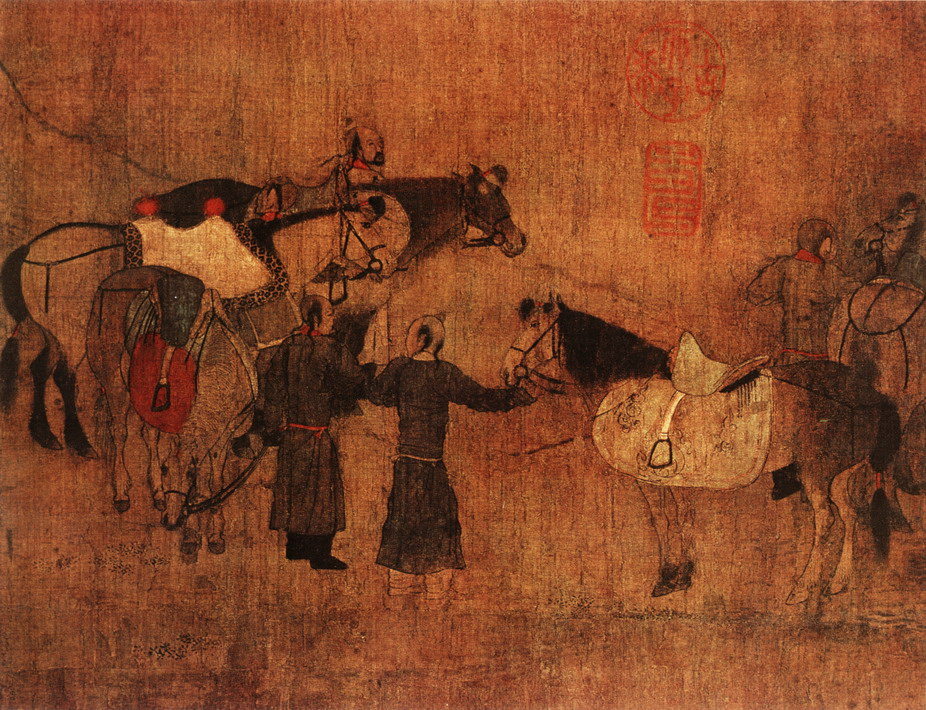
Horsemen at rest

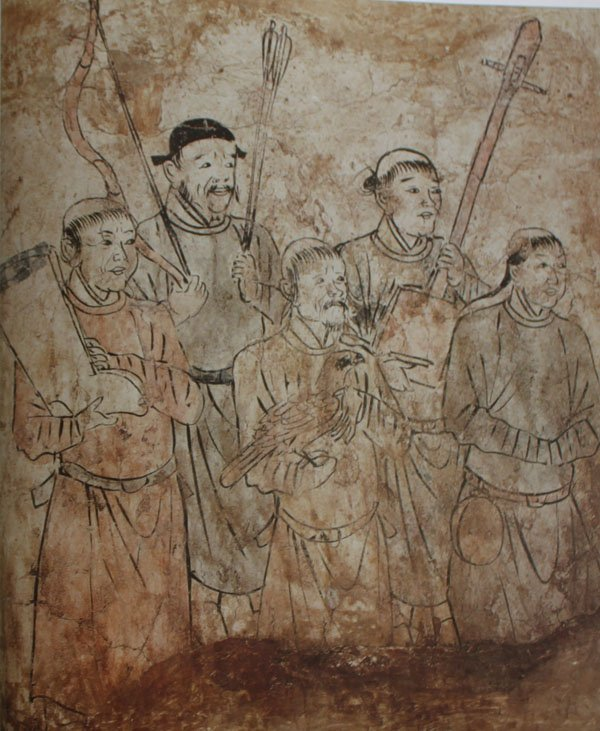
Hunters

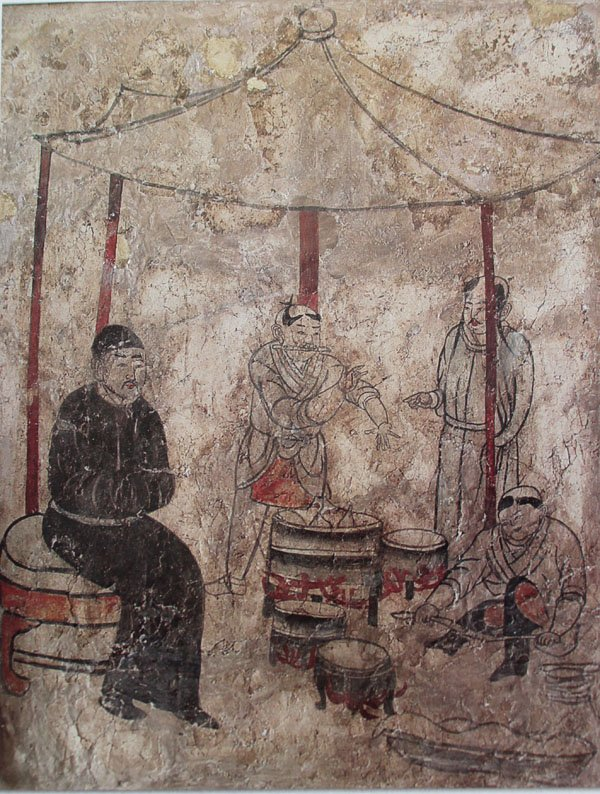
Cooks

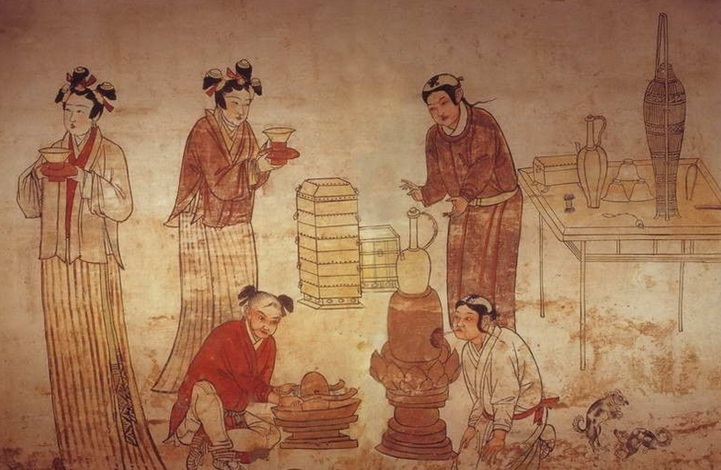
Boys and girls

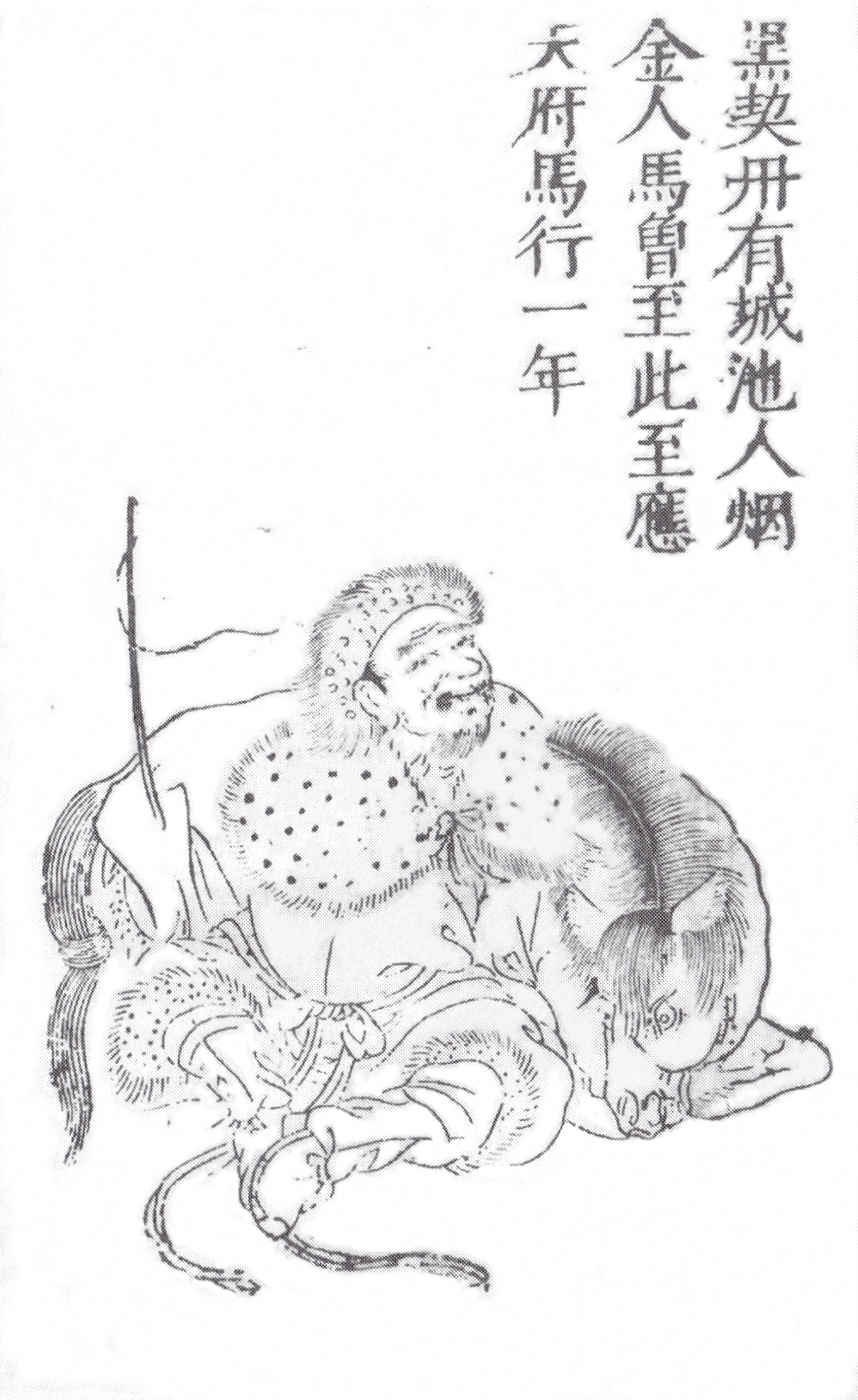

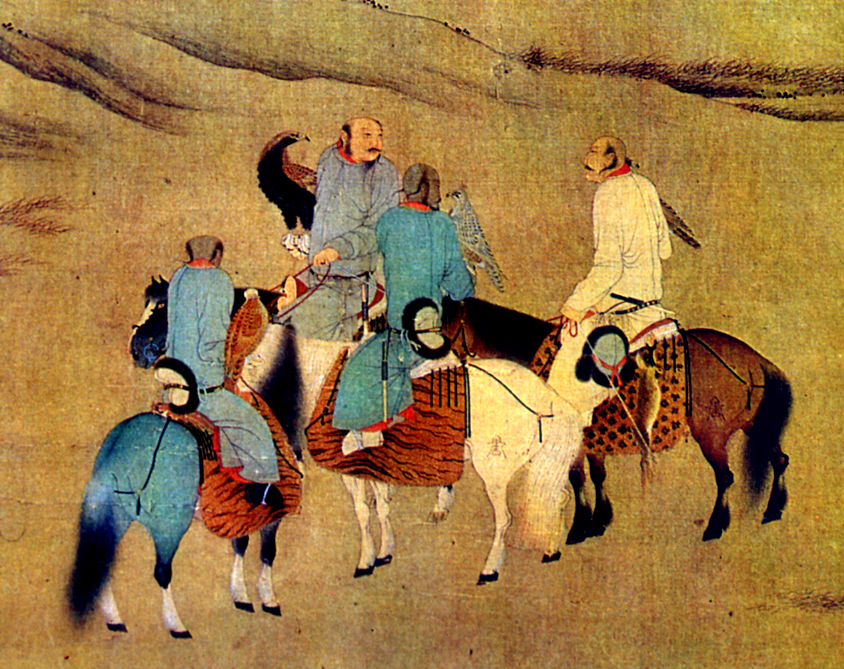

=== Jurchen queue ===
Jurchen men, like their Manchu descendants, wore their hair in queues. In 1126, the Jurchen ordered male Han within their conquered territories to adopt the Jurchen hairstyle by shaving the front of their heads and to adopt Jurchen dress, but the order was lifted. Some Han rebels impersonated Jurchen by wearing their hair in the Jurchen "pigtail" to strike fear within the Jurchen population.

== The Manchu queue ==
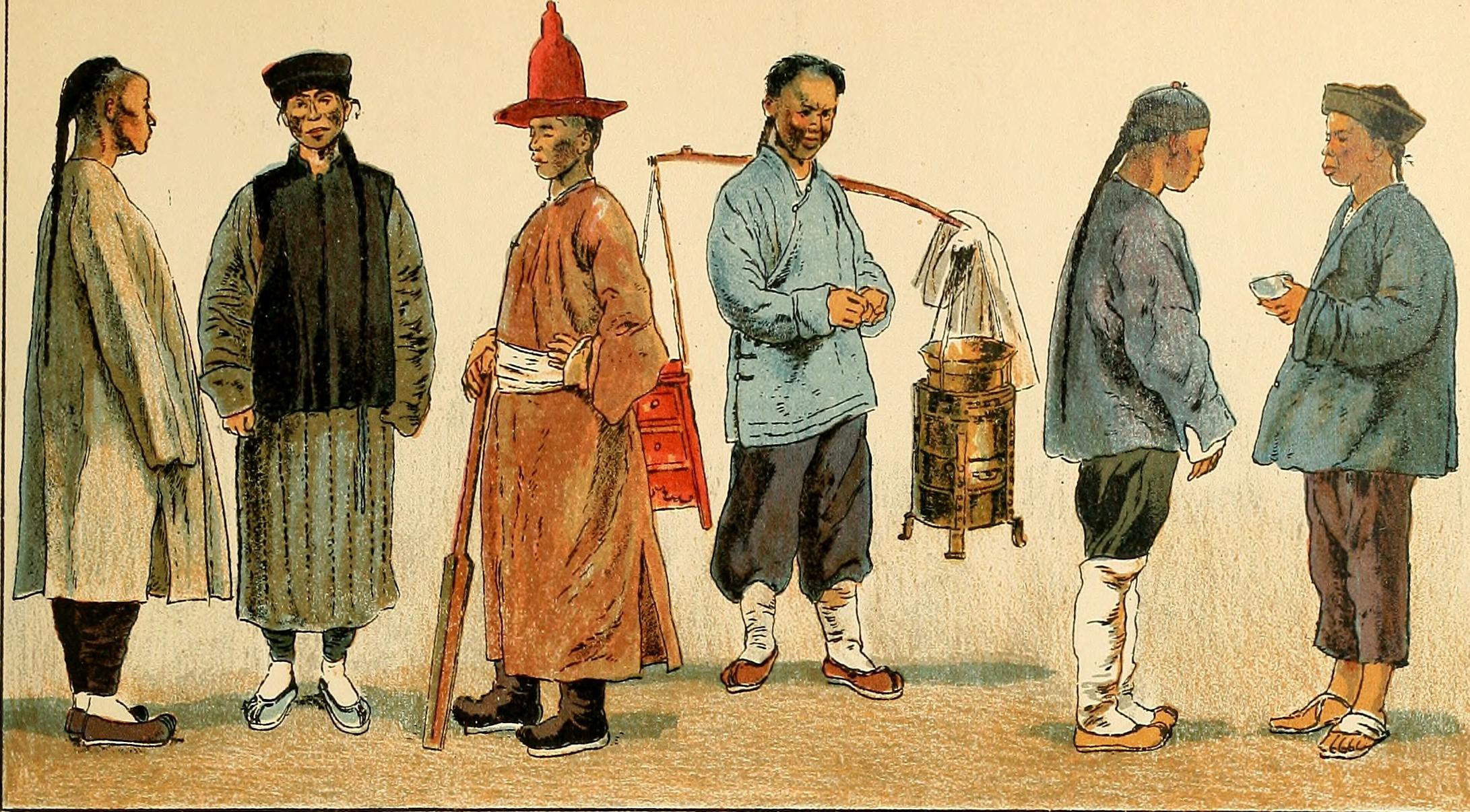
Manchu queues

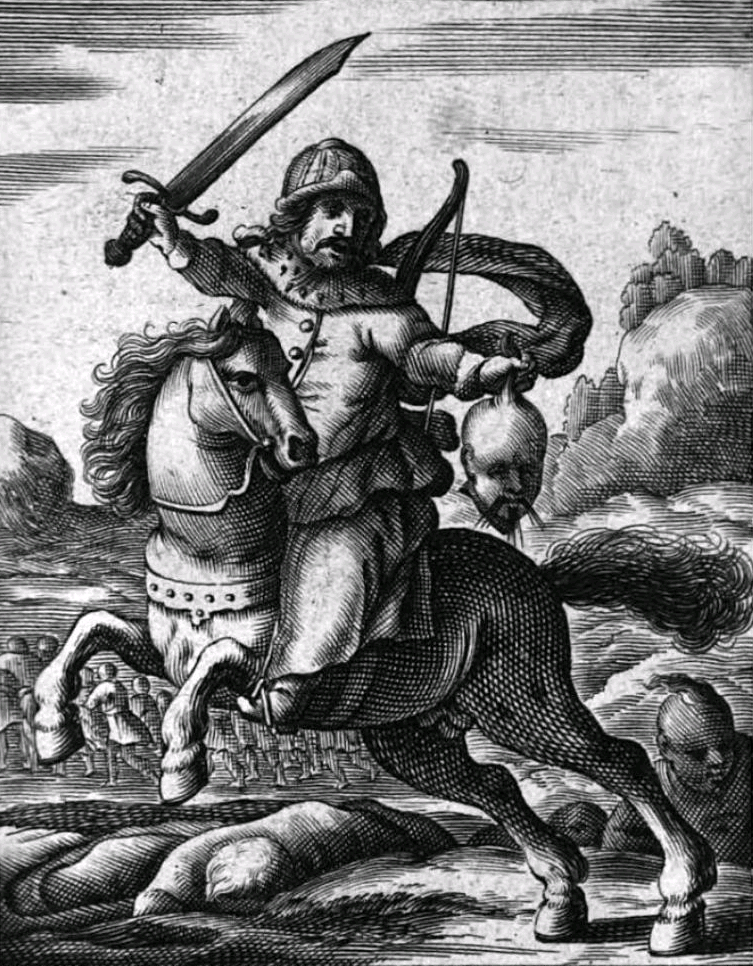
A European artist's conception of a Manchu warrior in China – surprisingly, holding the severed head of an enemy by its queue. Later historians have noted the queue looking more like Cossack chupryna as an inconsistency in the picture. (From the cover of Martino Martini's Regni Sinensis a Tartari devastati enarratio, 1661.)

The queue (called soncoho in Manchu) was a specifically male hairstyle worn by the Manchu from central Manchuria and later imposed on the Han Chinese during the Qing dynasty. The hair on the front of the head was shaved off above the temples every ten days and the remainder of the hair was braided into a long braid.

The Manchu hairstyle was forcefully introduced to Han Chinese and other ethnicities like the Nanai in the early 17th century during the transition from Ming to Qing. Nurhaci of the Aisin Gioro clan declared the establishment of the Later Jin dynasty, later becoming the Qing dynasty of China, after Ming dynasty forces in Liaodong defected to his side. The Ming general of Fushun, Li Yongfang, defected to Nurhaci after Nurhaci promised him rewards, titles, and Nurhaci's own granddaughter in marriage. Other Han Chinese generals in Liaodong proceeded to defect with their armies to Nurhaci and were given women from the Aisin Gioro family in marriage. Once firmly in power, Nurhaci commanded all men in the areas he conquered to adopt the Manchu hairstyle.

The Manchu hairstyle signified all ethnic groups submission to Qing rule, and also aided the Manchu identification of those Han who refused to accept Qing dynasty domination.

The hairstyle was compulsory for all males and the penalty for non-compliance was execution for treason. After the fall of the Qing dynasty in 1912, the Chinese no longer had to wear the Manchu queue. While some, such as Zhang Xun, still did so as a tradition, most of them abandoned it after the last Emperor of China, Puyi, cut his queue in 1922.

The Nanais at first fought against the Nurhaci and the Manchus, led by their own Nanai Hurka chief Sosoku before surrendering to Hongtaiji in 1631. Mandatory shaving of the front of all male heads was imposed on Amur peoples like the Nanai people who were conquered by the Qing. The Amur peoples already wore the queue on the back of their heads but did not shave the front until the Qing subjected them and ordered them to shave. The term "shaved-head people" was used to describe the Nanai people by Ulch people.

=== Queue order ===
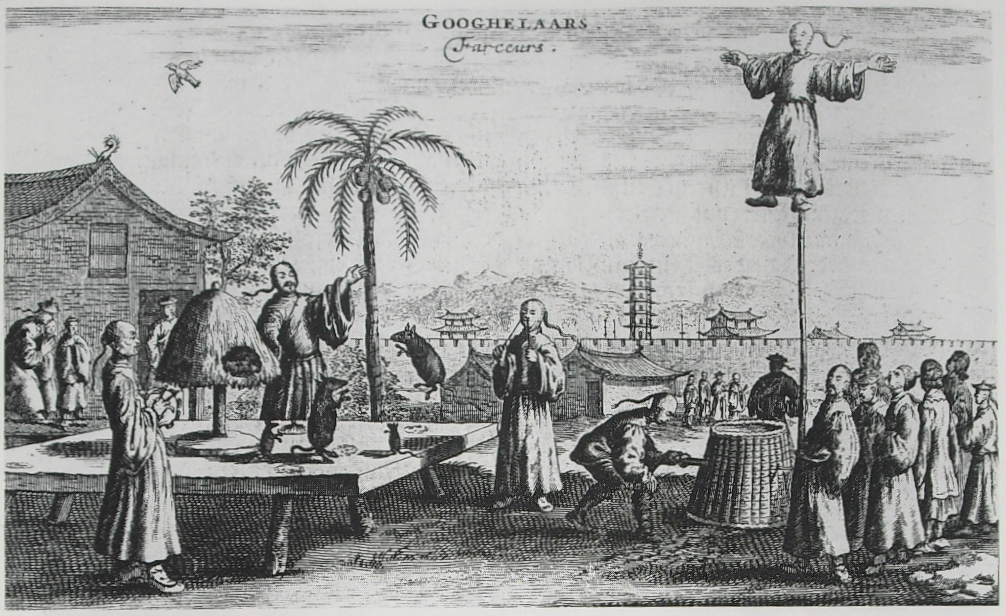
Chinese circus performers soon after the Manchu conquest, wearing queues. (Drawing by Johan Nieuhof, 1655–57)

The Queue Order (simplified Chinese: 剃发令; traditional Chinese: 剃髮令; pinyin: tìfàlìng), or tonsure decree, was a series of laws violently imposed by the Qing dynasty during the seventeenth century. It was also imposed on Taiwanese indigenous peoples in 1753, and Koreans who settled in northeast China in the late 19th century, though the Ryukyuan people of the Ryukyu Kingdom, a tributary of China, requested and were granted an exemption from the mandate.

Traditionally, adult Han Chinese did not cut their hair for philosophical and cultural reasons. According to the Classic of Filial Piety, Confucius said:

We are given our body, skin and hair from our parents; which we ought not to damage. This idea is the quintessence of filial duty. (身體髮膚，受之父母，不敢毀傷，孝之始也。)

As a result of this ideology, both men and women wound their hair into a bun (a topknot) or other various hairstyles.

Han Chinese did not object to wearing the queue braid on the back of the head as they traditionally wore all their hair long, but fiercely objected to shaving the forehead so the Qing government exclusively focused on forcing people to shave the forehead rather than wear the braid. Han rebels in the first half of the Qing who objected to Qing hairstyle wore the braid but defied orders to shave the front of the head. One person was executed for refusing to shave the front but he had willingly braided the back of his hair. It was only later that westernized revolutionaries began to view the braid as backwards and advocated adopting short-haired western styles. Han rebels against the Qing like the Taiping retained their queue braids on the back but rebelled by growing hair on the front of their heads. This caused the Qing government to view shaving the front of the head as the primary sign of loyalty rather than wearing the braid on the back, which did not violate Han customs and traditional Han did not object to. Koxinga criticized the Qing hairstyle by referring to the shaven pate looking like a fly. Koxinga and his men objected to shaving when the Qing demanded they shave in exchange for recognizing Koxinga as a feudatory. The Qing demanded that Zheng Jing and his men on Taiwan shave to receive recognition as a fiefdom. His men and Ming prince Zhu Shugui fiercely objected to shaving.

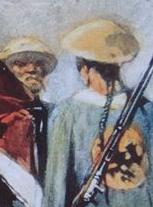
A soldier during the Boxer Rebellion with queue and conical Asian hat

In 1644, Beijing was sacked by a coalition of rebel forces led by Li Zicheng, a minor Ming dynasty official turned leader of a peasant revolt. The Chongzhen Emperor committed suicide when the city fell, marking the official end of the Ming dynasty. The Han Chinese Ming general Wu Sangui and his army then defected to the Qing and allowed them through Shanhai pass. They then seized control of Beijing, overthrowing Li's short-lived Shun dynasty. They then forced Han Chinese to adopt the queue as a sign of submission.

A year later, after the Qing armies reached South China, on 21 July 1645, the regent Dorgon issued an edict ordering all Han men to shave their foreheads and braid the rest of their hair into a queue identical to those worn by the Manchus. Qing Manchu prince Dorgon initially canceled the order for all men in Ming territories south of the Great wall (post 1644 additions to the Qing) to shave. It was a Han official from Shandong, Sun Zhixie and Li Ruolin who voluntarily shaved their foreheads and demanded Qing Prince Dorgon impose the queue hairstyle on the entire population which led to the queue order. The Han Chinese were given 10 days to comply or face death. Though Dorgon admitted that followers of Confucianism might have grounds for objection, most Han officials cited the Ming dynasty's traditional System of Rites and Music as their reason for resistance. This led Dorgon to question their motives: "If officials say that people should not respect our Rites and Music, but rather follow those of the Ming, what can be their true intentions?"

In the edict, Dorgon specifically emphasized the fact that Manchus and the Qing Emperor himself all wore the queue and shaved their foreheads, so that by following the queue order, Han Chinese would look like the Manchus and the Emperor. This invoked the Confucian notion that the people were like the sons of the emperor, and should be similar in their appearance.

The slogan adopted by the Qing was "Cut the hair and keep the head, (or) keep the hair and cut the head" (Chinese: 留髮不留頭，留頭不留髮; pinyin: liú fà bù liú tóu, liú tóu bù liú fà). People who resisted the order were met with deadly force. Han rebels in Shandong tortured the Qing official who suggested the queue order to Dorgon to death and killed his relatives.

The imposition of this order was not uniform; it took up to 10 years of martial enforcement for all of China to be brought into compliance, and while it was the Qing who imposed the queue hairstyle on the general population, they did not always personally execute those who did not obey. It was Han Chinese defectors who carried out massacres against people refusing to wear the queue. Li Chengdong, a Han Chinese general who had served the Ming but defected to the Qing, ordered troops to carry out three separate massacres in the city of Jiading within a month, resulting in tens of thousands of deaths. The third massacre left few survivors. The three massacres at Jiading District are some of the most infamous, with estimated death tolls in the tens or even hundreds of thousands. Jiangyin also held out against about 10,000 Qing troops for 83 days. When the city wall was finally breached on 9 October 1645, the Qing army, led by the Han Chinese Ming defector Liu Liangzuo (劉良佐), who had been ordered to "fill the city with corpses before you sheathe your swords," massacred the entire population, killing between 74,000 and 100,000 people.

Han Chinese soldiers in 1645 under Han General Hong Chengchou forced the queue on the people of Jiangnan, while Han people were initially paid silver to wear the queue in Fuzhou when it was first implemented.

The queue was the only aspect of Manchu culture that the Qing forced on the common Han population. The Qing required people serving as officials to wear Manchu clothing, but allowed other Han civilians to continue wearing Hanfu (Han clothing). Nevertheless, most Han civilian men voluntarily adopted Manchu clothing like Changshan of their own free will. Throughout the Qing dynasty Han women continued to wear Han clothing.

However, the shaving policy was not enforced in the Tusi autonomous chiefdoms in Southwestern China where many minorities lived. There was one Han Chinese Tusi, the Chiefdom of Kokang populated by Han Kokang people.

The Qing dynasty required all subjects of all ethnicities to shave their foreheads and wear the queue braid including Muslims like Hui people and Salar people but some Turkic Muslim ethnicities like Uyghur and Salar people already shaved their entire heads as part of their culture and were bald so they were not able to wear the braids on the back unless they wore wigs with fake queues. According to Jonathan Neaman Lipman the Qing dynasty required Salars to wear the queue. During the Qing Salar men shaved their hair bald while when they went to journey in public they put on artificial queues. Uyghur men shaved their hair bald during the Qing. Uyghur males at the present still shave their heads bald in the summer. Chen Cheng observed that Muslim Turks in 14th–15th century Turfan and Kumul shaved their heads while non-Muslim Turks grew long hair.

However, after Jahangir Khoja invaded Kashgar, Turkistani Muslim begs and officials in Xinjiang eagerly fought for the "privilege" of wearing a queue to show their steadfast loyalty to the Empire. High-ranking begs were granted this right.

The purpose of the Queue Order was to demonstrate loyalty to the Qing, and refusing to shave one's hair came to symbolize revolutionary ideals, as seen during the White Lotus Rebellion. Because of this, the members of the Taiping Rebellion were sometimes called the Long hairs (長毛) or Hair rebels (髮逆).

=== Resistance to the queue ===
Han Chinese resistance to adopting the queue was widespread and bloody. The Chinese in the Liaodong Peninsula rebelled in 1622 and 1625 in response to the implementation of the mandatory hairstyle. The Manchus responded swiftly by killing the educated elite and instituting a stricter separation between Han Chinese and Manchus.

In 1645, the enforcement of the queue order was taken a step further by the ruling Manchus when it was decreed that any man who did not adopt the Manchu hairstyle within ten days would be executed. The intellectual Lu Xun summed up the Chinese reaction to the implementation of the mandatory Manchu hairstyle by stating, "In fact, the Chinese people in those days revolted not because the country was on the verge of ruin, but because they had to wear queues." In 1683 Zheng Keshuang surrendered and wore a queue.

The queue became a symbol of the Qing dynasty and a custom except among Buddhist monastics. Some revolutionists, supporters of the Hundred Days' Reform or students who studied abroad cut their braids. The Xinhai Revolution in 1911 led to a complete change in hairstyle almost overnight. The queue became unpopular as it became associated with a fallen government; this is depicted in Lu Xun's short story Storm in a Teacup and is demonstrated by the fact that Chinese citizens in Hong Kong collectively changed to short haircuts.

Cantonese outlaw bandit pirates in the Guangdong maritime frontier with Vietnam in the 17th, 18th and 19th centuries wore their hair long in defiance of the Qing laws which mandated cutting.

Many people were violating the Qing laws on hair at the end of the dynasty. Some Chinese chose to wear the queue but not to shave their crown, while those people who cut the queue off and did not shave were considered revolutionary and others maintained the state-mandated combination of the queue and shaved crown.

=== Exemptions ===
Neither Taoist priests nor Buddhist monks were required to wear the queue by the Qing; they continued to wear their traditional hairstyles, completely shaved heads for Buddhist monks, and long hair in the traditional Chinese topknot for Taoist priests.

=== Foreign reaction ===
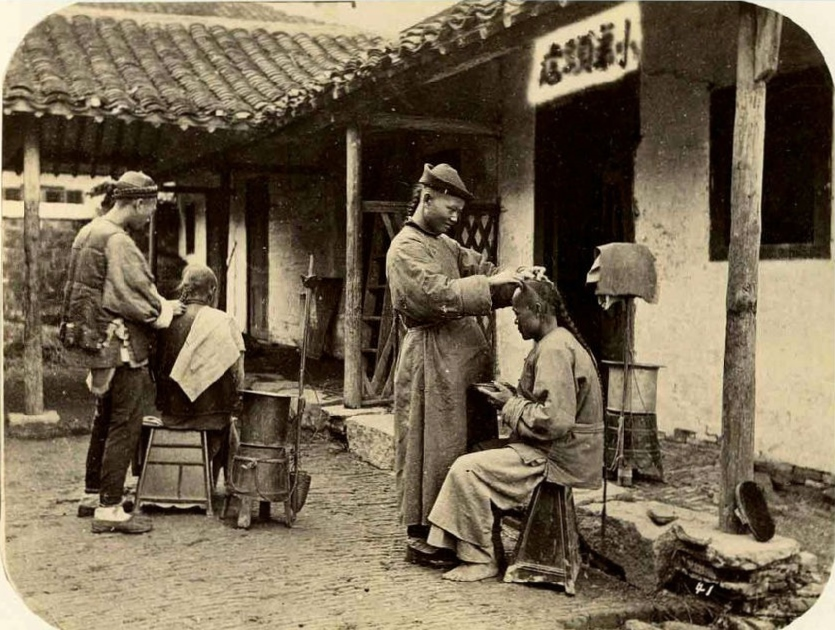
Barbershop in the Qing Dynasty (1870s)

The Manchus' willingness to impose the queue and their dress style on the men of China was viewed as an example to emulate by some foreign observers. H. E. M. James, a British civil servant in India, wrote in 1887 that the British ought to act in a similarly decisive way when imposing their will in India. In his view, the British administration should have outlawed practises such as Sati much earlier than 1829, which James ascribed to a British unwillingness to challenge long-held Indian traditions, no matter how detrimental they were to the country.

British author Demetrius Charles Boulger in 1899 proposed that Britain form and head an alliance of "Philo-Chinese Powers" in setting up a new government for China based in Shanghai and Nanking as two capitals along the River Yangtze, to counter the interests of other powers in the region like the Russians due to what he believed was the imminent collapse of the Qing dynasty. The Yangtze valley was controlled by Qing officials such as Liu Kunyi and Zhang Zhidong, who were not under Beijing's influence and whom Boulger believed Britain could work with to stabilize China. He proposed that at Nanjing and Hankou a force of Chinese soldiers trained by the British be deployed and in Hong Kong, Weihaiwei and the Yangtze valley and it would have no allegiance to the Qing, and as such they in his idea would forgo the queue and be made to grow their hair long as a symbolic measure to "increasing the confidence of the Chinese in the advent of a new era". Boulger stated he could not discern from the Chinese he spoke to on whether the queue was invented by Nurhaci to impose on the Chinese as a symbol of loyalty or whether it was an already established Manchu custom as no one seemed to know the origin of it from his or other sinologists' inquiries.

English adventurer Augustus Frederick Lindley wrote that the beardless, youthful long haired Han Chinese rebels from Hunan in the Taiping armies who grew all their hair long while fighting against the Qing dynasty were among the most beautiful men in the world unlike, in his mind, the Han Chinese who wore the queue, with Lindley calling the shaved part "a disfigurement".

=== Vietnam ===
After Nguyễn Huệ defeated the Later Lê dynasty, high ranking Lê loyalists and the last Lê emperor Lê Chiêu Thống fled Vietnam for asylum in Qing China. They went to Beijing where Lê Chiêu Thống was appointed a Chinese mandarin of the fourth rank in the Han Chinese Eight Banners, while lower ranking loyalists were sent to cultivate government land and join the Green Standard Army in Sichuan and Zhejiang. They adopted Qing clothing and adopt the queue hairstyle, effectively becoming naturalized subjects of the Qing dynasty affording them protection against Vietnamese demands for extradition. Some Lê loyalists were also sent to Central Asia in Urumqi. Modern descendants of the Lê monarch can be traced to southern Vietnam and Urumqi, Xinjiang.

== Other queues ==
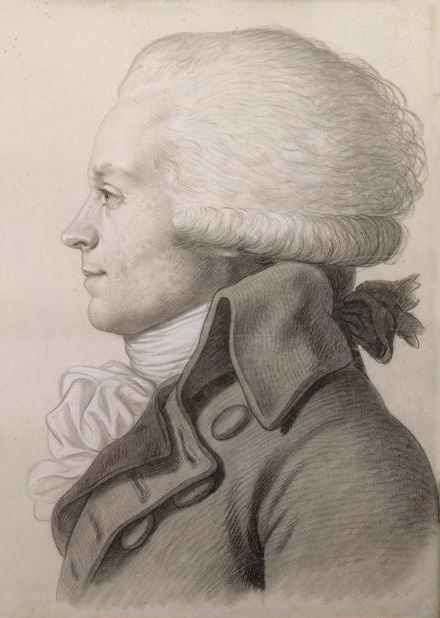
Maximilien Robespierre (1758–1794) wearing a powdered wig tied in a queue that was a common piece of men's dress by c. 1795.

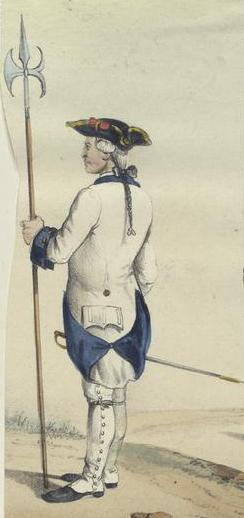
A Spanish soldier wearing a queue (1761)

In the 18th century, European soldiers styled their traditionally long hair into a queue called the "soldier's queue." The 18th century custom of tying long powdered curly wigs (which normally reached down the back and chest) behind the neck began at first among soldiers and hunters, as seen as early as 1678 in a depiction of King of France Louis XIV hunting with his long hair tied back. By the 1730s, the queue had spread from the military and became widespread also among civilians. A 1697 depiction of a royal guard during the wedding of the Louis, Duke of Burgundy shows the sporting of this hairstyle, which came to influence civilian fashions due to the frequent wars France engaged in during Louis' reign. The queue, worn with the wig either curled, known as a tyewig (a wig tied into a queue) or covered with a silk bag, known as a bag wig, gradually replaced the unwieldy big wigs. Wigs that did not feature a queue such as the bob wig were favoured by those who could not afford a long wig. The type of wig became an indicator of one's rank, occupation and political leanings.

Powdered wigs tied in a queue remained important to men's fashion until the change of dress in the 1790s which was affected, both by the French Revolution (1789–1799) and the Pitt's hair powder tax in 1795 in Britain although formal court dress of European monarchies still required a powdered wig or long powdered hair tied in a queue until the accession of Napoleon Bonaparte to the throne as emperor in 1804.

The first western army in which the wearing of a queue by its soldiers was forbidden was the Russian army in the 1780s, before the outbreak of the French Revolution in 1789. Grigory Potemkin, a Russian statesman and favourite of Catherine the Great, abhorred the tight uniforms and uncomfortable powdered wigs tied in a queue worn by soldiers of the Russian Army and instigated a complete revision of both. Along with comfortable, practical, well-fitting uniforms, his reforms introduced short, natural hairstyles for all, without wigs and long powdered hair tied in a queue.

Soldiers of all other western armies adopted the wearing of short hairstyle without a queue only after the outbreak of the French Revolution during the French Revolutionary Wars and Napoleonic Wars (1792–1815).

The French army plaited their wigs into a short queue (the French word for "tail") tied with a ribbon in the back, while the British military used the Ramillies wig, which featured a very long queue tied with two black ribbons, one at the neck and one at the tail end. The French army continued keeping queues until the French Consulate period (1799-1804), when Napoleon Bonaparte and other officers promoted close cropped hair, known as à la Titus. Napoleon himself, initially wearing long hair tied in a queue, changed his hairstyle and cut his hair short while in Egypt in 1798. However, hair policy in the French army was not uniform; some regiments such as the Imperial Guard foot grenadiers stuck to queues long afterwards, while the 2nd Line Infantry kept their queues as late as 1812. Short hair only became mandated at the end of the First Empire with the ordinance of 25 September 1815. Marshal Jean Lannes notably stood out due to his refusal to cut his queue.

British soldiers and sailors during the 18th century also wore their hair in a queue. While not always braided, the hair was pulled back very tight into a single tail, wrapped around a piece of leather and tied down with a ribbon. The hair was often greased and powdered in a fashion similar to powdered wigs, or tarred in the case of sailors. It was said that the soldiers' hair was pulled back so tightly that they had difficulty closing their eyes afterwards. The use of white hair powder in the British Army was discontinued in 1796 and queues were ordered to be cut off four years later. They continued to be worn in the Royal Navy for a while longer, where they were known as "pigtails". Officers wore pigtails until 1805 and other ranks continued to wear them until about 1820.

In the Prussian Army and those of several other states within the Holy Roman Empire, the wearing of soldier's queue was mandatory under the reign of Frederick William I of Prussia. An artificial or "patent" queue was issued to recruits whose hair was too short to plait. The style was abolished in the Prussian Army by reforms of Gerhard von Scharnhorst in 1807.

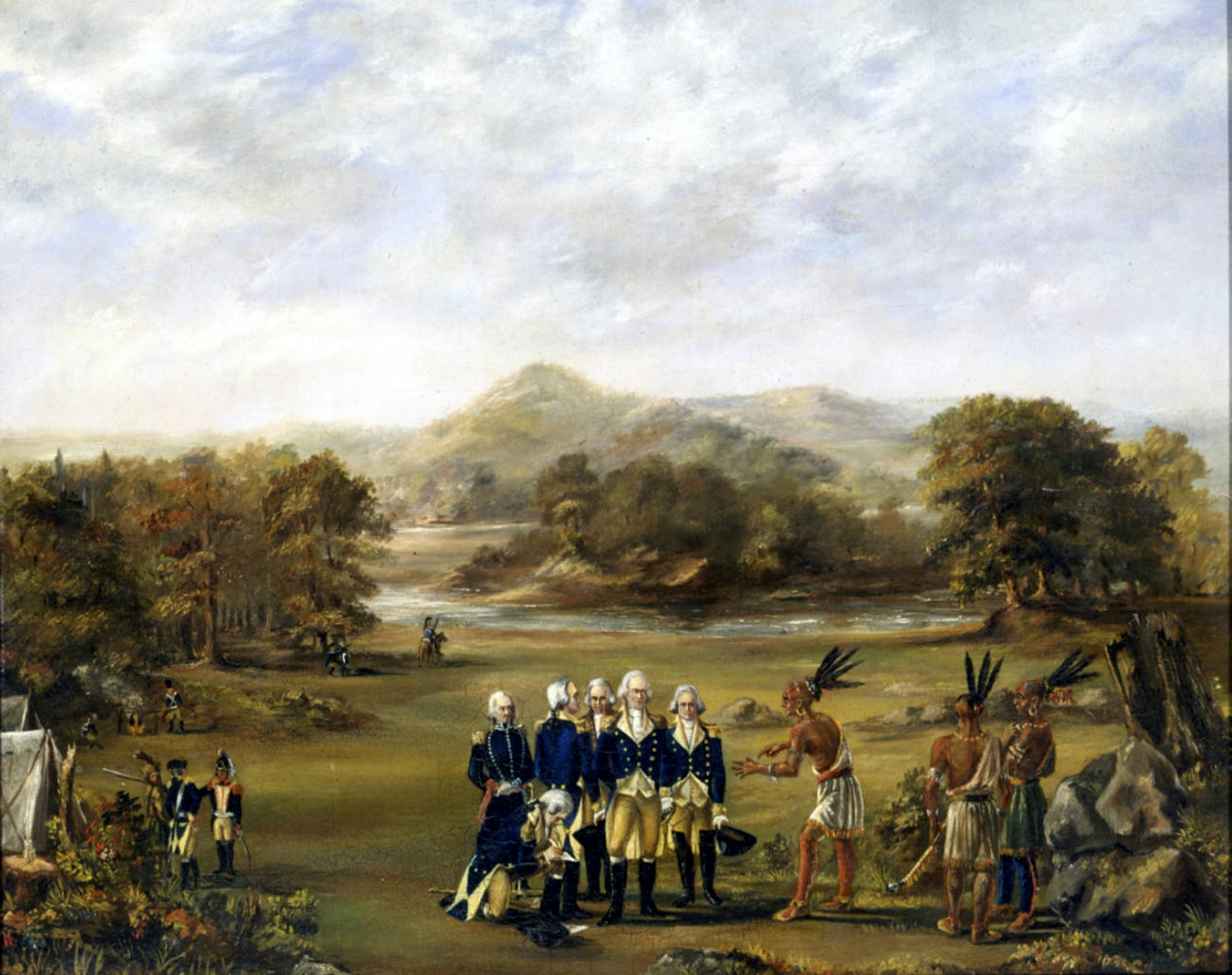
United States Army officers (future U.S.President William Henry Harrison among them) wearing powdered wigs tied in a queue during the Treaty of Greenville negotiations in 1795

In the United States Army, queues or pigtails had been worn since the Revolutionary War (1775–1783) until 1801. The order to remove all queues was issued on 30 April 1801 by Major General James Wilkinson. The order was highly unpopular with both officers and men, leading to several desertions and threats of resignation. One senior officer, Lieutenant Colonel Thomas Butler, was eventually court-martialled in 1803 for failing to cut his hair. In 1817 during a period known as the Era of Good Feelings, president James Monroe (1758–1831), the last U.S. president who was a Revolutionary War veteran, went on a country-wide Great Goodwill Tour. On the tour he donned a Revolutionary War officer's uniform and tied his long, powdered hair in a queue according to the old-fashioned style of the 18th century.

== See also ==
- Beard and haircut laws by country
- Braid (hairstyle)
- Cheongsam
- Chupryna
- Foot binding
- Hanfu
- List of hairstyles
- Mohawk
- Pigtail
- Pigtail Ordinance
- Rattail (haircut)
- Sikha
- Tonsure
