= East–West cultural debate =

Historical Chinese debate on West vs East

- Traditional Chinese: 東西文化論戰
- Simplified Chinese: 东西文化论战
Transcriptions
Standard Mandarin
- Hanyu Pinyin: Dōngxī wénhuà lùnzhàn

The East–West cultural debate is a debate on the similarities and differences, the strengths and weaknesses, and the trade-offs between Eastern culture and Western culture during the mainland period of the Republic of China. This debate began with the founding of the New Youth magazine in 1915 and ended before the Northern Expedition in 1927. During this period, hundreds of people participated in the debate with over a thousand articles, focusing on Chinese culture and Chinese society.

In 1915, New Youth magazine compared Eastern and Western cultures and criticized Chinese culture with articles such as "Admonishment to Youth", "French and Modern Civilization", and "Differences in the Fundamental Ideology of Eastern and Western Nationalities". Later, the Oriental Magazine compared Eastern and Western cultures, defending traditional Chinese culture. In 1918, Chen Duxiu sent out a series of articles questioning the journalists of the Oriental Magazine, while Du Yaquan responded to the questions in Oriental Magazine. Subsequently, the content and scale of the debate continued to expand, with almost all important scholars at the time participating. Hu Shih, Chen Duxiu, and other Westernized schools criticized and completely rejected Chinese culture. Liang Shuming, Du Yaquan, Zhang Shizhao, and others defended Chinese culture and believed that it was necessary to reconcile Chinese and Western cultures. In 1919, the Paris Peace Conference agreed to transfer Germany's rights and interests in Shandong Problem to Japan, which triggered the May Fourth Movement and the disappointment of Chinese intellectuals with the West. At this time, Zhang Shizhao, Chen Jiayi, and others actively promoted the harmony between Chinese and Western cultures, causing criticism from those who supported Westernization. At this point, the focus of the debate shifted from the previous comparison of the strengths and weaknesses of Eastern and Western cultures, as well as the similarities and differences between Eastern and Western civilizations, to the question of whether Eastern and Western cultures can be reconciled. Chen Duxiu, Li Dazhao, Cai Yuanpei, Zhang Dongsun, Chen Jiayi, Zhang Shizhao, Jiang Menglin, Chang Naide, and others participated in the debate. Since 1921, works by Liang Qichao and others have transmitted the pessimistic sentiment in Europe after World War I back to China, leading to a reflection on Western civilization in the debate. Liang Shuming's "Eastern and Western Cultures and Their Philosophy" and Liang Qichao's "Record of European Journey" immediately became the focus of discussion, and the practical approach of combining Eastern and Western cultures became the main focus of attention.

The East–West cultural debate provides different interpretations and definitions of the meaning, old and new, advantages, and disadvantages of Chinese culture. Wang Yuanhua believes that the debate between Chen Duxiu and Du Yaquan on Eastern and Western cultures opened up a "pioneer in cultural research" in China. During the debate, socialist ideology was widely spread and recognized in China, and people like Chen Duxiu and Li Dazhao switched from supporting Western culture to supporting China on the path of socialism.

This debate did not come to a conclusion, and in the 1930s, there was a resurgence of the debate between the standard culture and overall Westernization. In 1962, young students such as Li Ao launched a cultural debate between China and the West with the opponents of Hu Shi's views from mainland China in Taiwan. A similar controversy in the 1980s in mainland China was thought by Wang Yuanhua to be still repeating the East–West cultural controversy before and after the May 4th Movement. After 2010, scholars in mainland China debated the "subjectivity of Chinese culture".

== Background ==
=== Learning Western civilization ===
Since the 16th century, Western learning has spread eastward, sparking a dispute between the East and West. During the Ming Dynasty, Xu Guangqi believed that "it is advantageous for the country, regardless of distance" and pointed out that "in order to surpass the West in science and technology, we must first understand it". Mei Wending, Li Zhizao, Fang Yizhi, and others also held similar positions, thus engaging in discussions with Western missionaries. However, most scholar-official regarded Western culture as a "foreign strategy" based on Confucian values and norms, rejecting the introduction of Western culture. For example, Yang Guangxian once said, "It is better to have no good calendar in China than to have Westerners in China. The Qing Dynasty banned Christianity and closed its doors in order to prevent the introduction of Western culture. Since the failure of the First Opium War in 1840, Lin Zexu and Wei Yuan, among others, proposed the ideas of "the more you change the past, the more you facilitate the people" and "learn from the barbarians to control the barbarians", which were the first traditional Chinese intellectuals to transform Western culture into Chinese tradition.

China's response to Western world has gone through three stages: firstly, intellectuals believed that they should learn Western artifacts, and then they realized that they should also learn Western systems and laws. Around the May Fourth Movement, intellectuals realized that they should also learn the ideas that make up the West. After the First Opium War, Lin Zexu, Wei Yuan, and others put forward the ideas of "the more ancient changes, the more convenient for the people" and "to learn the long techniques of the barbarians to control the barbarians". The Westernization Movement of the Qing Dynasty launched the Self-Strengthening Movement in order to learn from Western military equipment. Li Hongzhang said that "everything in the Chinese civil and military system is far above the West, and firearms alone cannot reach", Zhang Zhidong also said, "Chinese academia is refined, with principles, teachings, and great methods of governing the world, all of which are complete. But, it is sufficient for me to learn from the strengths made by Westerners." However, as for Kang Youwei and Liang Qichao's Hundred Days' Reform, more people turned to pursue Western democratic politics. At the same time, Yan Fu further pointed out the backwardness of Chinese ideology, believing that the lifeblood of modern Western culture lies in "academic rejection of falsehood and reverence of truth, and in criminal and political justice, bending the private to consider public" rather than "steam engines and weapons" and "heavenly calculation and refinement", and advocating "inspiring people's strength, opening up people's wisdom, and renewing morality". Yan Fu's ideas influenced later generations. For example, Sun Yat-sen, who had met with Yan Fu, believed that national education was the fundamental way to consolidate the republic.

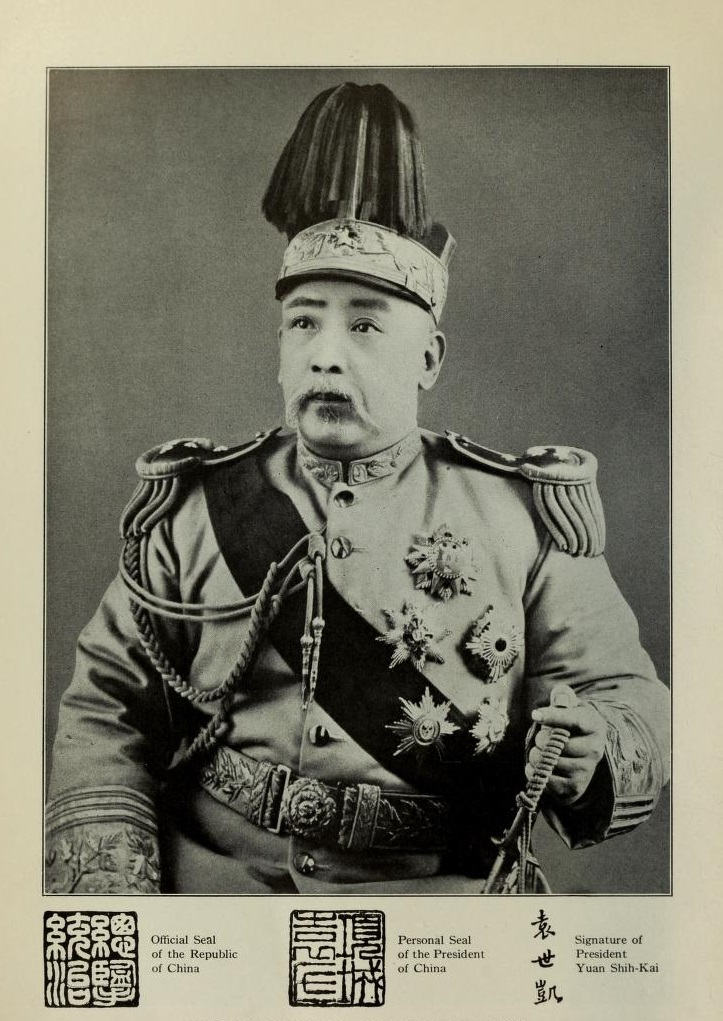
Yuan Shikai, the leader of the Northern Warlords who restored the monarchy during the presidency of the Republic of China

=== Revitalizing traditional culture ===
Since the late 19th century, the trend of opposing old learning with new learning and opposing middle school with Western learning has caused traditional Chinese culture to lose its status in people's minds. In the earliest days, those who opposed learning from the West tended to have a shallow understanding of the cultural traditions of the East and the West, so their voices were weak. But around the May Fourth Movement, a group of scholars based on the study of Chinese and Western studies raised their voices against this. By the early 20th century, the trend of using national culture to inspire national confidence gradually emerged, advocating for the revival and preservation of Chinese culture to become one of the main issues of social concern. For example, "The Soul of the Nation" published in Zhejiang Tide had the following words: "Today, it is easier for China to know its own disease than to know its own loveliness." Advocating the revival of traditional culture, it is no longer the traditional scholars. However, new intellectuals, mainly from the group of international students, such as Liang Shuming, who had multiple debates with Hu Shih and supported the revival of traditional culture, studied Seohak from a young age, while Hu Shih, who opposed Liang Shuming and supported Westernization, was actually the first to receive private school education from a young age. In addition, active supporters of learning from the West, such as Kang Youwei and Gu Hongming, or scholars with complete Western educational backgrounds, have instead become defenders of traditional Chinese culture.

At the end of the Qing Dynasty and the beginning of the Republic of China, the relationship between Eastern and Western cultures was reflected upon, and the extreme Westernization ideology of "being obsessed with Europeanization" and the claim that the Chinese race was inferior to the West was criticized by various circles. The trend of national quintessence and the school of national quintessence have also begun to rise, and the core of traditional culture, Confucianism, has been re-examined – supporters of Confucianism believe that Confucius' true theory has been lost and should be rediscovered and developed. Although traditional customs and beliefs gradually declined with the collapse of imperial power after the Xinhai Revolution, the voice of respecting the restoration of Confucianism remained constant. Kang Youwei, a proponent of Confucianism, criticized "the decline of education since the Republic, and the sweeping of discipline." Supporters believed that "China's new destiny must depend on Confucianism and China cannot be saved without restoration." As the president of the Republic, Yuan Shikai frequently issued orders to respect Confucius, and various organizations were established all over China.

The 1911 Revolution overthrew the rule of the Qing Dynasty and established a republican regime, but the achievements of the revolution soon fell into the hands of warlords such as Yuan Shikai. Democratic republican systems such as parliament, cabinet, and constitution became tools for warlords and politicians to compete for power and profit, which made Chinese intellectuals disappointed. The rise of restoration thinking and the restoration movement led scholars of that time to reflect on the crux of the country's inability to become prosperous and strong, and ideological and cultural values were considered by many scholars to be the crux. For example, the publication of the "Daily Mail" pointed out that the Revolution had been successful in form, but its essence had not yet been successful. Du Yaquan believes that in order for China to change its accumulated drawbacks, it should "change social psychology and shift social habits". In 1915, Chen Duxiu and others founded New Youth magazine, which compared old ideas, concepts, morals, and culture with new ideas, new concepts, new morals, and new culture. During this period, there was a debate between Eastern and Western cultures.

== Cultural differences ==
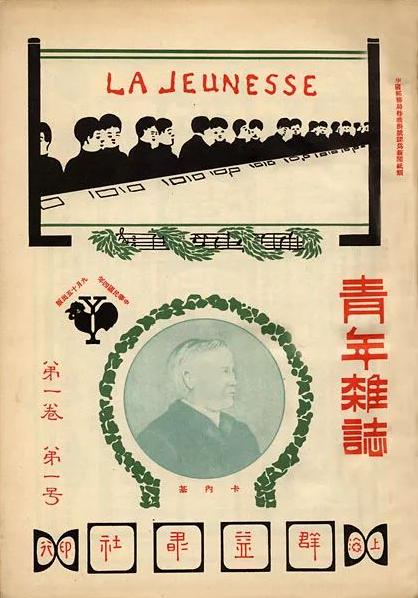
The second volume of the Youth Magazine (picture), which triggered the debate between East and West cultures, was renamed New Youth

=== East–West cultural view of New Youth Magazine ===
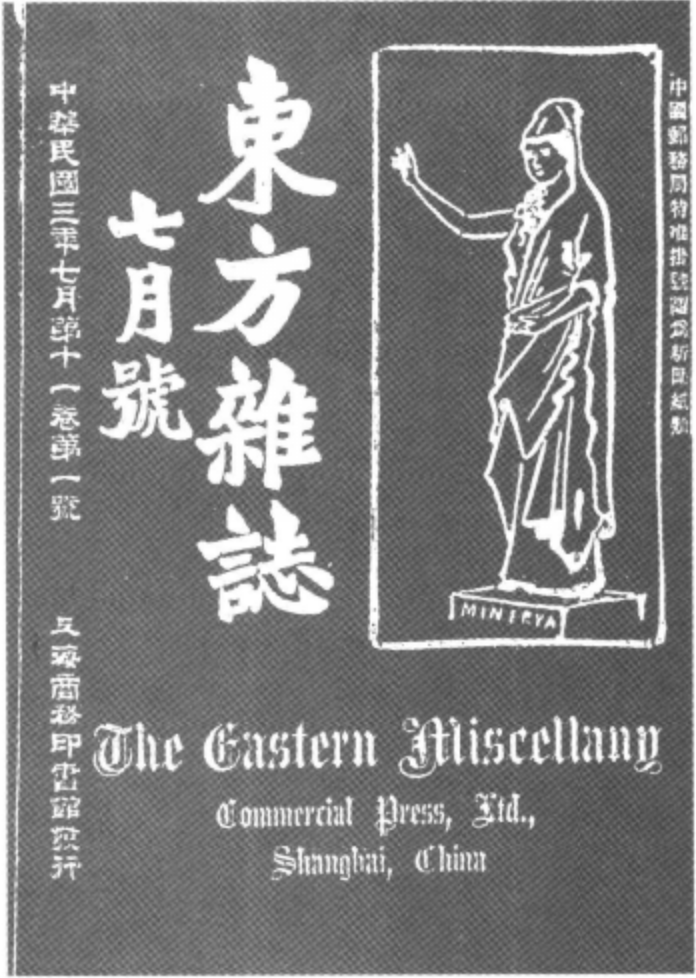
Oriental Magazine (picture), which confronts with the views of New Youth

In 1915, the New Youth magazine was founded, and Chen Duxiu compared Eastern and Western cultures with articles such as "Admonitions to Youth", "French and Modern Civilization", and "Differences in the Fundamental Ideology of Eastern and Western Nationalities" in the first issue, marking the beginning of the New Culture Movement. In "Admonitions to Youth", Chen Duxiu believes that the differences between Eastern and Western cultures are "slavery" and "autonomy", "conservatism" and "progress", "retreat" and "progress", "seclusion" and "the world", "imaginary literature" and "practicality", "imagination" and "science". He regards human rights and science as the pillars of modern Western civilization and actively advocates for the Westernization of Chinese culture. In "The Differences in the Fundamental Ideology of Eastern and Western Nationalities", Chen Duxiu further summarized the cultural differences between the East and the West as the differences between the "individual" and "family" standards, the "rule of law" and "emotional" standards, the "practical" and "imaginary literature" standards. He advocated for the removal of the national identity of the "inferior Eastern ethnic groups who love peace and tranquility, grace and elegance" from China, and advocated for "individualism, instead of familyism". Chen Duxiu believed that the Three Fundamental Bonds and Five Constant Virtues of Confucianism and the freedom and equality of the West are the watersheds between Eastern and Western civilizations and that the Three Fundamental Bonds and Five Constant Virtues are incompatible with modern republican politics. In "The French and Modern Civilization", Chen Duxiu also described Eastern and Western civilizations as the difference between ancient and modern civilizations, believing that Chinese culture must achieve Westernization.

=== Response from Oriental Magazine ===
Du Yaquan, the editor-in-chief of Oriental Magazine, published a series of articles under the pen name "Lungfu" (Note: According to the "Remembrance of Mr. Du Yaquan" in the "30th Anniversary Issue" of Oriental Magazine, Du Yaquan often uses the pen name "Lun Fu" with the signature "Gao Lao" in between) to compare the differences between Eastern and Western cultures and refute Chen Duxiu and others. Du Yaquan's article "Quiet Civilization and Moving Civilization" argues that the differences between Eastern and Western cultures are not differences between ancient and modern civilizations, but rather differences in nature. These differences are products of historical and social evolution, and are summarized in terms of "Quiet Civilization" and "Moving Civilization" to summarize Chinese and Western civilizations:

To sum up, Western society is a dynamic society, and our society is a static society. From a dynamic society, a dynamic civilization occurs, and from a static society, a static civilization occurs. Each of the two civilizations has its own special scenery and colors, that is, the moving civilization has the scenery of the city with complex colors, while the quiet civilization has the scenery of the field with quiet colors.

In 1916, Du Yaquan's "Quiet Civilization and Moving Civilization" believed that the West values humans while China values nature, the West is extroverted while China is introverted, the West values competition while China values peace, and regarded Chinese civilization as a static civilization and Western civilization as a moving civilization. The two should complement each other's strengths and weaknesses, which is the beginning of the theory of cultural harmony between China and the West.

At the turn of spring and summer in 1918, the Oriental Magazine edited by Du Yaquan published three articles: Qian Zhixiu's Utilitarianism and Learning, Du Yaquan's The Confused Modern Mind, and Ping Yi's Translation of Judgement of Chinese and Western Civilizations. The book "The Confused Modern Mind" believes that the large-scale import of Western culture has led to the loss of China and the bankruptcy of the spiritual world. Therefore, Confucianism should be used to integrate the parts of Western culture that are beneficial to China, in order to promote Chinese culture. Utilitarianism and Learning, argues that utilitarianism is the greatest influence of Western culture on China, and utilitarianism is also the greatest harm to Chinese culture and learning. Judgment of Chinese and Western Civilizations introduces the comments of Western scholars such as Taili Uli on Gu Hongming's German works "The Spirit of Chinese Citizens and the Blood Road of War" and "China's Defense of European Thought". Gu Hongming's two works concluded that Chinese civilization represented by Confucius' ethics was superior to Western material civilization, and Taili Uli agreed with Gu Hongming's view.

=== Chen Duxiu and Du Yaquan Debate ===
In September 1918, Chen Duxiu published "Questioning the Journalists of the Oriental Magazine" in New Youth, with the subtitle "Oriental Magazine and Restoration Issues", in which Chen Duxiu questioned Qian Zhixiu's "Utilitarianism and Learning ", Du Yaquan's "Confused Modern People's Mind", and Gu Hongming's "Judgement of Chinese and Western Civilizations". Among them, Chen Duxiu questioned Du Yaquan: Did China's academic culture prosper during the Han, Wei, Tang, and Song dynasties, which were unified by Confucianism, or during the late Zhou dynasty before the unification of Confucianism? Christianity has unified Europe for thousands of years, and as for the Renaissance, European civilization was chaotic and contradictory. However, how does China compare to Middle Ages Europe? Is China's spiritual civilization the Confucian principles of monarchy, courtiers, ethics, and principles? Is there no other civilization besides this?

In December 1918, Du Yaquan published "Answer to the Question of the Journalist of the New Youth" in response to Chen Duxiu's questions. Du Yaquan argued that "the inherent civilization based on the principles of monarchy, Taoism, ministers, ethics and principles, and the integration with the reality of the national system, is to unify all things of civilization." Du Yaquan also echoed Gu Hongming's view, and also defended the article "utilitarianism and Learning". In February 1919, Chen Duxiu published "Re questioning the Journalists of Oriental Magazine", continuing to criticize the theory of "unification". Chen Duxiu believes that the theory of integration is harmful to the evolution of civilization and hinders the free development of academia and that innovation is the correct way for academic development to flourish. Chen Duxiu also pointed out that China's inherent civilization belongs to "ancient civilization" and therefore "cannot dominate modern society". The debate between the two sides revolves around integration and comparative culture.

Li Dazhao, Hu Shih, Chang Yansheng, Lu Xun, Zhou Zuoren, and Mao Zishui successively published articles in New Youth or other newspapers, either attacking traditional culture, advocating learning from the West, or comparing Chinese and Western cultures, believing that Chinese culture is relatively backward. Afterward, more and more people participated in the debate, involving more and more issues, until Du Yaquan was forced to resign from his position as editor-in-chief due to a controversy in 1920 and could not rest.

== After the May Fourth Movement ==
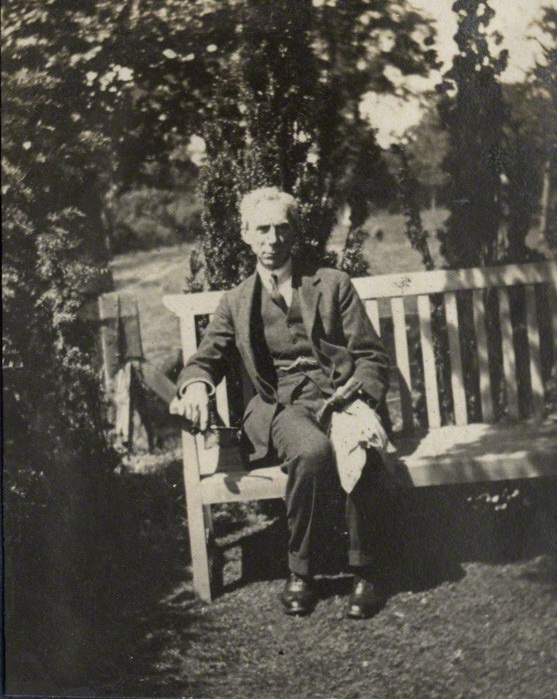
Russell (picture), a British philosopher, visited China in 1920 to publicize his theory of social transformation. After returning to Britain, he wrote The Chinese Problem, reflecting on modernity, and praising the Chinese outlook on life and Chinese civilization.

=== Disappointment with the West ===
The transfer of Germany's rights and interests in China to Japan at the Paris Peace Conference in May 1919 sparked anger among Chinese intellectuals leaning towards Western democracy. Students in Beijing took to the streets to protest against the authorities' traitorous behavior and Japan's aggression. Subsequently, strikes and marches began throughout China in May and June. From 1915 to 1919, the New Youth magazine was committed to transforming China's culture and morality, neglecting political participation. In 1919, there was a demand for immediate action to resolve China's crisis. The younger generation was no longer as interested in Western ideology, as Russell pointed out in his speech during his visit to China in 1920:

Among young people, a fervent desire to acquire Western knowledge is intertwined with the current reality of Western evil. They hope to acquire scientific knowledge rather than mechanical common sense and to achieve industrialization rather than capitalism. As individuals, they are socialists, just as most of the best members among them are Chinese teachers.

=== The rise of Cultural Reconciliation theory ===
==== The emergence of Reconciliation Theory ====
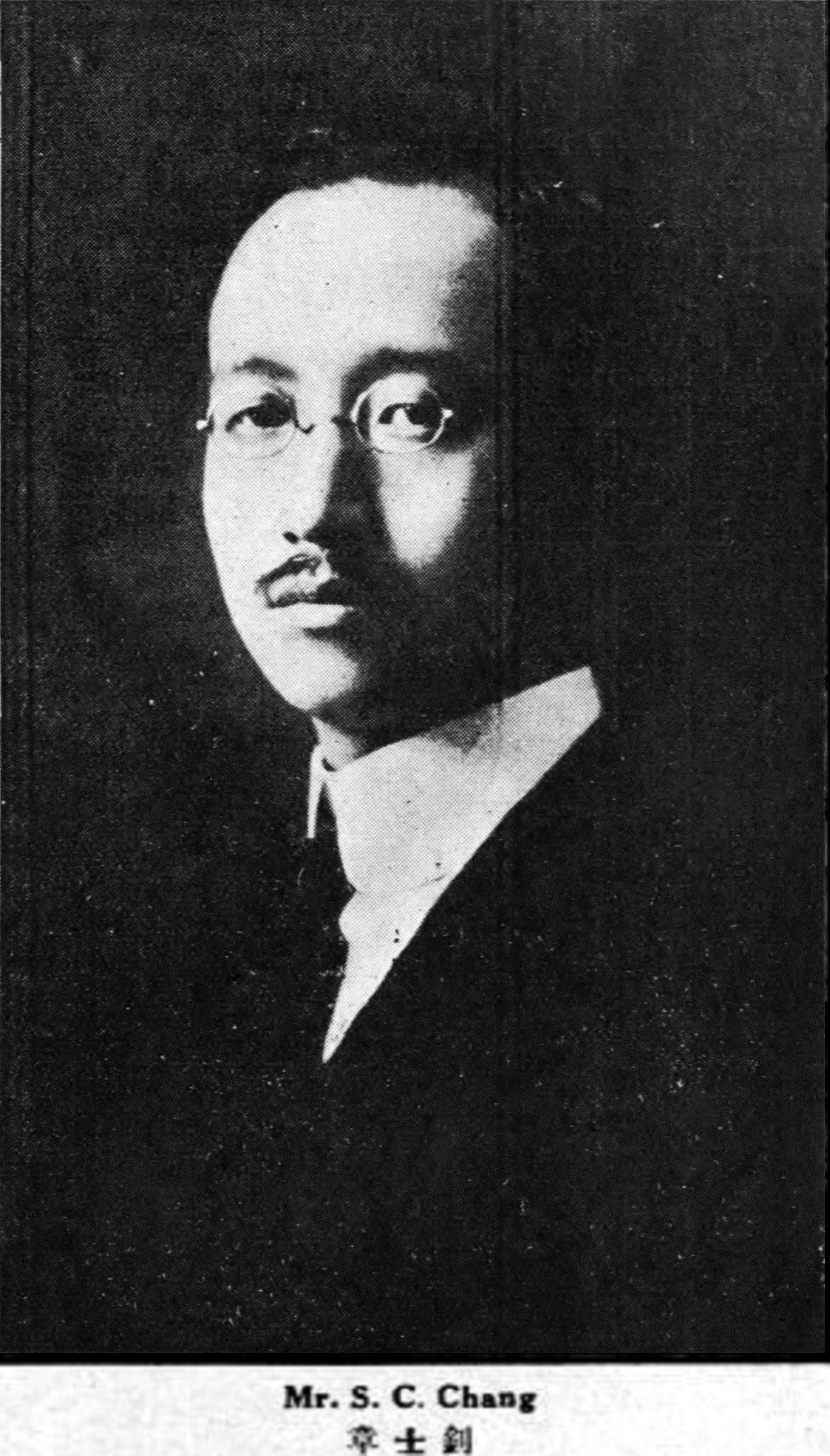
Zhang Shizhao, who advocated for harmony between Chinese and Western cultures.

As early as 1916, Du Yaquan had put forward the idea of reconciling Chinese and Western cultures. With the May Fourth Movement impacting China's old culture, the relationship between the new and old cultures caused controversy. Faced with the opposition to traditional culture, Zhang Shizhao advocated for cultural reconciliation in various parts of China, stating that "reconciliation is the essence of sociobiology evolution", "without the old, there can never be the new", and "if you are not good at preserving the old, you can never welcome the new". Chen Jiayi and others further proposed that China's inherent civilization should not be abolished and that Westernization should be "integrated into our inherent civilization". Zhang Shizhao and Chen Jiayi believe that the good parts of China's inherent civilization should be carried forward, and the material civilization of the West can also be absorbed. They describe Europeanization as "broken paper" and national heritage as "broken cloth". For Chinese people, rather than "copying Europeanization", it is better to "organize national heritage", which is actually more contributing to world civilization.

==== Criticism and response ====
New Youth, Xinchao, Min Feng, and Weekly Review refute such views. The counter-argument believes that Eastern and Western civilizations are civilizations of different periods, and the two cannot be reconciled, or there may be the coexistence of old and new, but this is not a reconciliation. The counter-argument also pointed out that China's inherent civilization is not considered a complete spiritual civilization, and "national heritage" cannot represent Chinese civilization, while Western civilization is developed in both material and spiritual aspects, so there is only one path to Westernization.

On October 1, 1919, Zhang Dongsun refuted the theory of reconciliation proposed by Zhang Shizhao in his speech at the Chinese Student Union of Huanqiu in September of that year, using "Mutation and Latent Change" in the "Current Affairs News". He believed that biological changes were divided into mutation and latent change, with the former being the representation and the latter being the beginning of the cause of change, and the theory of reconciliation was nonsense. On the 10th of that month, Zhang Shizhao published an article titled "New Trends and Reconciliation" in the "News Daily", in which he believed that all things are "a mixture of old and new". Sun Dongsun, on the 12th, published "Reply to Zhang Xing Yan" in the "Current Affairs News", pointing out that what Zhang Shizhao said "a mixture of the old and the new" was actually "the old and the new co-existing", and that the new will increase and the old will decrease, rather than "reconciling".

Chen Duxiu criticized the theory of reconciliation as "the evil virtue of human inertia" and stated in "Reconciliation Theory and Old Morality": "For example, if you buy and sell goods, and you bargain for ten yuan, and you bargain for three yuan, the final result is five yuan. If the bargain is five dollars, the final result is only two yuan and fifty jiao. So is the inertia in society." Li Dazhao published "Material Changes and Moral Changes" in "Xinchao", in which he argued that economic changes cause moral changes, and those material things can be restored, while morality cannot be restored. Therefore, Zhang Shizhao's proposition of "material innovation, moral restoration" is not feasible.

==== The struggle between thought and attitude ====
In October 1919, Jiang Menglin published an article titled "New and Old and Reconciliation", criticizing the viewpoint of reconciliation theory, which sparked a debate on "what is new thought". Jiang Menglin believes that new ideas are an attitude that goes toward the direction of evolution. Those who hold this attitude view our country's past life as dissatisfied, and our past thoughts cannot be fully enjoyed in terms of knowledge. Du Yaquan responded to Jiang Menglin by publishing "What is New Thought" in "Oriental Magazine", stating that "attitude is not thought, thought is not attitude", and feeling dissatisfied and unhappy with life and knowledge is a kind of emotion. He advocated that breaking down old habits, old lives, and old ideas is a will, not a thought. Du Yaquan also added in the note to the article: "To take feelings and will as the driving force of thought, to change feelings and will first, and then to be able to have new thoughts, is to make human reason a slave to lust. First, we decide what I like and what I want, and then we reason with them to explain why we like and want to like. This is the root of Western modern civilization, which is also the root of the disease of Western modern civilization." Du Yaquan has also published several articles criticizing the pretext for declaring war in the First World War and citing Bismarck's answer to the Austrians, Do you want to ask the reason for the war? But I can find an answer within twelve hours, as an example of finding a reason for the current attitude. Jiang Menglin published another article in the "Current Affairs News" titled "What is New Thought", in which he believed that new ideas are moving towards the "direction of evolution", while old ideas are moving towards the "comfort zone of old culture", and the two cannot be reconciled. In February 1920, Oriental Magazine reprinted Jiang Menglin's "What is New Thought" and published Du Yaquan's comments.

=== The third new civilization ===
In the spring of 1919, when Li Dazhao began promoting Marxism and Bolsheviks, he was completely isolated in China with only a few student supporters. However, the transfer of Germany's rights and interests in China to Japan at the Paris Peace Conference in May 1919 sparked anger among Chinese intellectuals leaning towards Western democracy. Before the May Fourth Movement, Li Dazhao warned that "if Europe and the United States are unreasonable and want to sacrifice our nation, it is not too late for us to unite against them". During the May Fourth Movement, Li Dazhao became a student leader. After the first demonstration, students gathered at the Red Mansion of Peking University to discuss with Li Dazhao. After the May Fourth Movement, Li Dazhao, Qu Qiubai, and other former "Westernization groups" turned to support "Russification" and became the first group of Marxists in China.

Li Dazhao's article "Fundamental Differences between Eastern and Western Civilizations" pointed out that "from now on, the Eastern civilization has declined in stillness, while the Western civilization has been exhausted by material means. In order to save the world from the crisis, the rise of a third new civilization is not enough to cross this cliff"; Li Dazhao asserted that it should be the Russians who can create a new civilization, and his ideology shifted from supporting the reconciliation between China and the West to support Marxism.

Qu Qiubai, a member of the Chinese Communist Party, pointed out in his article "East Culture and the world revolution" that there is no difference between East and West in culture. The so-called cultural difference between East and West is just the difference between advanced industrial-producing countries and backward handicraft-producing countries. The social revolution theory replaces the debate on East and West culture.

== Postwar ideological trends ==
=== Postwar thought and reflection ===
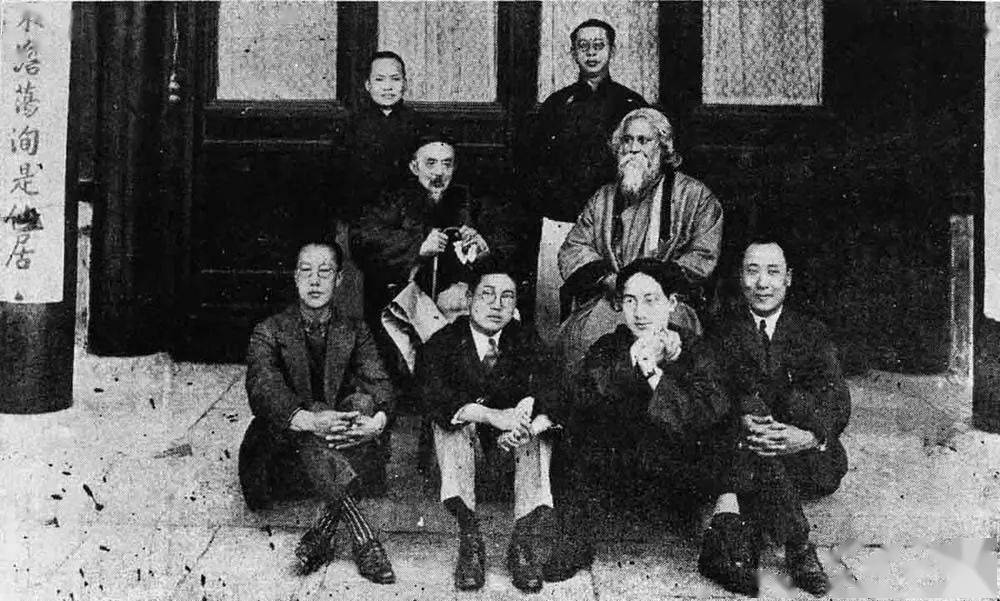
In 1924, Tagore, an Indian poet who advocated the revival of Eastern culture, visited China, which caused different levels of support and opposition from the eastern and western cultural debate and the scientific and metaphysical debate. The picture shows Tagore giving a lecture at Tsinghua University.

After World War I, there was a sense of pessimism among European intellectuals, believing that these damages stemmed from the civilization of material science, while scholars such as Russell, Bergson, and Euken believed that Eastern civilizations such as China and India might be the way to salvation. In 1918, German young teacher Spengler wrote "The Decline of the West", with a first edition of 90000 copies, which became popular in Europe and was unprecedented since the publication of On the Origin of Species. It is believed that European civilization has reached its final stage, and Europeans should no longer cling to fantasies about the past, but instead focus on discipline, military, and technology. Gaisarin's "A Philosopher's Travel Diary" describes his travels to China, India, and the Americas, comparing various civilizations and believing that a life of contemplation should be advocated. Thomas Mann and Hesse also believed that the Western century had come to an end. At the same time, Eastern culture began to become popular in Europe. Some scholars have said, "The power and influence of Eastern culture in Europe has long since spread beyond the scope of a few recreational writers and specialized antiquarians to the majority of people, and all those who are mentally disturbed in this world are among them."

World War I also caused Asian intellectuals to reflect on Western civilization. For example, British Raj Nobel Laureate Tagore criticized Western culture's oppression of Eastern culture during his speech in Europe and advocated for the revival of Eastern culture during his speeches in China and Japan. Du Yaquan published articles such as "The Great War and China" and "The Feelings of the Great War" in the early stages of World War I, believing that the world war had aroused the "patriotism" and "self-awareness" of the Chinese people. He also believed that there should be a re-examination of Chinese and Western culture and that it should not be completely copied from the West. Chen Jiayi criticized new culturists for "almost always frowning when it comes to Eastern culture as the irrelevance of feces, maggots, and dungs", and for "self-destructing the cultural identity of one's own race as a Chinese, which is influenced by foreign theories, but also due to the lack of profound research and clear concepts of the true value of one's own culture among Chinese people.

=== Oriental culture school ===
Chinese radicals and liberals were disdainful of the post World War I response from both East and West and saw such a response as retrograde and reactionary, as in the words of Hu Shih: "This kind of talk, which was originally a pathological psychology for a while, is appealing to the exaggeration of the oriental nation; the old forces in the East have thus increased a lot of arrogance." Hu Shih, Li Dazhao, Qu Qiubai, Wu Zhihui, Yang Mingzhai, and others refuted Liang Shuming and Liang Qichao: Hu Shih believed that the democratization and scientification of China and India were inevitable; Li Dazhao and Qu Qiubai believed that only by launching the proletarian revolution can there be real cultural development.

In 1923, Deng Zhongxia, a member of the Chinese Communist Party, criticized the opponents of the New Culture Movement and named it the "Oriental Culture Faction". Deng Zhongxia regarded Liang Qichao, Carsun Chang, and Zhang Dongsun as a group of Eastern Culture Factions, believing that this faction was "fundamentally Chinese in ideology, but its face was painted with Western colors"; Liang Shuming is a member of the same faction. Although he has seven parts of Indian thought and three parts of Chinese thought in his foundation, he claims that Western thought also holds his place in his face; Zhang Shizhao is a member of the same faction, with "fundamentally Chinese ideology", but he achieved the title of "Europeanization" and simply "erased even the Western color". Before that, Qu Qiubai of the Chinese Communist Party also used the term "Oriental Culture School" in "Oriental Culture and the world revolution". The publication of "The Shadow of European Journey" marked the rise of the "Eastern Cultural School", and the publication of "Eastern and Western Culture and Its Philosophy" at the end of the same year confirmed the influence of the "Eastern Cultural School".

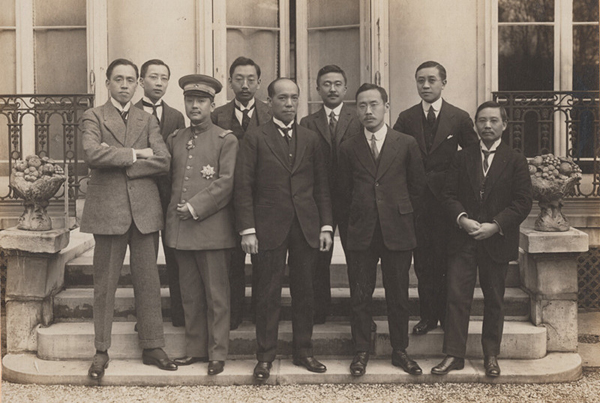
In 1919, the Chinese European delegation took a group photo in Paris (Jiang Baili on the second left, Liang Qichao on the third left, and Carsun Chang on the fourth left).

==== The Shadow Record of European Journey ====
In 1918, Liang Qichao led a semi-official Paris Peace Observation Mission, with Jiang Baili, Carsun Chang, and Ding Wenjiang, in Europe to visit European intellectuals and politicians, including Bergson and Liang Qichao's teacher Putra. The text of Liang Qichao's trip was compiled into the "Record of the Heart of Europe", which was serialized in Shanghai's "Current Affairs News" and Beijing's "Morning News" six months after returning to China. Liang Qichao asserted the failure of materialistic Western civilization, and his text reverberated greatly in China. Liang Qichao expressed his feelings and denied the claim that science is omnipotent, and believed that China plays a huge responsibility in the reconstruction of world civilization. Chinese youth should love and respect their own culture and contribute to the reconstruction of world civilization.

==== "East–West culture and Its Philosophy" ====
Between 1920 and 1921, Liang Shuming, who studied Chinese and Indian philosophy, gave a speech titled "East–West Culture and Its Philosophy" at Peking University and other places, and published the speech manuscript in 1921. Liang believed that culture is the "way of life" of a nation, while life is an endless "desire". The Western civilization "intended" to move forward and emphasized struggle, resulting in democracy and science, but lacking in metaphysics; Chinese culture's "desire" is self-acting, harmonious, and moderate, content with the status quo, self-satisfied, and less material than Western culture; Indian civilization, on the other hand, abstained from sexual desires to deny the existence of problems, leading to the full development of spirit and religion and the backwardness of material conditions. Liang said that Western culture needs to change and shift towards Eastern culture; China needs to accept the Western culture, but it needs to change the attitude of Western culture towards life and critically present China's original attitude. Although Liang's "East–West Culture and Its Philosophy" is an academic work, it was printed eight times in four years, and its best-selling is unprecedented in history.

==== Debate between Hu Shih and Liang Shuming ====
On April 1, 1923, Hu Shih published "Reading Mr. Liang Shuming's East–West Culture and Its Philosophy", believing that Liang Shuming's statement "made a mistake of convergence": Liang said that orientalization must become a global culture if it can still exist, while Hu believed that whether a culture can become a global culture cannot be subjectively speculated, but needs to be objectively based and related to the historical context. Liang divided Chinese culture, Western culture, and Indian culture into three categories. Hu believed that both Western and Indian cultures have a time of "desire" to move forward or backward, and referred to Liang as "really talking nonsense with his eyes closed". Liang replied to Hu, saying that his language was close to being harsh and quite lacking in elegance; there was no resentment at all, why was that so?" Hu defended his differences in temperament, and Liang replied, "It's a shame to have followed the teachings! I've been patient for a long time, but I still haven't realized it myself.

But later, Hu wrote in "A Year and a Half Review" that in fact, the most valuable article in the "Effort Weekly" may not be our political discourse, (Note: Carsun Chang and the New Culture School are engaged in the debate between science and metaphysics.) but the criticism of Liang and Carsun Chang. In October 1923, Liang gave a speech at Peking University, refuting the statement made by Hu in his "A Year and a Half Review":

However, I am an obstacle to them! I am an obstacle to their movement of intellectual innovation! How can I afford to do that? Is this what I want? This makes me very sad. I don't feel that I am against their movement! I don't feel that I am their enemy, they are my enemy. ...... I don't want to defeat Chen Zhongfu and Hu Shih before I can succeed; the success of Chen Zhongfu and Hu Shih is also my success.

==== Reaction of "Oriental Culture School" ====
Most of the "Eastern culturalists" disagree with the ideas in "East–West Culture and Its Philosophy" and consider the book neither "Indian" nor "Chinese" enough. Tang Yongtong believed that Liang's knowledge was shallow and narrow, and "shallow leads to no exploration of the source, narrow leads to multiple errors", making him unqualified to discuss the differences between Chinese and Western cultures. Carsun Chang believes that the meaning of nouns in "East–West Culture and Its Philosophy" is ambiguous, such as confusing the life that Confucius refers to with the life of the universe that Umang refers to, and says that its academic value is therefore understandable. Zhang Dongsun's "Reading East–West Culture and Its Philosophy" points out that" Liang's so-called 'East–West Culture and Its Philosophy' is only a philosophical theory of Eastern and Western cultures, not a national psychology theory of Eastern and Western cultures. He believes that Liang's views are only superficial observations. Although Monk Taixu praised "East–West Culture and Its Philosophy" as the "first masterpiece since the New Culture Movement in recent years", he pointed out that since Liang believed that Confucianism could not solve the problem, he did not directly adopt Buddhism, but instead had to first exclude Buddhism and Confucianism. The Kuomintang, who used the pseudonym "Evil Stone" as their pen name, shared the views of Liang Shuming and also pointed out this contradiction.

Liang Shuming also criticized Liang Qichao's "Record of European Journey", stating that "in fact, none of what Ren Gong said is right", pointing out that "the promotion of Chinese culture is completely confused and unreasonable when it comes to the inadequacy of Chinese civilization." He believed that "if Chinese things are only as valuable as Westernization, they are still inferior to others and have no value! If Chinese culture is valuable, it must be at its special point".

=== Xueheng School ===
In January 1922, "Xueheng" was founded, and scholars including Mei Guangdi, Hu Xiansu, Wu Mi, and Liu Yizheng expressed their opinions in "Xueheng". The authors were mostly centered around National Southeast University, but there were also Wang Guowei, Chen Yinke, Tang Yongtong, and others from Beijing who participated, also known as the "Xueheng School". Different from Liang Qichao and Du Yaquan's reconciliation of Chinese and Western cultures, the ideological roots of the Xueheng School lie in Irving Babbitt's "new humanism", and most of the Xueheng school came from a Western ideological background. (Note: The "Book of the Two Liangs" refers to Liang Qichao's Shadow Record of European Tours and Liang Shuming's East–West Culture and Philosophy.) Therefore, Ch'ien Mu described "the book that led to the two Liangs is like a drum, and both of them criticize modern thoughts." However, the Xueheng School wants to directly correct Western thoughts, which is slightly different from those who separate the two Liangs with Chinese and Western thoughts."

Babbitt's "New Humanism" believes that the spirit of ancient Greece, Confucianism, Buddhism, and other classical cultures as well as the traditional order should be restored to repair the ills of modern society. He also believes that: "If we want to create a new culture in China today, we should take both the essence of Chinese and Western civilization, integrate them. Our ancient and modern academic ethics and literary and artistic regulations are all studied, preserved, developed, and glorified. And the western ancient and modern academic ethics, literary and artistic regulations should also be studied, absorbed, translated, understood and used."

The Xueheng School believes that the New Culture Movement's way of opposing old and new cultures is through the destruction of culture rather than creation, As Hu Xiansu commented, "Today's critics still have a tradition of seeking novelty, striving for extremism, treating vulgarity as nobility, and violence as bravery. This is not a blessing for the country and society, nor is a blessing for the future of the new culture." The Xueheng School also criticized the new culture for simplifying Western culture: In recent years, there have been so-called New Culture Movers in China, whose arguments are often deceitful and aimed at destruction. However, their superficial fallacies are inconsistent with the teachings of sages from ancient and modern times, the works of wise people, historical facts, the spirit of laws and regulations, as well as the conscience and common sense of ordinary people. Their materials are only based on the ideas of a school of thought and articles from a school of thought that has been regarded as dross and poison in the West, representing Western culture. Its writing is exaggerated and self-reliant, with a style that is neither horse nor ox, neither central nor western, making it difficult for readers to comprehend.

In addition, the Xueheng School, like the Eastern Cultural School, advocates for the reconciliation of Eastern and Western cultures, such as Wu Mi's belief that "if one does not know the old, they cannot speak of the new". Wu Mi also pointed out that the old and new do not necessarily mean that the new is better than the old. Natural sciences are often like this, but humanities are not. Wu Mi advocates that the Chinese people are not extremely conservative or disdainful towards the old, nor are they extremely superstitious or repelled towards Europeanization.

== Criticism and interpretation ==
=== The pioneer of cultural research ===
Wang Yuanhua believes that the debate between Chen Duxiu and Du Yaquan on Eastern and Western cultures opened up a "pioneer in cultural research" in China:

This debate was the first to conduct a comparative study of Eastern and Western cultures, providing a comprehensive analysis of the two cultural traditions, and proposing different perspectives on the exchange of Chinese and Western cultures, marking the beginning of cultural research in China. The major issues and viewpoints on these issues in future cultural research can almost be seen from this debate. It's broad thinking, solid arguments, and profound insights are often difficult for future generations to surpass. Looking through the materials at that time, I was quite surprised that today's research on Eastern and Western cultures seems to be repeating some important arguments in this debate. But today few people mention this debate, which cannot be overstated as a regret.

The East–West cultural debate before and after the May Fourth Movement did not reach a conclusion, leading to the resurgence of controversies over the "Chinese cultural standard theory" and the "overall Westernization theory" in the 1930s. In the 1930s, the Chiang Kai Shek government resumed respecting Confucius and restoring the past and launched the "New Life Movement" in Nanchang and other places. In 1935, Wang Xinming and 10 other Kuomintang Qing literati issued the "Declaration on Cultural Construction Based on China", believing that in modern times, discussions such as the New Culture Movement not only failed to solve China's survival crisis but also led to China's disappearance in the cultural field. Once this article was published, it met with opposition: Chen Xujing and other supporters of Westernization believed that the Chinese standard argument was a replica of Zhang Zhidong's "middle school as the body, and Western learning as the application", and proposed a comprehensive Westernization proposal. After the Chinese Civil War, both sides of the Cross-Strait relations began to compete for a definition of the spirit of the New Culture Movement. For example, the Government of China designated May 4 as Youth Day, while the Government of the Republic of China designated it as Literary Day.

==== Mainland China ====
After the Marco Polo Bridge Incident in 1937, Japanese aggression triggered a national crisis in China, and the recognition and preservation of Chinese cultural traditions became a trend. By the Proclamation of the People's Republic of China in 1949, Marxism had become the guiding Ideology and Ideological State Apparatuses. During the Cultural Revolution, Mao Zedong declared to implement the spirit of the "Cultural Revolution" of the May Fourth Movement. Mainland China began opening up to the outside world in the 1980s, reigniting the trend of Westernization. During this period, Wang Yuanhua believed that the debate was still repeating the Eastern and Western cultural debates around the May Fourth Movement. During this period, the academic community also began to criticize the relationship between radical politics during the New Culture Movement and the Cultural Revolution. After 2010, scholars in mainland China initiated another debate on "Chinese cultural subjectivity", which is also considered to be a repetition of the debate before and after May Fourth.

Hu Shih's controversial speech sparked a debate between Chinese and Western cultures in Taiwan in the 1960s. Hu Shi passed away in 1962 due to illness.

==== Taiwan ====
After the war in Taiwan and Hong Kong, there were conflicts among positivism-liberalism led by Hu Shih and Yin Haiguang, New Confucianism, scholars of the Three Principles of the People, and the Government of the Republic of China regarding whether Chinese cultural tradition, science, and democracy could coexist. Hu Shih's speech at the Taipei East Asia Science Education Conference in 1961 sparked a new debate between Chinese and Western cultures. In his speech, Hu Shih stated that "there is not much spiritual content in these old civilizations in the East" and called on Easterners to recognize this and make "intellectual preparations" for the "modern civilization of science and technology". As soon as the speech was published by Wen Xing magazine, the academic community in Taiwan was in an uproar: Xu Fuguan, in his article "Shame on the Chinese, Shame on the East" believed that Hu Shhi's appointment as the Dean of the Academia Sinica was a shame, while Hu Qiuyuan's principle in his article "Moving Beyond the Traditional Westernization School and the Russian Westernization School" believed that Hu Shih was only revisiting the old cliche of Hu Shih's comprehensive Westernization theory proposed thirty years ago. Li Ao defended Hu Shih with "A Look at the Disease for Those Who Talk about Chinese and Western Culture", which sparked a debate between young Taiwanese students and the older generation of scholars from Kuomintang who came to Taiwan about Chinese and Western culture. The debate ultimately ended with the seizure of Wenxing magazine. Hu Shih did not participate in this debate due to his recent illness.

=== Essence of East–West culture ===
==== Definition of differences ====
In 1919, Liang Shuming criticized the participants in the debate for their vague definition of Eastern and Western cultures: "For about two to three years, due to the so-called cultural movement, we have heard terms such as' Eastern and Western cultures' verbally or seen them in writing. However, although everyone speaks too much, do they have any real ideas? In our opinion, everyone does not know what Eastern and Western cultures are, and they just casually say it." Liang Shuming defined "What is Orientalization? What is Westernization?" in his book "East–West Cultures and Their Philosophy," and divided the three major problems of life-based on the possible satisfaction of "desire", namely, the satisfaction of human beings with things, the satisfaction of human beings with others, and the satisfaction of human beings with their own lives. The first issue can always be satisfied by hard work and the accumulation of experience and knowledge, and the desire to move forward, which corresponds to Western culture. The second issue cannot be judged, and can only be sought from oneself, which corresponds to Chinese culture. The third issue is that life, aging, illness, and death cannot be satisfied and can only be pursued from behind, which corresponds to Indian culture. In Liang Shuming's view, the difference between Eastern and Western cultures lies in the different directions of desire.

Some scholars believe that those who support traditional culture and those who oppose it believe that Eastern and Western cultures are different from China and foreign cultures, that there is a distinction between old and new cultures, that there is an emphasis on cultural nationalism to oppose learning from the West, and that there is an emphasis on cultural modernity to promote people's awareness of China's backwardness and difficulty in communication. Opponents of traditional culture believe that new culture is Western culture, while old culture is Eastern culture. Even though the civilizations of Han, Tang, Song, and Ming surpassed everything at that time, "old records cannot save the current famine." Supporters of traditional culture argue that the old and new are only a concept of time. During the Wuxu Reform, learning from the West was a new concept, and now contributing to world culture through Chinese culture is also new. They believe that Eastern and Western cultures are different in nature, making it difficult to compare their strengths and weaknesses.

==== Confucianism and secular culture ====
The debate revolves around the values of Eastern and Western cultures, but the perceptions of "Chinese culture" vary among the parties involved: The "Chinese culture" in the eyes of those who support Westernization refers to secular culture, while those who support the preservation of traditional culture refers to Confucian classical culture. Chen Duxiu thought that Confucian ethics were mostly vague and that in reality they "begin with the gentleman and end with the villain". Hu Shih, on the other hand, thought that Chinese culture was "the most materialistic and nasty culture in the world." And, Fu Ssu-nien thought that the Chinese public's obsession with food, clothing, and housing is a "materialistic outlook on life." Liang Shuming's "East–West Culture and Its Philosophy" also denies the superiority of Chinese secular culture. The faction that supports the preservation of traditional culture believes that traditional Confucian culture, which emphasizes moral cultivation, is a solution to the imbalance of Western rationalism.

Critics of traditional Chinese culture, such as Chen Duxiu and Hu Shih, did not completely deny Confucius himself and all his teachings. This group mainly criticized the practical significance of Confucius' teachings, rather than its historical value. For example, Hu Shih claimed that he opposed Confucianism but respected Confucius and his early Confucian disciples, including Mencius. Chen Duxiu also said that he opposed Confucianism, but he is not against Confucius himself, nor did he say that he was worthless in ancient society.

==== Conservatism and radicalism ====
The attitude of the "Eastern Cultural Faction" towards preserving traditional culture was once criticized as a remnant of feudal culture. However, although they supported the preservation of traditional culture, they did not support the feudal system. Among the "Eastern Cultural Faction", either supporters of the late Qing Dynasty's reform and revolution, or a new generation of intellectuals, there was a general aversion to the political situation controlled by warlords and the wave of restoration. They did not support cultural immutability but rather supported the harmony between China and the West as a way to cope with the transition period between the old and the new. His viewpoint may have provided a guiding role for the formation of New Confucianism.

Scholars have pointed out that in the debate between Eastern and Western cultures, the views of Chen Duxiu and others are not flawless. In the process of comparing Eastern and Western cultures, the Chen Duxiu faction often attributed social drawbacks to cultural backwardness, and even specifically compared the strengths of the West with the weaknesses of China. For example, in "Political Issues in Today's China", Chen Duxiu compared China's authoritarian politics, gods, kings, alchemy, spells, fortune telling, divination, etc. with Western civil rights, rule of law, equality, science, and health, indicating that China should not be conservative but should learn from Western innovation. For example, Chen Duxiu did not believe that Confucius' advocacy of "kindness, courtesy, thrift, honesty, shame, and loyalty and forgiveness" falls within the scope of Confucianism, believing that these virtues are universal and not unique to Confucianism.

Some scholars have pointed out that after learning from the West for decades, China's national affairs have still declined, and the choices of Chinese intellectuals have begun to be alienated. One faction chose to adopt more "advanced" theories to guide social revolution; The other faction, frustrated with learning from the West, has been inspired by their national cultural awareness and self-esteem, thus beginning to return to traditional culture and find new ways out.

=== The spread of socialism ===
Although all parties in the debate hold different positions on the issue of Eastern and Western cultures, they do not oppose socialism. The initiator of the debate, Chen Duxiu, pointed out in 1915 that "there are three things that are most capable of changing the ways of the past and refreshing people's minds: one is the theory of human rights, one is the theory of biological evolution, and the other is socialism." Hu Shih also commented, "This great socialist movement is still in progress, but his achievements are already considerable." The main supporters of Eastern culture also agree with socialism, Du Yaquan believed that the world economy after World War I would tend towards socialism, while Liang Shuming advocated Celtic socialism.

Some scholars believe that while criticizing Western culture, the conservative faction also exposes the darkness of capitalism and encourages people to accept socialism. The thorough anti-feudal struggle, the goal of transforming the old system, and the Marxist class struggle and social development concept are easy to communicate, promoting the dissemination of Marxism in China. This debate prompted Chen Duxiu, Li Dazhao, and others to shift towards Marxism. Zi Zhongyun believed that the debate between Eastern and Western cultures lasted for a hundred years, and its climax was around the May Fourth Movement; The traditional Chinese patriarchal system has been shaken in the debate between Eastern and Western cultures, and Marxism with Chinese characteristics has gradually merged with traditional culture in mainland China. However, the debate itself has not yet been answered.

=== Modernization and Westernization ===
All factions support China's modernization, but their specific propositions differ. Some scholars believe that the Westernization movement advocates embracing modernity and is committed to exposing the backwardness of Chinese secular culture, striving to transform the parts that do not adapt to modernity. Conservatives are not unaware of the characteristics of Chinese secular culture, but the consequences of world wars and material desires that have occurred in European civilization have prompted them to reflect on modernity. In the view of conservatives, excessive Westernization has resulted in negative consequences such as moral decline and class division. Conservatives believe that Confucian ideas can be reconciled with it, while New Confucianism later adopted "Confucian capitalism" as a proposition for China's modernization. In the view of the Westernization camp, the reason why China did not have a democratic and developed market economy at that time was due to insufficient Westernization, so it should be advocated for comprehensive Westernization.

The debate before and after the May Fourth Movement did not use terms such as "modernization", but mainly revolved around "orientalization" and "westernization". It was not until the 1930s that Chinese scholars began to analyze the differences between "Westernization" and "modernization" in the controversy between "Chinese cultural standard theory" and "Comprehensive Westernization theory". American political scholar Huntington believes that modernization does not necessarily mean Westernization, and societies pursuing modern civilization do not have to give up their own culture. However, up to now, there are still debates about Western standards and Chinese discourse in various fields of reform in China. Some scholars believe that the debate between Eastern and Western cultures is still the crux of the modernity process in Chinese society.

== See also ==
- Related debates: New Confucianism, Total Westernization
- Related concepts:
  - East–West dichotomy
  - Eastward spread of Western learning: Eastward spread of Western learning, Self-Strengthening Movement, Hundred Days' Reform, 1911 Revolution, New Culture Movement, May Fourth Movement, Exceeding the UK, catching the USA, Four Modernizations
  - Modernity: Modern era, Modernity, Modernization theory, Westernization, Clash of Civilizations, The End of History and the Last Man
  - Marxism: Marxism, Chinese Marxist philosophy (Socialism with Chinese characteristics)
- Similar debates: Slavophilia and Westernizers in the 19th century's the Russian Empire
