= East–West dichotomy =

Perceived difference between the Eastern and Western worlds

East–West dichotomy

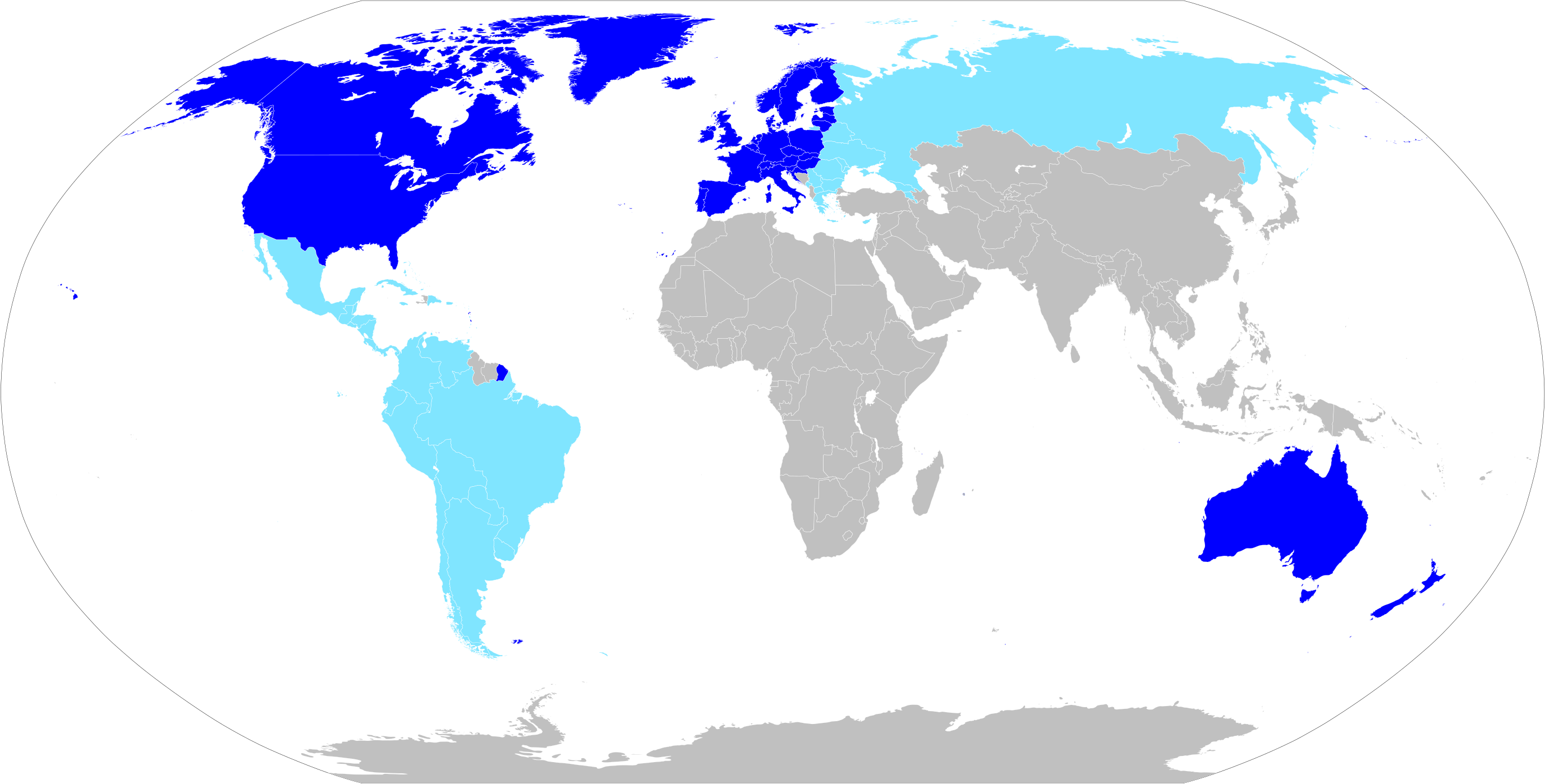
A map of the "Western world" based on Samuel P. Huntington's 1996 Clash of Civilizations. In turquoise are the Orthodox World and Latin America, which are either a part of the West or distinct civilizations intimately related to the West.

Regions generally considered to be the cultural and civilizational East or the Orient, most of which are constituents of the Muslim world (Greater Middle East), the Far East, and the Indian subcontinent.

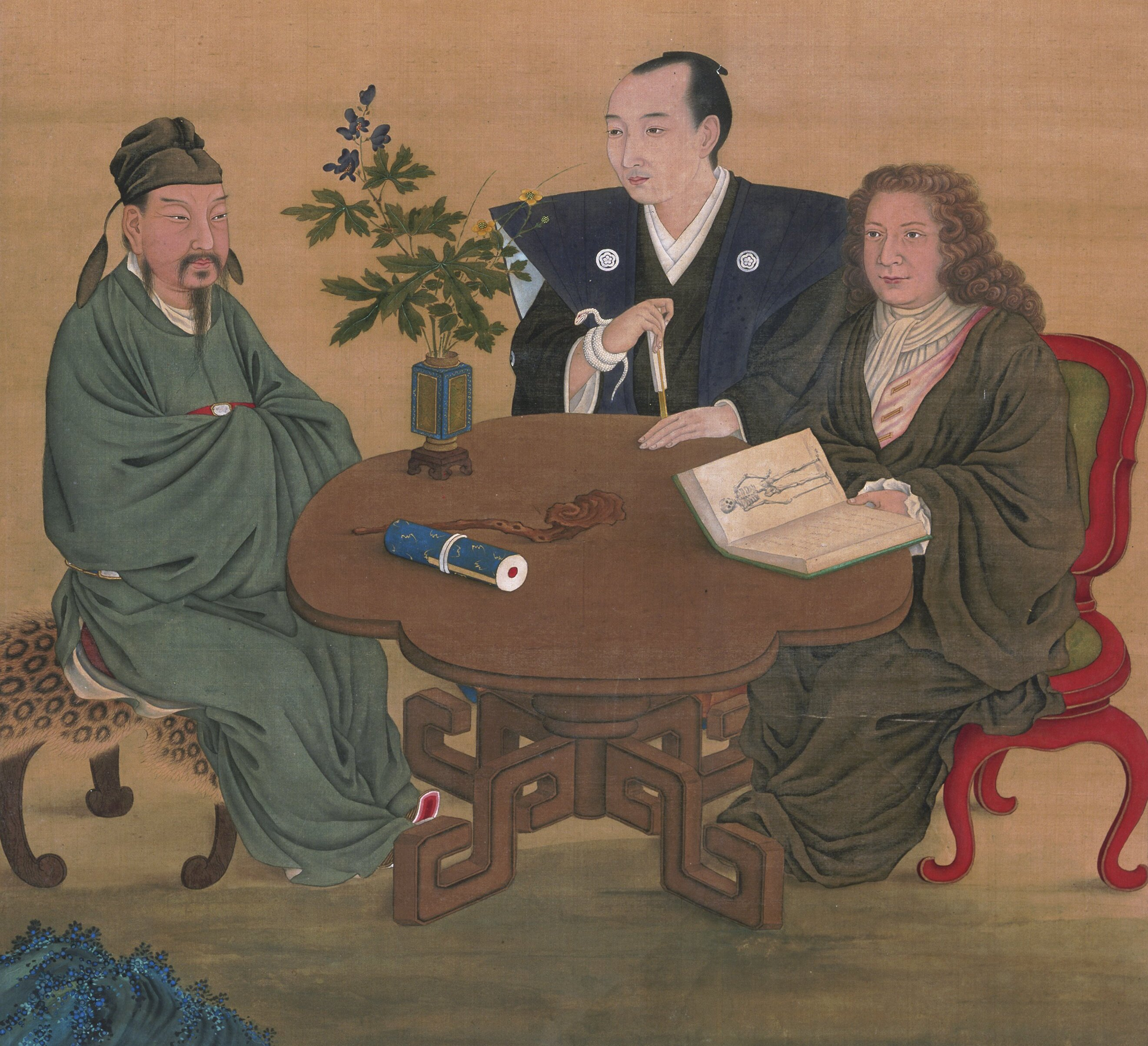
A meeting of Japan, China, and the West (Shiba Kōkan, late 18th century)

In sociology, the East–West dichotomy is the perceived difference between the Eastern and the Western worlds. Cultural and religious rather than geographical in division, the boundaries of East and West are not fixed, but vary according to the criteria adopted by individuals using the term.

Used in discussing such studies as management, economics, international relations, and linguistics, the concept is criticized for overlooking regional hybridity.

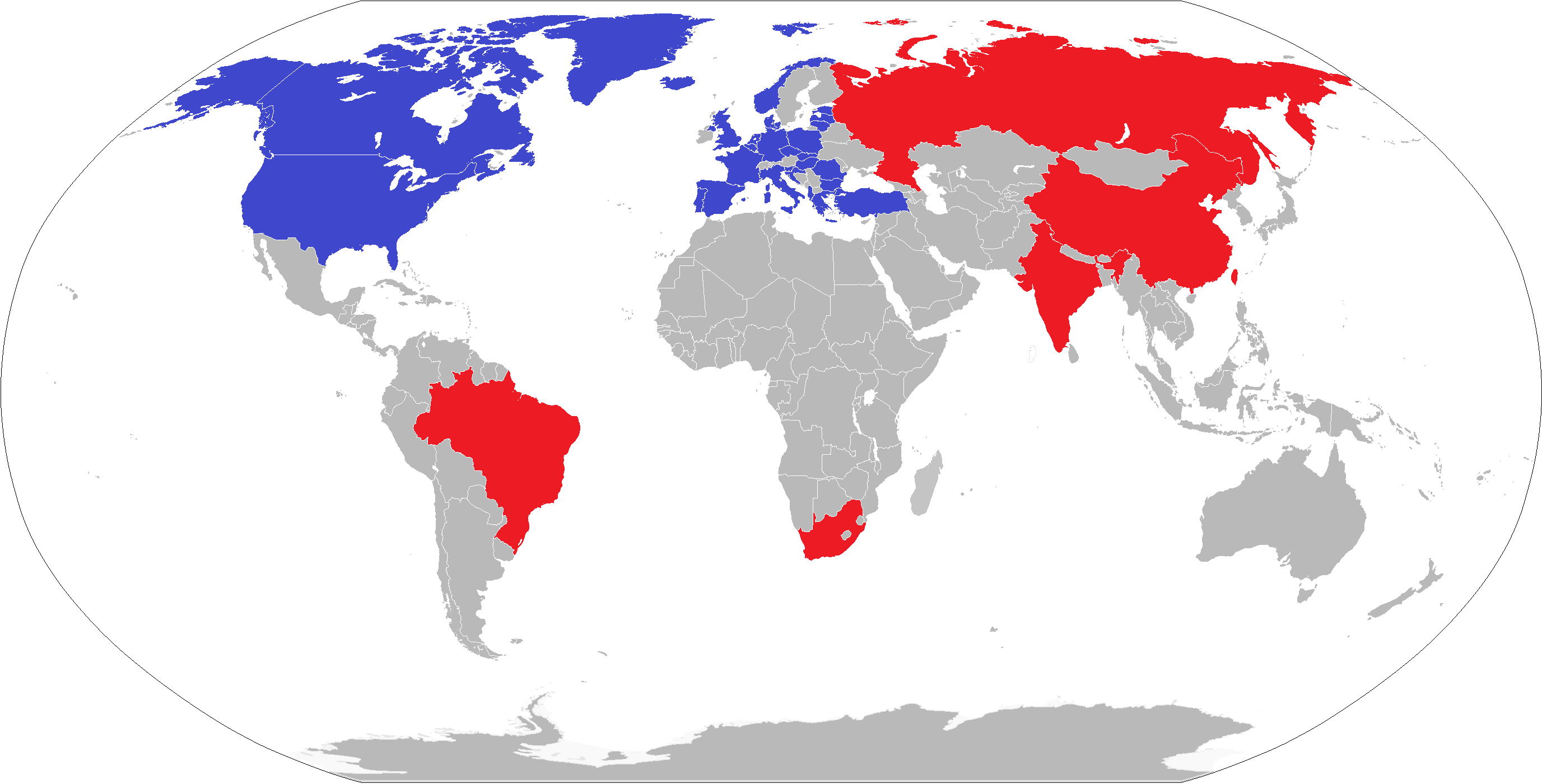
Countries involved in BRICS (red) and countries involved in NATO (blue). These geopolitical divisions are sometimes seen to reflect the cultural and civilizational division between the Eastern and Western worlds, but more accurately reflect the subjective self-identification of a country’s government and political leadership.

== Divisions ==
Conceptually, the boundaries are cultural, rather than geographical, as a result of which Australia and New Zealand are typically grouped in the West (despite being geographically in the east), while Islamic nations are, regardless of location, grouped in the East. The culture line can be particularly difficult to place in regions of cultural diversity such as Bosnia and Herzegovina, whose citizens may themselves identify as East or West depending on ethnic or religious background. Further, residents of different parts of the world perceive the boundaries differently; for example, some Central European scholars define Russia as East, especially after Russia's turn to the East, while some consider it to be part of the West,, and the topic has been and remains heavily debated and lacks consensus both outside of and within Russia itself. Islamic nations regard it and other predominantly Christian nations as the West.

== Historical concepts ==
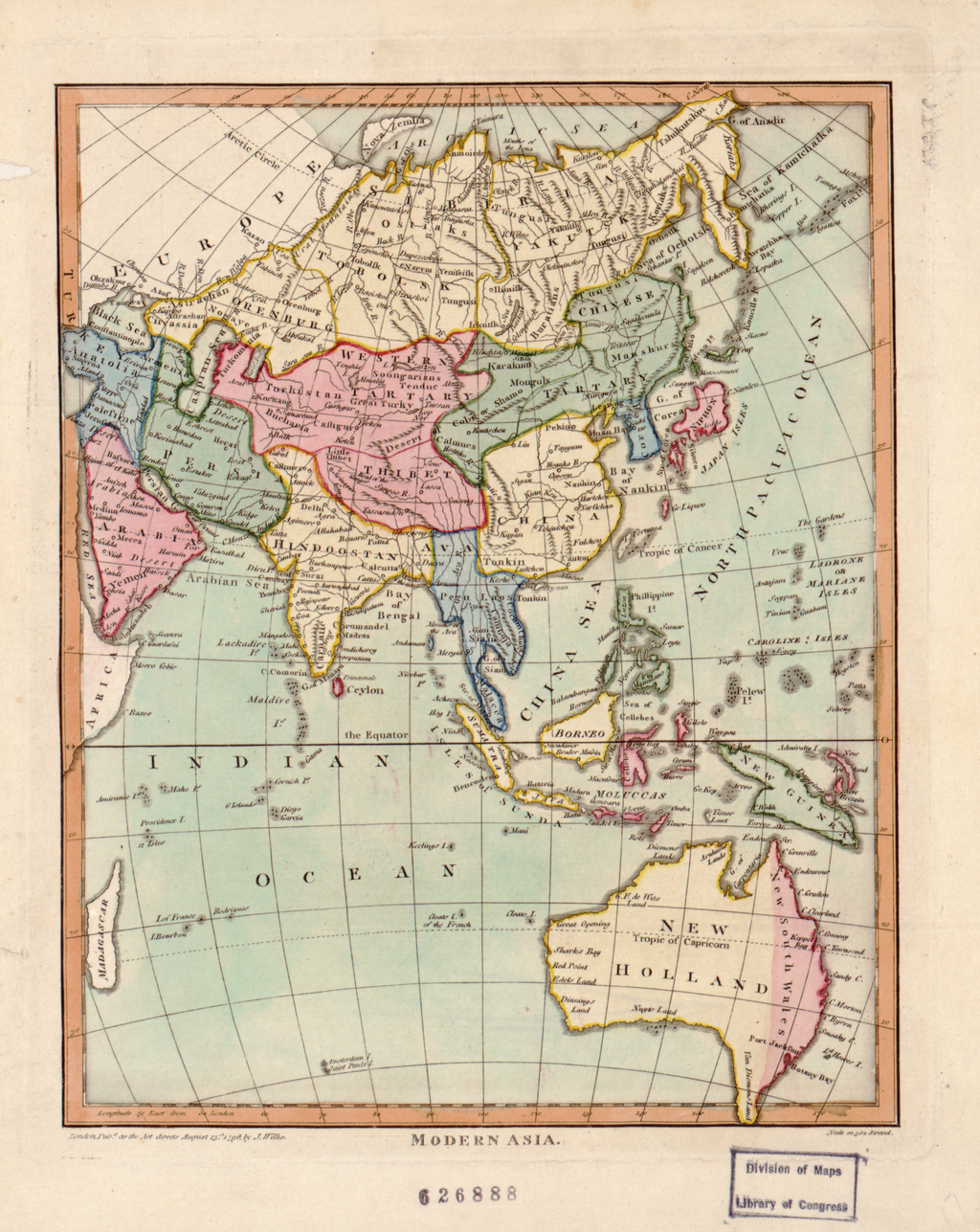
In the 1700s, the Eastern world comprised the continents of Asia and Australia (New Holland).

The concept has been used in both "Eastern" and "Western" nations. Japanese sinologist Tachibana Shiraki, in the 1920s, wrote of the need to unify Asia—East Asia, Southeast Asia and South Asia but excluding Central Asia and West Asia—and form a "New East" that might combine culturally in balancing against the West. Japan continued to make much of the concept, known as Pan-Asianism, throughout World War II, in propaganda. In China, it was encapsulated during the Cold War in a 1957 speech by Mao Zedong, who launched a slogan when he said, "This is a war between two worlds. The West Wind cannot prevail over the East Wind; the East Wind is bound to prevail over the West Wind."

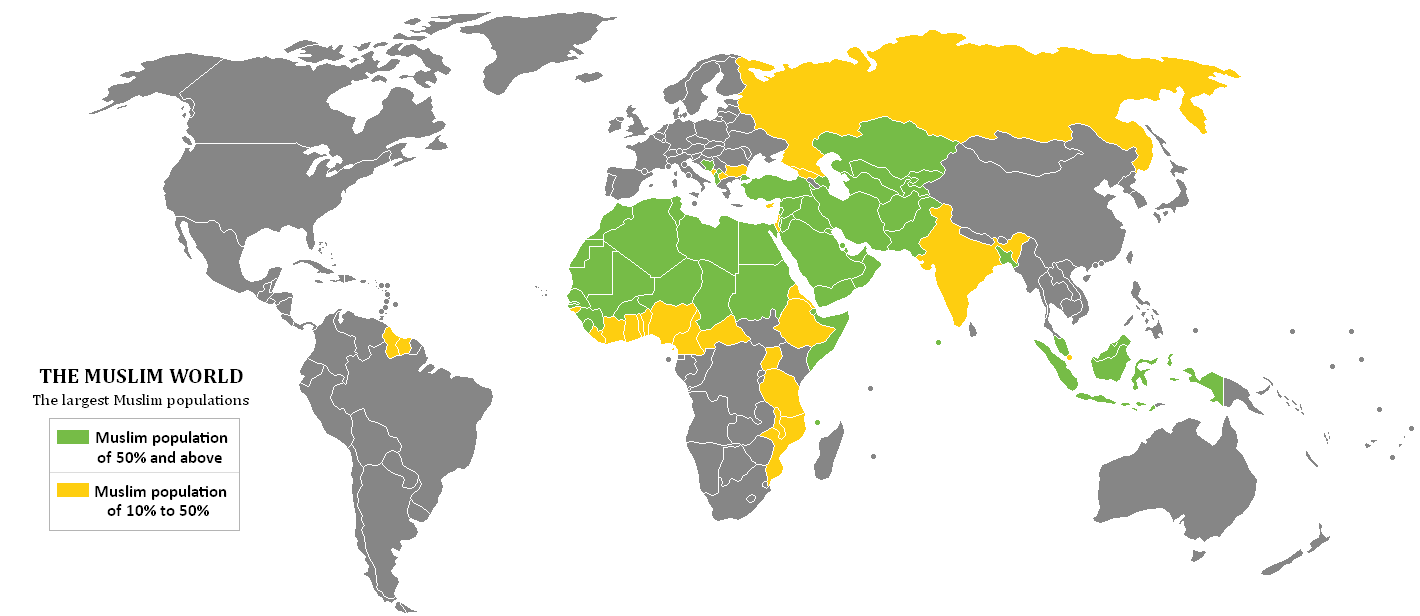
Muslim percentages: green 50% and above, yellow 10-49%

To Western writers, in the 1940s, it became bound up with an idea of aggressive, "frustrated nationalism", which was seen as "intrinsically anti- or non-Western"; sociologist Frank Furedi wrote, "The already existing intellectual assessment of European nationalism adapted to the growth of the Third World variety by developing the couplet of mature Western versus immature Eastern nationalism.... This East-West dichotomy became an accepted part of Western political theory." Iraqi novelist Dhu'l-Nun Ayyub would include aspects of this concept in his stories. An example can be found in his story "al-Dutkur Ibrahim" that portrays the character, Dr. Ibrahim, being the epitome of evil and corruption, and an anglophile who turns against his people's interests. Another example is in his 1957 story "Orphans on Christmas Day" in which an Iranian Man and a Viennese woman overcome cultural differences to be together. The story is regarded by critics as an allegory for potential peace between East and West during the height of colonialism.

The 1978 book Orientalism, by Edward Said, was highly influential in further establishing concepts of the East–West dichotomy in the Western world, bringing into college lectures a notion of the East as seen as "characterized by religious sensibilities, familial social orders, and ageless traditions" in contrast to Western "rationality, material and technical dynamism, and individualism."

More recently, the divide has also been posited as an Islamic "East" and an American and European "West." Critics note that an Islamic/non-Islamic East–West dichotomy is complicated by the global dissemination of Islamic fundamentalism and by cultural diversity within Islamic nations, moving the argument "beyond that of an East-West dichotomy and into a tripartite situation."

== Applications ==
The East–West dichotomy has been used in studying a range of topics, including management, economics and linguistics. Knowledge Creation and Management (2007) examines it as the difference in organizational learning between Western cultures and Eastern cultures. It has been widely used in exploring the period of rapid economic growth that has been termed the "East-Asian miracle" in segments of East Asia, particularly the Asian Tigers, following World War II. Some sociologists, in line with the West as a model of modernity posited by Arnold J. Toynbee, have perceived the economic expansion as a sign of the "Westernization" of the region, but others look for explanation in cultural/racial characteristics of the East, embracing concepts of fixed Eastern cultural identity in a phenomenon described as "New Orientalism". Both approaches to the East–West dichotomy have been criticized for failing to take into account the historical hybridity of the regions.

The concept has also been brought to bear on examinations of intercultural communication. Asians are widely described as embracing an "inductive speech pattern" in which a primary point is approached indirectly, but Western societies are said to use "deductive speech" in which speakers immediately establish their point. That is attributed to a higher priority among Asians in harmonious interrelations, but Westerners are said to prioritize direct communication. 2001's Intercultural Communication: A Discourse Approach described the East–West dichotomy linguistically as a "false dichotomy", noting that both Asian and Western speakers use both forms of communication.

== Criticism ==
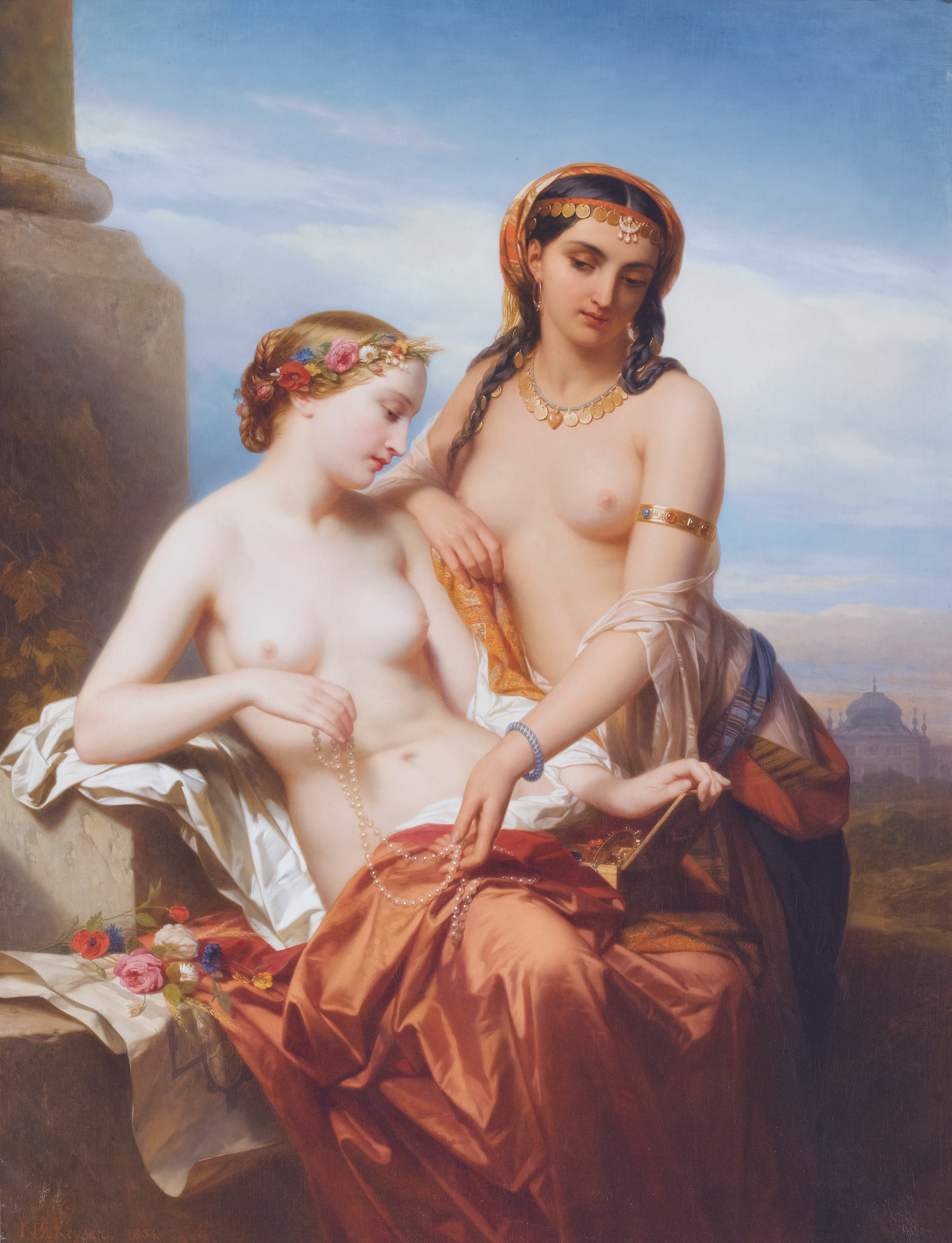
The Orient and the Occident, by Nicaise de Keyser (1854)

In addition to difficulties in defining regions and overlooking hybridity, the East–West dichotomy has been criticized for creating an artificial construct of regional unification that allows one voice to claim authority to speak for multitudes. In "The Triumph of the East?", Mark T. Berger speaks to the issue as relates to examination of the "East-Asian miracle":

The historical power of the East-West dichotomy, and the fixed conceptions of culture/race to which it is linked, have increasingly allowed the national elites of the region to speak not only for their 'nations,' but even for Asia and Asians.... There are numerous instances of Western scholars, intent on challenging North American and/or Western hegemony in both material and discursive terms, ending up uncritically privileging the elite narratives of power-holders in Asia as authentic representatives of a particular non-Western nation or social formation ...

== See also ==
- Clash of Civilizations
- East–West cultural debate in early 20th century China
- Global North and Global South
- Inglehart–Welzel cultural map of the world
- Oriental Despotism
- Orientalism
