= Dhu'l-Nun Ayyub =

Iraqi novelist and editor (1908 – 1988)

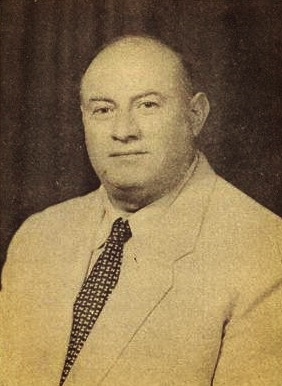
- Ayyub in 1983
- Native name: Arabic: ذو النون أيوب
- Born: 1908; Mosul, Ottoman Empire
- Died: 1988 (aged 79–80); Austria
- Occupation: Novelist, journalist, editor
- Period: Kingdom of Iraq
- Genre: Literary realism

Dhu'l-Nun Ayyub (Arabic: ذو النون أيوب; 1908 – 1988) was an Iraqi novelist, journalist, art critic, and editor. Known for his short stories, he was considered one of the pioneers of Iraqi literature at his time and was widely read in Iraq.

== Early life and education ==
Dhu'l-Nun Ayyub was born in the city of Mosul in 1908 during the last days of the Ottoman Empire. Ayyub was the son of a Mosul merchant. He completed his studies there at an Islamic madrasa and a Mosul High School. He then completed his university studies at the Higher Teachers' College in Baghdad, graduating in 1929.

== Writing career ==
By the 1930s, Ayyub was already prolific and well-established in Iraq as a writer of short stories. At the time, he was working as a mathematics teacher in Baghdad and had already published four collections of short stories that he wrote. In 1939, he published his most well-known literary work "al-Duktur Ibrahim" which would also be followed by another story "Nahwa al-Qimma" published in his fifth story collection titled "Burj Babil" (Tower of Babel).

The novel, a social critic of Iraqi society, follows the character of Dr. Ibrahim, depicted as the epitome of corruption and self-seeking. Dr. Ibrahim's portrayal as an evil person is akin to a caricature, which was noticed by his readers and thought to be a clear attack on the then-Director of Education Dr. Muhammad Fadhel al-Jamali. Dr. Ibrahim was portrayed as a humble man who obtained a PhD from a foreign university and sought to gain political power and wealth in Iraq. Al-Jamali, who was then the employer of Ayyub as a teacher, would berate Ayyub's job and exiled him to a remote northern Iraqi village as a punishment. Ayyub would deny that he had written the stories would the intent of mocking al-Jamali in the Mosul magazine al-Majalla, of which he was the editor of, and said that his main purpose was to portray corruption and lack of freedom.

In 1954, Ayyub would resettle in Vienna where he would spend the rest of his life in. He would publish a collection of short stories he had written shortly after World War II in 1957 titled "Qisas min Fiyina" (Stories from Vienna).

== Literary style ==
Ayyub's works are characterized by the simplicity of their plot, precision, and aphoristic language, combined with the tendency to edify inherent in Arabic prose. The creative individuality of the author, who depicts the life of the "little man" in his works, was formed under the influence of writers such as the Russian writers Anton Chekhov, and Maxim Gorky and the Egyptian writers Taha Hussein and Mahmud Taymur.

Ayyub's stories also included aspects of the East–West dichotomy. Such as Dr. Ibrahim, portrayed as an amoral evil character, marries an English woman and is portrayed as an anglophile with a hatred of his native country. Dr. Ibrahim also further states how he wishes to "shed this skin of mine to replace it with white skin, like that of the British, and thus become one of them..." A different portrayal of the dichotomy is explored in his 1957 romance story "Aytam fi eid al-Milad" (Orphans on Christmas Day) which shows an Iranian man and an Austrian woman overcoming cultural differences to be together. The story itself is noted to be an allegory of harmony between East and West.

== Selected works ==
Dhu'l-Nun Ayyub had several short stories collections, these include:

- Rusul al-Thaqafa (1937)
- Wahi al-Faan (1938)
- Al-Dhahiyya (1938)
- Sadiqi (1938)
- Burj Babil (1939)
- Al-Kadihun (1939)
- Qisas min Fiyina (1957)
- Mukhtarat Dhu'l-Nun Ayyub (1958)

== See also ==
- Iraqi literature
