= Taipei (disambiguation) =

Taipei is the capital and a special municipality of Taiwan (officially known as the Republic of China).

Taipei may also refer to:

- New Taipei City, formerly Taipei County, a municipality located in northern Taiwan and encircles Taipei
- Taipei–Keelung metropolitan area, commonly known as Greater Taipei, including Taipei City, New Taipei City, and Keelung Port
- Chinese Taipei, the name used by Taiwan in some international organizations due to political pressure from the People's Republic of China
- Government of Taiwan, called after its location
- Taipei (novel), 2013 autobiographical novel by American writer Tao Lin
- Microsoft Mahjong, formerly named Taipei, computer game version of mahjong solitaire
