= Chinese Learning as Substance, Western Learning for Application =

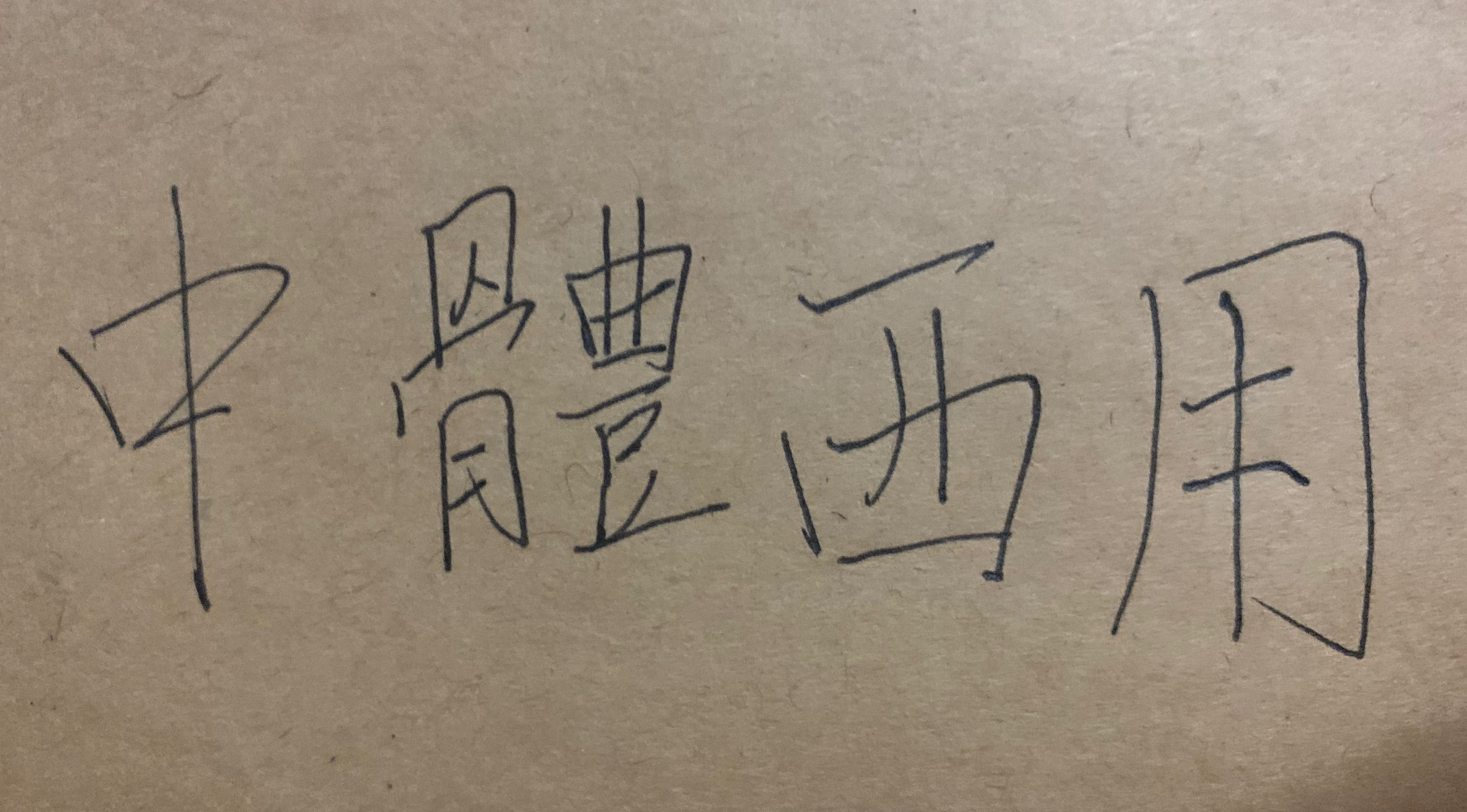
Zhongti Xiyong

The idea of "Chinese Learning as Substance, Western Learning for Application" (simplified Chinese: 中体西用; traditional Chinese: 中體西用; pinyin: zhōngtǐ xīyòng) was initially proposed by Feng Guifen in his Xiaopinlu kangyi (Protests from the cottage of Feng Guifen), written in 1861 after the Second Opium War. At the time, leading Chinese thinkers were interrogating how to approach the threat posed by encroaching Western states. Feng argued for China's self-strengthening and industrialization by borrowing Western technology and military systems, while retaining core Neo-Confucian principles. These ideas were further elaborated on by Zhang Zhidong in 1898 in his book Quanxue pian as "Traditional (Chinese) learning as substance, New (Western) learning as application" (“舊學為體，新學為用”). “Zhongti xiyong” became a popular slogan used in the late Qing Reforms, including the Self-Strengthening Movement and Hundred Days' Reform. The concept was widespread among intellectuals in the late 19th and early 20th century, and it remains relevant in the modern studies of China-West cultural relationship.

== Background ==
After the Anglo-Chinese First Opium War (1839–1842), Wei Yuan advocated for China to learn “shipbuilding techniques and weapons production” from the west in order to subdue foreign invaders (“師夷長技以制夷”). He wrote about this idea in his book Illustrated Treatise on the Maritime Kingdoms (《海国图志》)in 1843. In the latter half of the 19th century (and early portion of the 20th century), there was heated debate in China about how the country could survive the threat from foreign powers and move towards modernity. As the Qing Dynasty moved closer to collapse, two general camps of thought emerged: Conservatives thinkers who rejected the utility of modern military methods, and the Progressionists who were eager to not only adopt Western technology but also Western political systems like parliamentary sovereignty.

== Zhang Zhidong's Quanxue pian ==
The proposal of “Chinese Learning as Substance, Western Learning for Application” by Zhang Zhidong (张之洞, 1837–1909) in 1898 in his book Quanxue Pian (《劝学篇》"Exhortation to Learning") was seen as a reconciliation between the conservatives and the progressionists. Zhang stated that “it was necessary to maintain the orthodox Confucian basis of society, and if Western thought was to be accepted then [it could] only [be] in order to strengthen the material basis of society, particularly military equipment in view of the European encroachment in China since the First Opium War (1839-42)". Some scholars criticized “Chinese substance” as a conservative point of view that only reinforced Chinese Confucian traditions, while others viewed the slogan as an open door for legitimate western studies and a positive step towards China's modernization.

== Debates on Chinese Substance, Western Application ==
=== The Reformists ===
After the First Sino-Japanese War in 1895, the Reformists proposed a new cultural concept of “the Integration of China and the West”, diverting from the original theory of “Chinese Substance, Western Application.” Scholar Yan Fu asserted that "Chinese learning and Western learning both have their unique substance and application. If one treats the Chinese and the Western separately, then they both make sense; if one merges them together, then they both lose their meanings." (中学有中学之体用，西学有西学之体用，分之则并立，合之则两亡). Kang Youwei, Liang Qichao, and other members of the Hundred Days' Reform also broke through the restrictions of “Chinese substance” and strived to adopt the western political systems, industrialization, and capitalism.

=== Liang Shuming’s Refusal of Cultural Blending ===
The Chinese philosopher Liang Shuming (1893–1988) did not agree with “Chinese Substance, Western Application”. To Liang, culture was a holistic expression of one unified underlying human attitude, so he denied an easy blending of Chinese and Western cultures. On one hand, he is a defender of Chinese culture. He believed Chinese and Western cultures were incompatible. Chinese culture is aimed at exploring autonomous moral principles and human nature, whereas the Western essence - the emphasis on liberty and rights - is derived from these particular aspects of human nature or actually belongs to the realm of moral principle.

On the other hand, however, Liang ultimately advocated “a complete acceptance” of Western culture because he believed only Western science and technology could solve the dilemma of China. In his book Eastern and Western Cultures and Their Philosophies(《东西方文化及其哲学》), he argued that if China was going to import Western science and government, it had to import and adopt Western culture as well. The solution with which he concluded his lectures muddled the central issue: to "completely accept Western culture while fundamentally reforming its mistakes".

=== He Lin’s New Interpretation of Substance and Application ===
He Lin (贺麟, 1902–1992) proposed to take Confucianism as the “substance” and Western culture as the “application” in his article New Development of Confucianism《儒家思想的新开展》. He later revised his idea in Cultural Essence and Application《文化的体与用》into that “spiritual and rational thinking” is the “essence” and “all cultures from ancient to modern, from Chinese to foreign” are the “application”. He thought that China should develop Confucian ideas through the study of Western philosophy. He promoted adapting Western art to enrich Confucian aesthetics, learning from Western religion to enhance Confucian ritual habits, and absorbing Taoism, Mohism, Legalism to enrich Confucianism.

He Lin also criticized the so-called "Chinese standard culture theory," advocating that Chinese people should melt the essence of Western philosophy and culture with a broad horizon and a free, independent spirit. He encouraged Chinese people to study and relish the beauty of Western philosophy and digest it into their own ideological achievements. Thus, they could transcend and discard the Western culture and create their own new culture.

== Western Substance, Chinese Application ==
Chinese scholar Li Zehou (李泽厚, 1930- ) wrote the article “Random Thoughts on ‘Western Learning as Substance, Chinese Learning for Application’” (Manshuo 'Xiti zhongyong 漫说“西体中用“) in 1986, turning around “Chinese Learning as Substance, Western Learning for application”. Li Zehou stressed that only the real life of the people, the mode of production and economics could be considered as the "base" (substance). “Substance” is social existence, including material production and spiritual production. Science and technology, which are cornerstones of social development, are therefore part of the “substance”. Chinese “application” not only includes the application of Western “substance” but also that of Chinese traditional culture.

Moreover, in contrast to Zhang Zhidong, for whom ti (base/substance) and yong (function/application) seem to mark two distinct realms, Li Zehou adheres to the traditional (Neo-Confucian) significance of ti and yong: i.e., they are not two different entities/modes but two aspects of the same issue (ti yong bu er “体用不二”) – they cannot be separated into two, which means in his context, modernization is sinification.

=== Criticism ===
Fang Keli (方克立, 1938- ) criticized Li's idea as “old formula only in a new cloak.” Chinese writer Liu Xiaobo condemned Li Zehou because of the latter's advocacy of Confucian ethics and the aesthetics of tianren heyi (the unification of heaven and human). For Liu, beauty resides not in harmony but in conflicts. To reconstruct Chinese national character, Liu insists that we negate thoroughly the three primary theoretical paradigms underlying traditional culture: the Confucian democratic model of minben (for the people), the model personality of Confucius and Yanhui, and the concept of tianren heyi (unification between heaven and humans) "Explicitly placing himself in the tradition of those Chinese modernizers who advocated 'total Westernization'", Liu "accused Li Zehou of trying to revive the 'rationalistic' and 'despotic' Chinese tradition," as scholar Woei Lien Chong explains.

== The Spirit of Marxism, the System of China and the Application of the West ==
Chinese philosopher Zhang Dainian (张岱年, 1909–2004) was an opponent of the "Chinese Substance, Western Application" in the 1930s. He thought this idea misleadingly framed Chinese learning as in opposition to Western learning. In 1987, Zhang introduced the idea of "cultural view of comprehensive innovation". He proposed that “the Chinese nation is the main body of building a new socialist Chinese culture, and socialism is the guiding principle of China's new culture. Science and technology are all serving the main body of this nation, and they all serve socialism."

Fang Keli came up with the idea of “the spirit of Marxism, the system of China and the application of the West” (“马魂中体西用”) in 1988. He tried to unify Chinese learning, western learning, and Marxism, using Marxism as the guideline with the subjectivity of Chinese national culture. Deepening the studies of “cultural view of comprehensive innovation”, Fang exerted a more positive effort on the “New Cultural Construction of Socialism with Chinese Characteristics”. “The spirit of Marxism" and "the application of the West" should be organically combined with "Chinese essence".

== Related Social events ==
=== The Taiping Rebellion ===
In the 19th century, the Taiping Rebellion was seen as an example of a negative sinification of "Western learning". The Taiping Rebellion can be seen, in parts, as a heretic Christian group, but also as a proto-communist peasant militia based on the Western value of "equality".

=== Hundred Days' Reform of 1898 ===
Reformers around Kang Youwei attempted institutional and educational reforms according to Western models but with explicit reference to the Confucian tradition, in fact by claiming that reforms were the original agenda of Confucius.

=== May Fourth Movement ===
Leading figures such as Cai Yuanpei wanted to open up the new tradition (Marxism) and sought for a harmony between the Chinese cultural tradition and new “Western Learning”. Radical liberals of the May Fourth Movement rejected the tradition – both the old (Confucianism) as well as the new tradition (Marxism), demanding "complete Westernization", in a new guise.

== See also ==
- Eastward spread of Western learning
- Essence-Function (體用)
- 东学西渐
- 西学东渐

== Bibliography ==
- Li, Lin (2012), "Disciplinization of History Education in Modern China: A Study of History Education in the Imperial University of Peking (1898-1911)", Creative Education, vol. 3, no. 4.
- Pohl, Karl-Heinz. "’Western Learning for Substance, Chinese Learning for Application’ – Li Zehou’s Thought on Tradition and Modernity." In Li Zehou and Confucian philosophy, ed.Ames, Roger T, and Jinhua Jia. Honolulu Hawaii, University of Hawaii press, 2018.
- Xue, Huayuan (1991). 晚淸"中体西用"思想论(1861-1900). 臺北 : 稻鄉出版社.
- Zhang, Zhidong (1898). 劝学篇.
- Ding, Weizhi (2007). “中体西用”论在戊戌维新时期的嬗变, 中华文史网.
- Yan, Fu (1902).与<外交报>主人书.
- Alitto, Guy (1979). The last Confucian : Liang Shu-ming and the Chinese Dilemma of Modernity. Berkeley : University of California Press. ISBN 9780520031234.
- Ip, Hung-Yok (1991). "Liang Shuming and the Idea of Democracy in Modern China", Modern China, vol. 17 no. 4
- Du, Yunhui (2014). 张岱年文化哲学研究. Beijing Book Co. Inc.
- He, Lin (1990). 文化与人生. 商务印书馆.
- Li, Zehou (2000), "The Western is the Substance, and the Chinese is for Application", Comptemporary Chinese Thought, vol. 31, no. 2.
- Zhang, Dainian (1996), "试谈文化的体用问题", 《张岱年全集》, vol. 6.
- Fang, Keli. ""Ping 'Zhongti Xiyong' he 'Xiti Zhongyong'" 评'中体西用'和'西体中用' (A critique of 'Chinese learning as Substance, Western learning for application' and of 'Western learning for substance, Chinese learning for application') in Zhang Liwen 张立文 et al. (eds), Chuantong wenhua yu xiandaihua 传统文化与现 代化 (Traditional culture and modernization), Peking, 1987.
- Fang, Keli (2017), ""马魂中体西用"与文化体用问题", 环球视野.
- Fang, Keli, "Fang Keli", 中国社会科学院. Fang Keli
