= Eastward spread of Western learning =

Spread of Western technologies and ideologies in China

The eastward spread of Western learning (simplified Chinese: 西学东渐; traditional Chinese: 西學東漸) refers to the spread of Western technologies and ideologies in China since the late Ming dynasty, which is contrast with the westward spread of Eastern learning (simplified Chinese: 东学西传; traditional Chinese: 東學西傳) that introduced Chinese technologies and ideologies to the West.

== Naming ==
The term "Western learning" (simplified Chinese: 西学; traditional Chinese: 西學) was coined by the Jesuit missionaries to China, who used the phrase in their book titles, such as Julius Aleni’s Summary of Western Learning, to refer to the knowledge they brought from the West. According to Liang Qichao, Western learning consists of an extremely wide range of topics including mathematics, mechanics, electrical science, chemistry, acoustics, optics, astronomy, geology, medical science, history, geography, legal studies, mining, military strategy and knowledge. Since the late Qing period, Chinese researchers began to review and detailedly describe the process during which the Western knowledge was brought into China. In the 1900s, the term "eastward spread of Western learning" was coined in Shanghai-based newspaper Shun Pao, as a description of the emerging national awareness among the Chinese people as a result of prevailing Western influences in China. In 1915, the Chinese translation of Yung Wing's autobiography My Life in China and America, which used the term in its Chinese title, further popularized the use of the term. Since the 1980s, the term has frequently appeared in various scholarly articles to describe the spread of Western technologies and ideologies in China.

== History ==
=== Jesuit China missions ===
Before the industrial revolution, China had been the most powerful and prosperous country in the world. However, the direct contact of Chinese and Western civilizations did not occur until the arrival of Jesuit missionaries in China in 1600. While bringing back Chinese philosophies, especially Confucianism, to the Enlightenment Europe, these missionaries were the pioneers of spreading Western civilization to China. According to the Chinese encyclopedia Complete Library of the Four Treasuries, Qiankun Tiyi [Explication of the Structure of Heaven and Earth] by Matteo Ricci was the first book that introduced Western learning to China. The mission was widely regarded the first wave of the eastward spread of Western learning.

With the popularization of Christianity in China, the increasing Western knowledge in China contributed to the rise of Shixue (simplified Chinese: 实学; traditional Chinese: 實學), which focused more on practice and evidence. The scholars of Shixue reshaped the school education with the introduction of mathematics in addition to the traditional Four Books and Five Classics. However, this trend was halted when Kangxi Emperor of Qing decided to ban the religion due to the religion's lack of respect to Chinese rites in 1717. Subsequently, the Roman Catholic Church canceled the Jesuit mission to China in 1773.

=== Late Qing period and Republican era ===
The British invasion of China in the 1840s forced China to open up to the world, which led to the second wave of the eastward spread of Western learning. The failures of two Opium Wars stimulated the Chinese government to absorb Western learning. During the process, the Chinese gradually reduced their resistance the Western learning and gradually adopted the Western learning, with the principle of "Chinese Learning as Substance, Western Learning for Application." Under this principle, more focus was given to the Western weapon and machine. Meanwhile, missionaries in China continued to spread Western ideologies in China.

As China was defeated by Japan in the First Sino-Japanese War in 1897, Chinese thought leaders began to seek ways to save China from elimination, which drove them to active seek and absorb Western knowledge and demanded political reforms. Japan became a new source of Western learning during the time.

Since the late Qing dynasty, government-funded overseas Chinese students contributed to this movement, contributing to the criticism of traditional Chinese culture and the modernization of China, especially during the New Culture Movement. One of the result of the movement is the Sinicization of Western ideologies including Marxism. As a reflection on the century of humiliation that China had undergone, which was characterized by foreign concessions in China, and the success of Meiji Restoration of Japan, the Chinese people began calling for a full-scale westernization of China and debated with those who defended the traditional Chinese culture.

== See also ==
- Chinese Learning as Substance, Western Learning for Application
- Total Westernization
