= May 4 =

May 4 this year in various calendars
- Monday, 4 May 2026
| Akan | Monodwo |
| Armenian | 18 Mareri 1475 |
| Aztec | Xocotlhuetzi 14, 11 Ehēcatl |
| Babylonian | 16 Nisanu, 2337 SE |
| Balinese pawukon | Luang, Pepet, Kajeng, Laba, Umanis, Maulu, Coma of Taulu, Brahma, Dadi, Raksasa |
| Bengali | 21 Boisakh, BS 1433 |
| Chinese | Yang Earth Tiger・Heart Mansion; Fire Horse Year, Month 3, Day 18 (Guyu, 1 day until Lixia) |
| Common Era | 4 May 2026 CE |
| Coptic | 26 Parmouti, AM 1742 |
| Egyptian | 18 Thoth, 2775 NE |
| Ethiopian | 26 Miyāzyā, 2018 Amätä Məhrät |
| French Republican | Décade II, Quintidi de Floréal de l'Année 234 de la République |
| Gregorian | 4 May, AD 2026 |
| Hebrew | 17 Iyar, AM 5786; Omer 32 |
| Hindu | Anurādhā・Parigha; Solar: 21 Vaiśākha, 1948 SE; Lunisolar: Tr̥tīyā, Kṛishna pakṣa of Vaiśākha, 2083 VE; Rāudra・5127 KY・1,872,699 |
| Icelandic | Mánudagur, 12 Harpa 2026 |
| Islamic | 17 Dhu al-Qi'dah, AH 1447 (using tabular method) |
| ISO week date | 2026-W19-1 |
| Japanese | 18 Yayoi, Reiwa 8 (Kokuu, 1 day until Rikka) |
| Julian | 21 April, AD 2026 (AM 7534) |
| Julian day | 2461165 |
| Korean | 18 Yongdal, 4359 DE |
| Maya | 13.0.13.10.2; 15 Uo, 11 Ik |
| Roman | ante diem XI Kalendas Maias, MMDCCLXXIX AUC |
| Solar Hijri | 14 Ordibehesht, SH 1405 |
| Tibetan | 18 nag pa, me pho rta 2153 or 1772 or 1000 |

| << | May | | | | | >> |
| Su | Mo | Tu | We | Th | Fr | Sa |
| | | | | | 1 | 2 |
| 3 | 4 | 5 | 6 | 7 | 8 | 9 |
| 10 | 11 | 12 | 13 | 14 | 15 | 16 |
| 17 | 18 | 19 | 20 | 21 | 22 | 23 |
| 24 | 25 | 26 | 27 | 28 | 29 | 30 |
| 31 |
2026

May 4 in recent years
2026 (Monday)
2025 (Sunday)
2024 (Saturday)
2023 (Thursday)
2022 (Wednesday)
2021 (Tuesday)
2020 (Monday)
2019 (Saturday)
2018 (Friday)
2017 (Thursday)

May 4 is the 124th day of the year (125th in leap years) in the Gregorian calendar; 241 days remain until the end of the year.

== Events ==
=== Pre-1600 ===
- 1256 – The Augustinian monastic order is constituted at the Lecceto Monastery when Pope Alexander IV issues a papal bull Licet ecclesiae catholicae.
- 1415 – Religious reformer John Wycliffe is condemned as a heretic at the Council of Constance.
- 1436 – Assassination of the Swedish rebel (later national hero) Engelbrekt Engelbrektsson (27 April O.S.).
- 1471 – Wars of the Roses: The Battle of Tewkesbury: Edward IV defeats a Lancastrian Army and kills Edward of Westminster, Prince of Wales.
- 1493 – In the papal bull Inter caetera, Pope Alexander VI divides the New World between Spain and Portugal along the Line of Demarcation.

=== 1601–1900 ===
- 1626 – Having been appointed the director-general of New Netherland, Dutch explorer Peter Minuit arrives in present day Manhattan Island aboard the See Meeuw.
- 1738 – The Imperial Theatrical School, the first ballet school in Russia, is founded.
- 1776 – Rhode Island becomes the first American colony to renounce allegiance to King George III.
- 1799 – Fourth Anglo-Mysore War: The Battle of Seringapatam: The siege of Seringapatam ends when the city is invaded and Tipu Sultan killed by the besieging British army, under the command of General George Harris.
- 1814 – Emperor Napoleon arrives at Portoferraio on the island of Elba to begin his exile.
- 1814 – King Ferdinand VII abolishes the Spanish Constitution of 1812, returning Spain to absolutism.
- 1823 – Brazilian War of Independence: A Brazilian squadron led by Lord Cochrane engages a Portuguese squadron under João de Campos off Salvador, Bahia.
- 1836 – Formation of Ancient Order of Hibernians.
- 1859 – The Cornwall Railway opens across the Royal Albert Bridge linking Devon and Cornwall in England.
- 1869 – The four-day Naval Battle of Hakodate begins. The newly formed Imperial Japanese Navy defeats the remnants of the Tokugawa shogunate navy in the Sea of Japan off the city of Hakodate, leading to the surrender of the Ezo Republic on May 17.
- 1871 – The National Association, the first professional baseball league, opens its first season in Fort Wayne, Indiana.
- 1886 – Haymarket affair: In Chicago, United States, a homemade bomb is thrown at police officers trying to break up a labor rally, killing one officer. Ensuing gunfire leads to the deaths of a further seven officers and four civilians.

=== 1901–present ===
- 1904 – The United States begins construction of the Panama Canal.
- 1910 – The Royal Canadian Navy is created.
- 1912 – Italy begins the invasion and occupation of the Ottoman island of Rhodes.
- 1919 – May Fourth Movement: Student demonstrations take place in Tiananmen Square in Beijing, China, protesting the Treaty of Versailles, which transferred Chinese territory to Japan.
- 1926 – The United Kingdom general strike begins.
- 1927 – The Academy of Motion Picture Arts and Sciences is incorporated.
- 1932 – Having been incarcerated at the Cook County Jail since his sentencing on October 24, 1931, mobster Al Capone is transferred to the federal penitentiary in Atlanta after the U.S. Supreme Court denies his appeal for conviction of tax evasion.
- 1942 – World War II: The Battle of the Coral Sea begins with an attack by aircraft from the United States aircraft carrier USS Yorktown on Japanese naval forces at Tulagi Island in the Solomon Islands. The Japanese forces had invaded Tulagi the day before.
- 1945 – World War II: Neuengamme concentration camp near Hamburg is liberated by the British Army.
- 1945 – World War II: The German surrender at Lüneburg Heath is signed, coming into effect the following day. It encompasses all Wehrmacht units in the Netherlands, Denmark and northwest Germany.
- 1946 – In San Francisco Bay, U.S. Marines from the nearby Treasure Island Naval Base stop a two-day riot at Alcatraz Federal Penitentiary. Five people are killed in the riot.
- 1949 – The entire Torino football team (except for two players who did not take the trip: Sauro Tomà, due to an injury and Renato Gandolfi, because of coach request) is killed in a plane crash.
- 1953 – Ernest Hemingway wins the Pulitzer Prize for The Old Man and the Sea.
- 1959 – The 1st Annual Grammy Awards are held.
- 1961 – American civil rights movement: The "Freedom Riders" begin a bus trip through the South.
- 1961 – Malcolm Ross and Victor Prather attain a new altitude record for manned balloon flight ascending in the Strato-Lab V open gondola to 113,740 feet (34.67 km).
- 1970 – Vietnam War: Kent State shootings: The Ohio National Guard, sent to Kent State University after disturbances in the city of Kent the weekend before, opens fire killing four unarmed students and wounding nine others. The students were protesting the Cambodian Campaign of the United States and South Vietnam.
- 1972 – The Don't Make A Wave Committee, a fledgling environmental organization founded in Canada in 1971, officially changes its name to Greenpeace Foundation.
- 1973 – The 108-story Sears Tower in Chicago is topped out at 1,451 feet (442 m) as the world's tallest building.
- 1978 – The South African Defence Force attacks a SWAPO base at Cassinga in southern Angola, killing about 600 people.
- 1979 – Margaret Thatcher becomes the first female Prime Minister of the United Kingdom.
- 1982 – Twenty sailors are killed when the British Type 42 destroyer HMS Sheffield is hit by an Argentinian Exocet missile during the Falklands War.
- 1988 – The PEPCON disaster rocks Henderson, Nevada, as tons of Space Shuttle fuel detonate during a fire.
- 1989 – Iran–Contra affair: Former White House aide Oliver North is convicted of three crimes and acquitted of nine other charges; the convictions are later overturned on appeal.
- 1989 – Space Shuttle Atlantis launches on mission STS-30 to deploy the Venus-bound Magellan space probe.
- 1990 – Latvia declares independence from the Soviet Union.
- 1994 – Israeli Prime Minister Yitzhak Rabin and PLO leader Yasser Arafat sign a peace accord, granting self-rule in the Gaza Strip and Jericho.
- 1998 – A federal judge in Sacramento, California, gives "Unabomber" Theodore Kaczynski four life sentences plus 30 years after Kaczynski accepts a plea agreement sparing him from the death penalty.
- 2000 – Ken Livingstone becomes the first Mayor of London (an office separate from that of the Lord Mayor of London).
- 2002 – One hundred three people are killed and 51 are injured in a plane crash near Mallam Aminu Kano International Airport in Kano, Nigeria.
- 2007 – Greensburg, Kansas is almost completely destroyed by the 2007 Greensburg tornado, a 1.7-mile wide EF5 tornado. It was the first-ever tornado to be rated with the new Enhanced Fujita scale.
- 2014 – Three people are killed and 62 injured in a pair of bombings on buses in Nairobi, Kenya.
- 2019 – The inaugural all-female motorsport series, W Series, takes place at Hockenheimring. The race was won by Jamie Chadwick, who would go on to become the inaugural series champion.
- 2023 – Nine people are killed and thirteen injured in a spree shooting in Mladenovac and Smederevo, Serbia. It is the second mass shooting in the country in two days.

== Births ==
=== Pre-1600 ===
- 1006 – Khwaja Abdullah Ansari, Persian mystic and poet (died 1088)
- 1559 – Alice Spencer, English noblewoman (died 1637)

=== 1601–1900 ===
- 1634 – Katherine Ferrers, English aristocrat and heiress (died 1660)
- 1649 – Chhatrasal, Indian ruler (died 1731)
- 1655 – Bartolomeo Cristofori, Italian instrument maker, invented the piano (died 1731)
- 1677 – Françoise-Marie de Bourbon, French noblewoman (died 1749)
- 1715 – Richard Graves, English minister and author (died 1804)
- 1733 – Jean-Charles de Borda, French mathematician, physicist, and sailor (died 1799)
- 1752 – John Brooks, American soldier and politician, 11th Governor of Massachusetts (died 1825)
- 1757 – Manuel Tolsá, Spanish sculptor and first director of the Academy of San Carlos in Mexico City (died 1816)
- 1767 – Tyagaraja, Indian composer (died 1847)
- 1770 – François Gérard, French painter (died 1837)
- 1772 – Friedrich Arnold Brockhaus, German publisher (died 1823)
- 1796 – Horace Mann, American educator and politician (died 1859)
- 1796 – William Pennington, American lawyer and politician, 13th Governor of New Jersey, 23rd Speaker of the United States House of Representatives (died 1862)
- 1796 – William H. Prescott, American historian and scholar (died 1859)
- 1820 – Julia Gardiner Tyler, American wife of John Tyler, 11th First Lady of the United States (died 1889)
- 1820 – John Whiteaker, American soldier, judge, and politician, 1st Governor of Oregon (died 1902)
- 1822 – Charles Boucher de Boucherville, Canadian physician and politician, 3rd Premier of Quebec (died 1915)
- 1825 – Thomas Henry Huxley, English biologist, anatomist, and academic (died 1895)
- 1825 – Augustus Le Plongeon, English-American historian, photographer, and academic (died 1908)
- 1826 – Frederic Edwin Church, American painter (died 1900)
- 1827 – John Hanning Speke, English soldier and explorer (died 1864)
- 1843 – Bianka Blume, German opera singer (died 1896)
- 1851 – Thomas Dewing, American painter (died 1938)
- 1852 – Alice Liddell, English model (died 1934)
- 1883 – Wang Jingwei, Chinese politician (died 1944)
- 1884 – Richard Baggallay, English army officer and cricketer (died 1975)
- 1887 – Andrew Dasburg, French-American painter (died 1979)
- 1889 – Francis Spellman, American cardinal (died 1967)
- 1890 – Franklin Carmichael, Canadian painter (died 1945)
- 1898 – Umm Kulthum, Egyptian singer-songwriter and actress, known as Kawkab al-Sharq, Star of the East (died 1975)

=== 1901–present ===
- 1902 – Ronnie Aird, English cricketer and administrator (died 1986)
- 1903 – Luther Adler, American actor (died 1984)
- 1907 – Lincoln Kirstein, American soldier and playwright, co-founded the New York City Ballet (died 1996)
- 1913 – Princess Katherine of Greece and Denmark (died 2007)
- 1914 – Maedayama Eigorō, Japanese sumo wrestler, the 39th Yokozuna (died 1971)
- 1916 – Jane Jacobs, American-Canadian journalist, author, and activist (died 2006)
- 1917 – Nick Joaquin, Filipino writer, journalist and historian (died 2004)
- 1918 – Kakuei Tanaka, Japanese soldier and politician, 64th Prime Minister of Japan (died 1993)
- 1921 – Edo Murtić, Croatian painter, sculptor, and illustrator (died 2005)
- 1922 – Eugenie Clark, American biologist and academic (died 2015)
- 1923 – Eric Sykes, British actor and comedian (died 2012)
- 1925 – Maurice R. Greenberg, American businessman and philanthropist
- 1928 – Maynard Ferguson, Canadian trumpet player and bandleader (died 2006)
- 1928 – Hosni Mubarak, Egyptian air marshal and politician, 4th President of Egypt (died 2020)
- 1928 – Betsy Rawls, American golfer (died 2023)
- 1929 – Manuel Contreras, Chilean general (died 2015)
- 1929 – Audrey Hepburn, Belgian-British actress and humanitarian (died 1993)
- 1930 – Katherine Jackson, matriarch of the Jackson family
- 1932 – Harlon Hill, American football player and coach (died 2013)
- 1937 – Ron Carter, American bassist and educator
- 1937 – Dick Dale, American surf-rock guitarist, singer, and songwriter (died 2019)
- 1938 – Carlos Monsiváis, Mexican journalist, author, and critic (died 2010)
- 1939 – Amos Oz, Israeli journalist and author (died 2018)
- 1940 – Robin Cook, American physician and author
- 1941 – George Will, American journalist and author
- 1943 – Georgi Asparuhov, Bulgarian footballer (died 1971)
- 1944 – Russi Taylor, American voice actress (died 2019)
- 1945 – Robert Machray, American actor (died 2025)
- 1946 – John Barnard, English car designer
- 1946 – Gary Bauer, American political activist
- 1946 – John Watson, British race car driver
- 1948 – King George Tupou V of Tonga (died 2012)
- 1949 – John Force, an American NHRA drag racer
- 1949 – Graham Swift, British author
- 1951 – Colin Bass, English bass player, songwriter, and producer
- 1951 – Colleen Hanabusa, American lawyer and politician
- 1951 – Jackie Jackson, American singer-songwriter and dancer
- 1952 – Belinda Green, Australian beauty queen and 1972 Miss World
- 1953 – Pia Zadora, American actress and singer
- 1954 – Ryan Cayabyab, Filipino pianist, composer, and conductor
- 1956 – David Guterson, American author
- 1956 – Sharon Jones, American soul singer (died 2016)
- 1956 – Ken Oberkfell, American baseball player and coach
- 1957 – Kathy Kreiner, Canadian skier
- 1957 – Soozie Tyrell, American musician
- 1958 – Keith Haring, American painter (died 1990)
- 1958 – Caroline Spelman, English politician, Secretary of State for Environment, Food and Rural Affairs
- 1959 – Randy Travis, American singer-songwriter, guitarist, and actor
- 1960 – Werner Faymann, Austrian politician, 28th Chancellor of Austria
- 1961 – Jay Aston, English singer-songwriter and dancer
- 1967 – Kate Garraway, English journalist
- 1967 – Ana Gasteyer, American actress and singer
- 1970 – Will Arnett, Canadian actor and producer
- 1970 – Dawn Staley, American basketball player
- 1972 – Mike Dirnt, American bass player and songwriter
- 1972 – Chris Tomlin, American singer-songwriter
- 1973 – Guillermo Barros Schelotto, Argentinian footballer and coach
- 1973 – John Madden, Canadian ice hockey player and coach
- 1974 – Tony McCoy, Northern Irish jockey and sportscaster
- 1975 – Kimora Lee Simmons, American model
- 1977 - Emily Perkins, Canadian actress
- 1978 – Erin Andrews, American sportscaster and journalist
- 1978 – Igor Biscan, Croatian footballer and manager
- 1978 – James Harrison, American football player
- 1979 – Lance Bass, American singer, dancer, and producer
- 1979 – Lesley Vainikolo, Tongan rugby player
- 1980 – Andrew Raycroft, Canadian ice hockey player
- 1981 – Eric Djemba-Djemba, Cameroon footballer
- 1981 – Ruth Negga, Ethiopian-Irish actress
- 1981 – Dallon Weekes, American singer-songwriter and musician
- 1983 – Derek Roy, Canadian ice hockey player
- 1984 – Brad Maddox, American wrestler and referee
- 1985 – Ravi Bopara, English cricketer
- 1985 – Fernandinho, Brazilian footballer
- 1985 – Jamie Adenuga, English MC and rapper
- 1986 – Devan Dubnyk, Canadian ice hockey player
- 1986 – George Hill, American basketball player
- 1987 – Cesc Fàbregas, Spanish footballer and manager
- 1987 – Jorge Lorenzo, Spanish motorcycle racer
- 1988 – Radja Nainggolan, Belgian footballer
- 1989 – Rory McIlroy, Northern Irish golfer
- 1989 – James van Riemsdyk, American ice hockey player
- 1991 – Brianne Jenner, Canadian women's ice hockey player
- 1992 – Victor Oladipo, American basketball player
- 1994 – Abi Masatora, Japanese sumo wrestler
- 1994 – Joseph Tapine, New Zealand rugby league player
- 1995 – Shameik Moore, American actor and musician
- 1998 – Rex Orange County, English musician
- 2001 – Noah Beck, American media personality and actor
- 2001 – Joan García, Spanish footballer

== Deaths ==
=== Pre-1600 ===
- 408 – Venerius, archbishop of Milan
- 784 – Arbeo, bishop of Freising
- 1003 – Herman II, duke of Swabia
- 1038 – Gotthard of Hildesheim, German bishop (born 960)
- 1406 – Coluccio Salutati, chancellor of Florence (born 1331)
- 1436 – Engelbrekt Engelbrektsson, Swedish rebel leader (27 April O.S.).
- 1471 – Edward of Westminster, Prince of Wales, son and heir of Henry VI of England (born 1453)
- 1483 – George Neville, Duke of Bedford (born 1457)
- 1506 – Husayn Mirza Bayqara, Timurid ruler of Herat (born 1438)
- 1519 – Lorenzo de' Medici, duke of Urbino (born 1492)
- 1535 – John Houghton, Carthusian monk and saint
- 1562 – Lelio Sozzini, Italian Protestant theologian (born 1525)
- 1566 – Luca Ghini, Italian physician and botanist (born 1490)
- 1571 – Pierre Viret, Swiss theologian and reformer (born 1511)

=== 1601–1900 ===
- 1604 – Claudio Merulo, Italian organist and composer (born 1533)
- 1605 – Ulisse Aldrovandi, Italian naturalist (born 1522)
- 1615 – Adriaan van Roomen, Flemish priest and mathematician (born 1561)
- 1626 – Arthur Lake, English bishop and scholar (born 1569)
- 1677 – Isaac Barrow, English mathematician and theologian (born 1630)
- 1684 – John Nevison, English criminal (born 1639)
- 1729 – Louis Antoine de Noailles, French cardinal (born 1651)
- 1734 – James Thornhill, English painter and politician (born 1675)
- 1737 – Eustace Budgell, English journalist and politician (born 1686)
- 1774 – Anthony Ulrich of Brunswick, Prussian nobleman (born 1714)
- 1776 – Jacques Saly, French painter and sculptor (born 1717)
- 1790 – Matthew Tilghman, American politician (born 1718)
- 1799 – Tipu, ruler of Mysore (born 1750)
- 1811 – Nikolay Kamensky, Russian general (born 1776)
- 1816 – Samuel Dexter, American lawyer and politician, 4th United States Secretary of War, 3rd United States Secretary of the Treasury (born 1761)
- 1824 – Joseph Joubert, French author (born 1754)
- 1826 – Sebastián Kindelán y O'Regan, colonial governor of East Florida, Santo Domingo and Cuba (born 1757)
- 1839 – Denis Davydov, Russian general and poet (born 1784)
- 1859 – Joseph Diaz Gergonne, French mathematician and philosopher (born 1771)
- 1880 – Edward Clark, American lawyer and politician, 8th Governor of Texas (born 1815)

=== 1901–present ===
- 1901 – John Jones Ross, Canadian lawyer and politician, 7th Premier of Quebec (born 1831)
- 1903 – Gotse Delchev, Macedonian Bulgarian revolutionary IMRO (born 1872)
- 1912 – Nettie Stevens, American geneticist credited with discovering sex chromosomes (born 1861)
- 1916 - Executions of the leaders of the Easter Uprising
  - Ned Daly, Irish rebel commander (born 1891)
  - Michael O'Hanrahan, Irish rebel (born 1877)
  - Willie Pearse, Irish rebel (born 1881)
  - Joseph Plunkett, Irish rebel and writer (born 1887)
- 1916 – John Murray, Australian politician, 23rd Premier of Victoria (born 1851)
- 1919 – Milan Rastislav Štefánik, Slovak general and politician (born 1880)
- 1922 – Viktor Kingissepp, Estonian politician (born 1888)
- 1923 – Ralph McKittrick, American golfer and tennis player (born 1877)
- 1924 – E. Nesbit, English author and poet (born 1858)
- 1937 – Gina Oselio, Norwegian opera singer (born 1858).
- 1938 – Kanō Jigorō, Japanese founder of judo (born 1860)
- 1938 – Carl von Ossietzky, German journalist and activist, Nobel Prize laureate (born 1889)
- 1941 – Chris McKivat, Australian rugby player and coach (born 1880)
- 1945 – Fedor von Bock, German field marshal (born 1880)
- 1953 – Alexandre Pharamond, French rugby player (born 1876)
- 1955 – George Enescu, Romanian pianist, composer, and conductor (born 1881)
- 1964 – Karl Robert Pusta, Estonian politician, 4th Estonian Minister of Foreign Affairs (born 1883)
- 1969 – Osbert Sitwell, English-Italian author and poet (born 1892)
- 1971 – William Brown Meloney, writer and theatrical producer (born 1902)
- 1972 – Father Chrysanthus, Dutch arachnologist (born 1905)
- 1972 – Edward Calvin Kendall, American chemist and academic, Nobel Prize laureate (born 1886)
- 1973 – Jane Bowles, American author and playwright (born 1917)
- 1975 – Moe Howard, American actor, singer, and screenwriter (born 1897)
- 1980 – Josip Broz Tito, Yugoslav field marshal and politician, 1st President of Yugoslavia (born 1892)
- 1980 – Joe "Mr Piano" Henderson, Scottish pianist and composer (born 1920)
- 1983 – Nino Sanzogno, Italian conductor and composer (born 1911)
- 1984 – Diana Dors, English actress (born 1931)
- 1985 – Fikri Sönmez, Turkish tailor and politician (born 1938)
- 1985 – Clarence Wiseman, English-Canadian 10th General of The Salvation Army (born 1907)
- 1987 – Paul Butterfield, American singer and harmonica player (born 1942)
- 1987 – Cathryn Damon, American actress (born 1930)
- 1988 – Lillian Estelle Fisher, American historian of Spanish America (born 1891)
- 1990 – Emily Remler, American guitarist (born 1957)
- 1991 – Mohammed Abdel Wahab, Egyptian singer-songwriter and mandolin player (born 1902)
- 1992 – Gregor Mackenzie, Scottish politician (born 1927)
- 1993 – France Štiglic, Slovenian film director and screenwriter (born 1919)
- 1995 – Connie Wisniewski, American baseball player (born 1922)
- 1998 – Christine Kurzhals, German politician (born 1950)
- 2000 – Hendrik Casimir, Dutch physicist and academic (born 1909)
- 2001 – Bonnie Lee Bakley, American model, wife of Robert Blake (born 1956)
- 2004 – David Reimer, Canadian man, born male but reassigned female and raised as a girl after a botched circumcision (born 1965)
- 2005 – David Hackworth, American colonel and journalist (born 1930)
- 2008 – Fred Baur, American chemist and founder of Pringles (born 1918)
- 2009 – Dom DeLuise, American actor, director, and producer (born 1933)
- 2011 – Sammy McCrory, Northern Irish footballer (born 1924)
- 2012 – Mort Lindsey, American pianist, composer, and conductor (born 1923)
- 2012 – Bob Stewart, American television producer, founded Stewart Tele Enterprises (born 1920)
- 2012 – Adam Yauch, American rapper and director (born 1964)
- 2012 – Rashidi Yekini, Nigerian footballer (born 1963)
- 2013 – Otis Bowen, American physician and politician, 44th Governor of Indiana (born 1918)
- 2013 – Christian de Duve, English-Belgian cytologist and biochemist, Nobel Prize laureate (born 1917)
- 2013 – Javier Diez Canseco, Peruvian sociologist and politician (born 1948)
- 2013 – Mario Machado, Chinese-American journalist and actor (born 1935)
- 2013 – Morgan Morgan-Giles, English admiral and politician (born 1914)
- 2013 – César Portillo de la Luz, Cuban guitarist and composer (born 1922)
- 2014 – Dick Ayers, American author and illustrator (born 1924)
- 2014 – Elena Baltacha, Ukrainian-Scottish tennis player (born 1983)
- 2014 – Edgar Cortright, American scientist and engineer (born 1923)
- 2014 – Helga Königsdorf, German physicist and author (born 1938)
- 2014 – Ross Lonsberry, Canadian-American ice hockey player (born 1947)
- 2014 – Jean-Paul Ngoupandé, Central African politician, Prime Minister of the Central African Republic (born 1948)
- 2015 – William Bast, American screenwriter and author (born 1931)
- 2015 – Ellen Albertini Dow, American actress (born 1913)
- 2015 – Marv Hubbard, American football player (born 1946)
- 2016 – Jean-Baptiste Bagaza, Burundian politician (born 1946)
- 2019 – Alia Abdulnoor, Emirati imprisoned woman (born 1977)
- 2020 – Don Shula, American football player and coach (born 1930)
- 2020 – Greg Zanis, American carpenter and activist (born 1950)
- 2021 – Nick Kamen, English model, songwriter (born 1962)
- 2024 – Tekin Kartal, Kurdish drug trafficker and gangster (born 1990)
- 2024 – Ron Kavana, Irish singer, songwriter, guitarist and band leader (born 1950)
- 2024 – Frank Stella, American painter (born 1936)

== Holidays and observances ==
- Anti-Bullying Day (United Nations)
- Bird Day (United States)
- Cassinga Day (Namibia)
- Christian feast day:
  - Blessed Ceferino Giménez Malla
  - Blessed Michał Giedroyć
  - English Saints and Martyrs of the Reformation Era (Church of England)
  - F. C. D. Wyneken (Lutheran Church–Missouri Synod)
  - Florian
  - Jean-Martin Moye
  - John Houghton, Robert Lawrence and Augustine Webster
  - Judas Cyriacus
  - Monica of Hippo (1960 Roman Catholic Calendar)
  - Silvanus of Gaza
  - May 4 (Eastern Orthodox liturgics)
- Coal Miners Day (India)
- Dave Brubeck Day (United States)
- Death of Milan Rastislav Štefánik Day (Slovakia)
- Greenery Day (Japan)
- International Firefighters' Day
- May Fourth Movement commemorations:
  - Literary Day (Republic of China)
  - Youth Day (China)
- Remembrance Day for Martyrs and Disabled (Afghanistan)
- Remembrance of the Dead (Netherlands)
- Restoration of Independence Day (Latvia)
- Star Wars Day (International observance)
- Youth Day (Fiji)
