= Cao Rulin =

Chinese politician (1877–1966)

- 曹汝霖
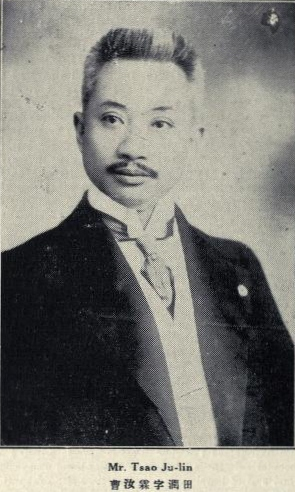

Personal details
- Born: January 23, 1877 Shanghai, China
- Died: August 4, 1966 (aged 89) Detroit, Michigan
- Occupation: Lawyer

Chinese name
- Chinese: 曹汝霖
Transcriptions
Standard Mandarin
- Hanyu Pinyin: Cáo Rǔlín
- Wade–Giles: Ts'ao^{2} Ju^{3}lin^{2}
Wu
- Wugniu: Zau^{6} Lu^{3}lin^{6}

Cao Rulin (Chinese: 曹汝霖; January 23, 1877 – August 4, 1966) was Vice-Minister of Foreign Affairs of the Beiyang Government, and an important member of the pro-Japanese movement in the early 20th century.

== Biography ==
Cao Rulin was born in Shanghai on January 23, 1877. The son of a scholar, he was given an education in the Chinese classics. From 1899 to 1904, Cao studied law in Japan, first at Waseda University, and then Chuo University. Upon returning to China, he passed his examination and received his law degree from the Qing government.

In 1913, he worked as a lawyer working in Beijing when he was appointed by the provisional president, Yuan Shikai, to a vacant seat in the National Assembly's senate. He represented Outer Mongolia because Mongolia boycotted the elections after declaring independence during the Xinhai Revolution. In 1915, he took Yuan Shikai's orders and signed the infamous "Twenty-One Demands" treaty with Japan. He later became the leader of the New Communications Clique.

Cao Rulin was part of the Chinese envoy attending the Paris Peace Conference. At the conference many former German concessions in China were handed to Japan instead of back to China. This was widely unpopular in China, leading to student protests and a broader Chinese cultural and anti-imperialist movement known as the May Fourth Movement.

On May 4, 1919, students across Beijing gathered in front of Tiananmen. Among their demands was the resignation of Cao and two other Chinese officials (Zhang Zongxiang and Lu Zongyu) who they accused of being collaborators with the Japanese. The demonstration shifted to Cao's house in the East City District, and it was burned down. Cao escaped disguised as a servant, and was aided by his friend, Nakae Ushikichi, son of Nakae Chōmin. Cao resigned from his post on June 10, 1919, after a general strike in Shanghai threatened to spread to other provinces.

Cao resettled in the foreign concession in Tianjin. Hoping to rehabilitate his public image, he offered to make a substantial donation to the newly established Nankai University. Nankai's principal, Chang Po-Ling, was prepared to accept the donation on the condition that Cao join the University's Board of Trustees. By this time, the May Fourth Movement had spread to Tianjin. Word of the Chang's offer was leaked to students, who vehemently opposed the arrangement. One of the people active in leading opposition to the deal was Zhou Enlai.

Cao shifted his focus to private business interests after his resignation. He lived in mainland China throughout the Second Sino-Japanese War and Chinese Civil War, fleeing to Taiwan in 1949. Later, he moved to Japan and then the United States, where he died in 1966.

== See also ==
- May Fourth Movement
- Twenty-One Demands
- Treaty of Versailles
- Shandong Problem
