= Youth Day (China) =

Holiday in China

- Traditional Chinese: 五四青年節
- Simplified Chinese: 五四青年节
- Literal meaning: May Fourth Youth Day
Transcriptions
Standard Mandarin
- Hanyu Pinyin: wǔ sì qīngnián jié

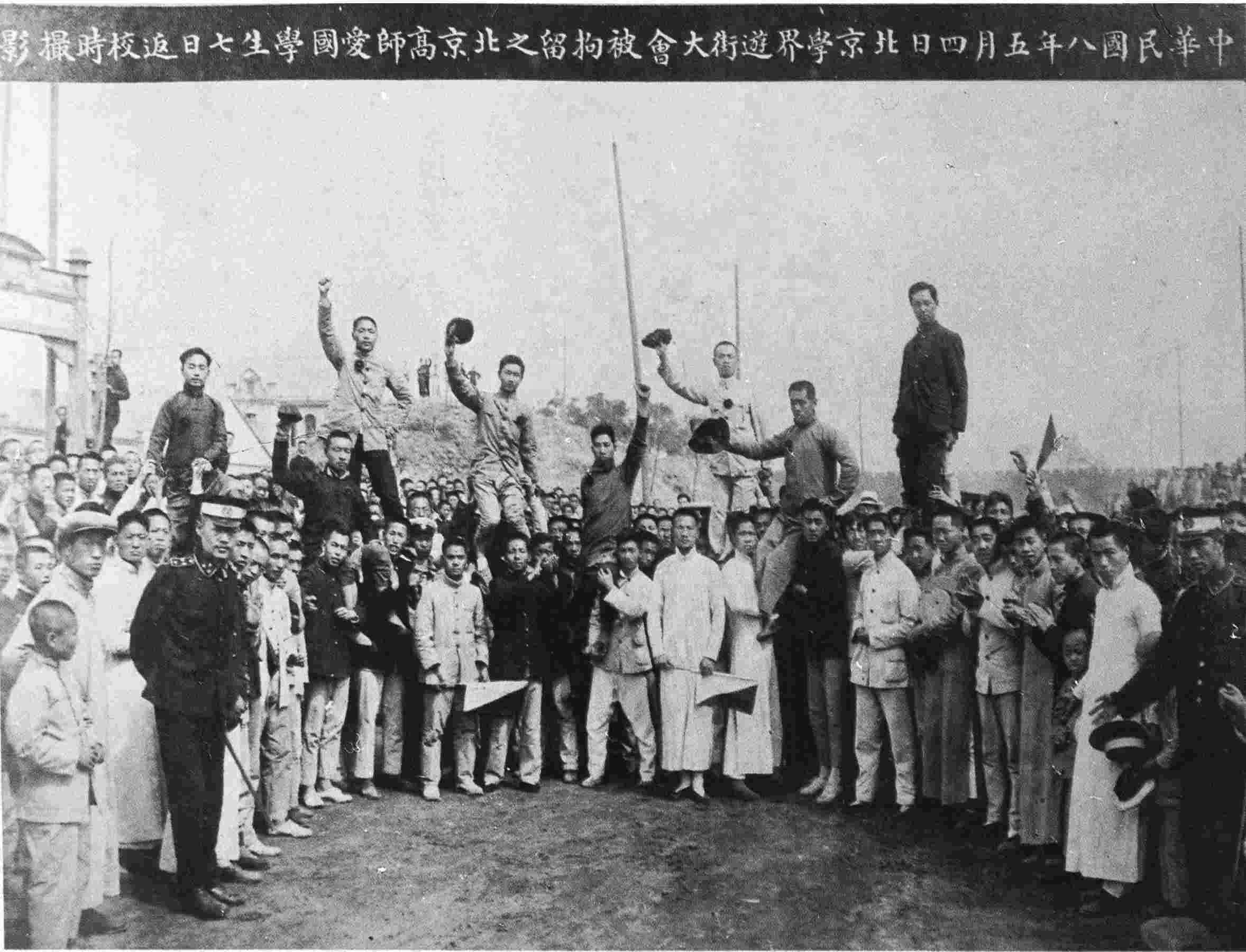
Students of Beijing Normal University after being detained by government during the May Fourth Movement.

Youth Day (Chinese: 五四青年节) is a holiday celebrated annually on May 4 in the People's Republic of China, in honor of young people aged 14 and older. It was established to commemorate the 1919 May Fourth Movement.

== Origins ==
On May 4, 1920, the first celebrations of the anniversary of the May Fourth Movement were held across China. Well-known figures such as Liang Qichao and Cai Yuanpei published articles speaking highly of the student demonstrations. In the 1920s, amid confrontations between the Guangzhou government and the Beiyang government, the Beiyang government prohibited rallies and marches commemorating the May Fourth Movement in Beijing and Tianjin, so the center of May Fourth Movement commemorations moved to Nanjing and Shanghai. In 1923, the National Student Association notified local student associations of a resolution that each student association was to hold a commemorative rally each year. With the May Ninth National Humiliation (五九國恥) and the May Third incident, the beginning of May began to accumulate anti-Japanese observances, and as the conflict between China and Japan deepened, the May Fourth anniversary became a symbol of anti-Japanese resistance. In 1933, more than a year after the Mukden Incident, one of the rallies declared May 4 as the "Anniversary of the Movement to Rejuvenate Chinese Culture".

In 1939, to commemorate the 20th anniversary of the May Fourth Movement, the Shaan-Gan-Ning Border Region Northwestern Youth National Aid Association decided to make May 4 China's Youth Day. Mao Zedong wrote an article praising the May Fourth Movement, and the same year, the Republic of China government designated May 4 as Youth Day. On May 4, 1939, the Kuomintang and the Communists both celebrated the first May Fourth Youth Day.

In 1940 or 1943, the KMT government moved Youth Day to March 29 to commemorate the martyrs of the Yellow Flower Mound Uprising. Despite this change in official status, many young people continued to celebrate May 4 as Youth Day with a variety of activities at universities throughout the country. Meanwhile, the KMT government designated May 4 as Literary Day, which was not celebrated as widely.

In 1949, the Government Administration Council proclaimed May 4 as China's Youth Day. They did not make it a public holiday for everyone, but gave people aged 14 to 28 a half day off.

Taiwan continues to observe May 4 as Literary Day.

== Observance ==
At Peking University, one of the universities where the May Fourth Movement began, the holiday is celebrated with speeches, singing competitions, and other activities.

In 1994, Youth Day was identified by the Central Committee of the Chinese Communist Party as one of several holidays for local governments to use for patriotic education.

After the handovers of Hong Kong and Macau, May Fourth Youth Day did not become a legal public holiday in the special administrative regions, but it has been celebrated with activities organized by government bodies and by individual organizations, such as flag-raising ceremonies at the Golden Bauhinia Square.

== See also ==
- Literary Day
- Youth Day (observances in other countries)
