= Lu Zongyu =

Chinese diplomat

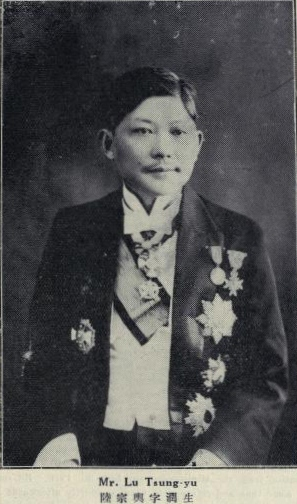
Lu Zongyu

Lu Zongyu (simplified Chinese: 陆宗舆; traditional Chinese: 陸宗輿; pinyin: Lù Zōngyú; 1876–1941) was a pro-Japanese Chinese diplomat at the Paris Peace Conference after World War I. Because of subscribing the Twenty-One Demands supporting Japanese interests, along with Zhang Zongxiang and Cao Rulin, he was labeled as a Hanjian ("traitor to the Chinese people") by students participating in the May Fourth Movement.

Originally from Zhejiang, Lu was educated in Japan and returned to China where he was a lecturer at Beijing College of Law and Administration. At the time of the instigation of the May Fourth Movement, Lu was the director-general of the Chinese Mint; the president of China, Xu Shichang, was forced to compel his resignation, along with Zhang and Cao's, after months of demonstrations, strikes, and meetings.

After his death, he received the courtesy name Runsheng.

Lu was a member of a spirit writing organization. Lu learned the practice and purported to transmit spirit-written commentaries on Confucian texts.

== Awards and decorations ==
- Order of Rank and Merit
- Order of Wen-Hu
- Order of the Rising Sun
