= Literary Day =

Holiday in Taiwan

- Traditional Chinese: 五四文藝節
- Simplified Chinese: 五四文艺节
- Literal meaning: May Fourth Literature and Art Day
Transcriptions
Standard Mandarin
- Hanyu Pinyin: Wǔ Sì Wényì Jié

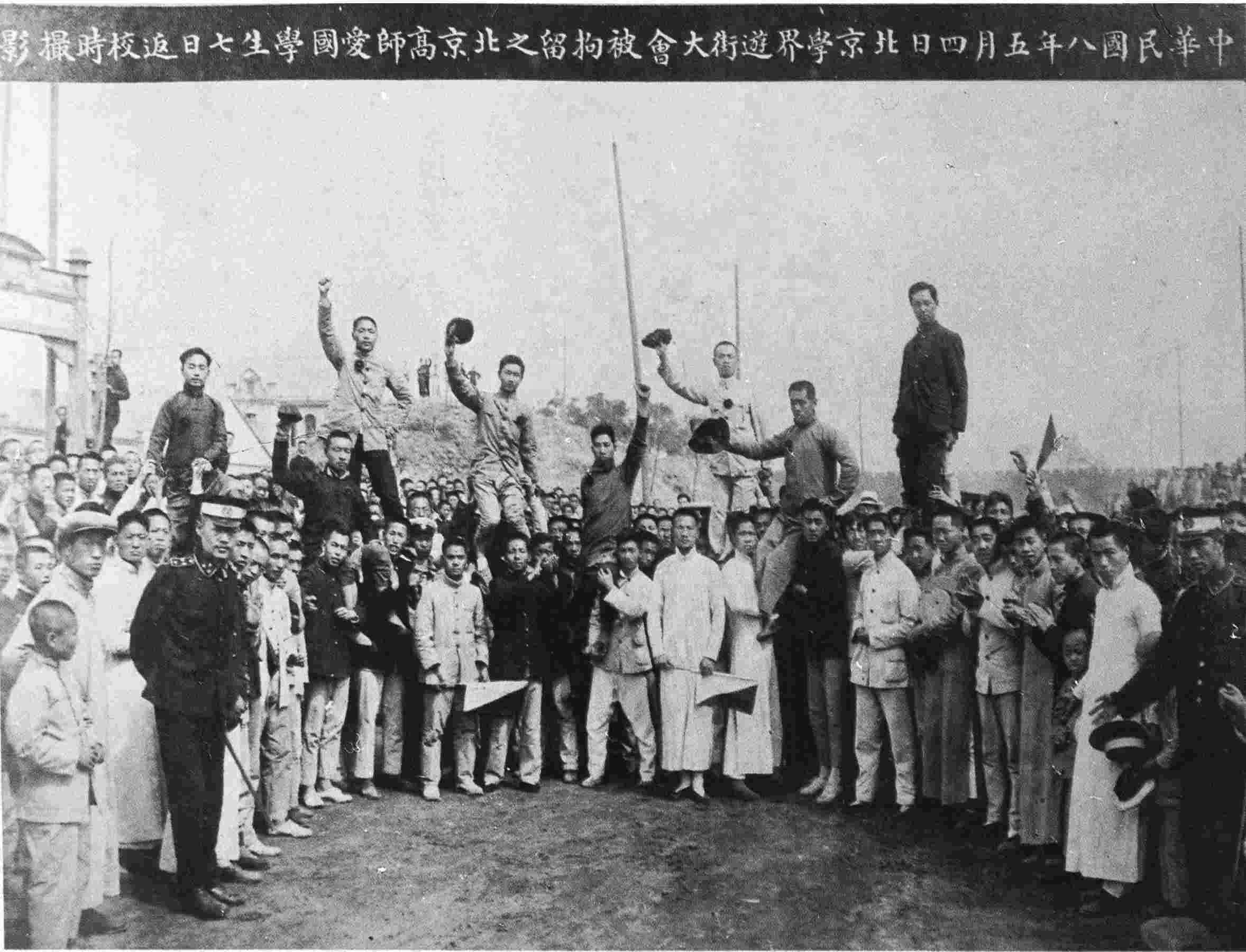
Students of Beijing Normal University after being detained by the government during the May Fourth Movement

Literary Day is observed annually on May 4 in Taiwan, in honor of the May Fourth Movement. It was first celebrated on this day in 1945, and its establishment was affected by the dispute over whether the Kuomintang or the Communist Party was the legitimate successor to the May Fourth Movement, disagreements about how to interpret the movement, and other cultural struggles.

== Historical origins ==
On May 4, 1920, the first celebrations of the anniversary of the May Fourth Movement were held across China. Well-known figures such as Liang Qichao and Cai Yuanpei published articles speaking highly of the student demonstrations. In the 1920s, amid confrontations between the Guangzhou government and the Beiyang government, the Beiyang government prohibited rallies and marches commemorating the May Fourth Movement in Beijing and Tianjin, so the center of May Fourth Movement commemorations moved to Nanjing and Shanghai. In 1923, the National Student Association notified local student associations of a resolution that each student association was to hold a commemorative rally each year. With the May Ninth National Humiliation (五九國恥) and the May Third incident, the beginning of May began to accumulate anti-Japanese observances, and as the conflict between China and Japan deepened, the May Fourth anniversary became a symbol of anti-Japanese resistance. In 1933, more than a year after the Mukden Incident, one of the rallies declared May 4 as the "Anniversary of the Movement to Rejuvenate Chinese Culture".

Literary Day was originally designated by the Nationalist government as March 27, in honor of the establishment of the All-China Resistance Association of Writers and Artists, while Youth Day was originally designated as May 4, in honor of the Three Principles of the People Youth Corps. The Shaan-Gan-Ning Border Region Northwestern Youth National Aid Association formally declared May 4 as Youth Day in March 1939. Mao Zedong wrote an article praising the May Fourth Movement, and the same year, the Republic of China government designated May 4 as Youth Day. On May 4, 1939, the Kuomintang (KMT) and the Communists both celebrated the first May Fourth Youth Day.

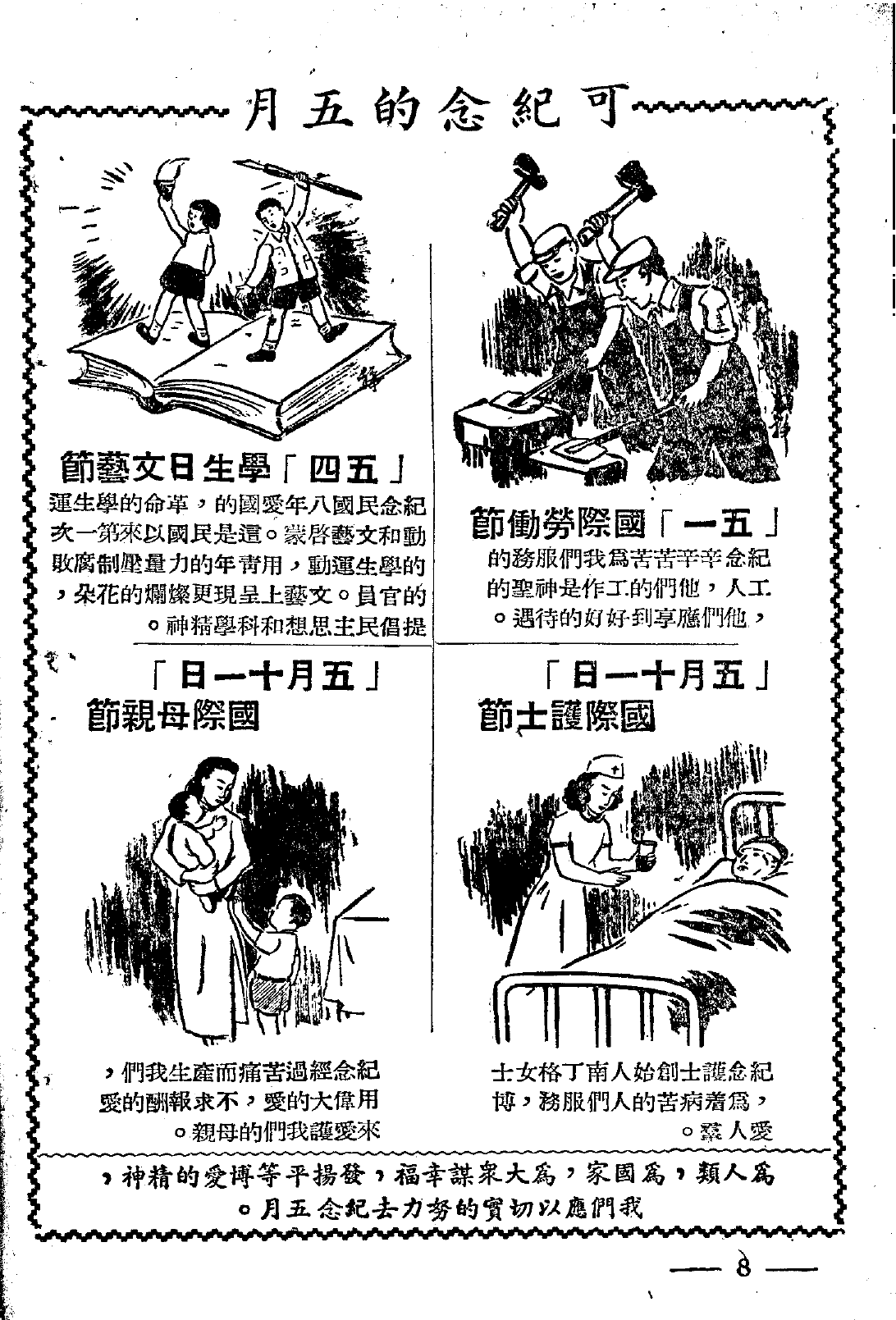
"A May to Remember", published in 1947 in New Child. The upper left section represents Literary Day.

In 1940 or 1943, the KMT government moved Youth Day to March 29 to commemorate the martyrs of the Yellow Flower Mound Uprising. The move provoked opposition: for instance, on May 3, 1944, National Southwestern Associated University held a symposium on the topic of "protecting the May Fourth spirit, carrying forward the May Fourth tradition". During the Chinese Civil War, the Kuomintang-established observance of Youth Day on March 29 became an occasion for people to express their dissatisfaction with the Kuomintang. The Communist Party took the opportunity to instigate a student movement for "survival, freedom, and peace".

In 1944, the KMT government changed the May Fourth observance to Literary Day, and the new observance was celebrated for the first time in 1945. In 1949, the new People's Republic of China Government Administration Council changed it back to Youth Day, and this difference in observance between the PRC (mainland China) and the ROC (Taiwan) persists to this day.

== In Taiwan ==
During the post-war period in Taiwan, when bensheng (Taiwanese-origin) authors discussed the May Fourth Movement, they emphasized the impact of the New Culture Movement on Taiwan starting during the period of Japanese rule. Waisheng (mainland-origin) authors focused on the May Fourth Movement resisting the Kuomintang's suppression of speech, or on the hope that the spirit of the movement would eliminate the remnants of Japanese culture in Taiwan and reestablish Chinese culture.

The Kuomintang government did not carry out any activities in Taiwan commemorating the May Fourth Movement during the period from 1945 to 1949, but on May 4, 1950, the Chinese Writers' and Artists' Association was established in Taipei, and in the 1950s, the Kuomintang government established the May Fourth literary award and began designating May 4 as Literary Day each year. They also began organizing events to commemorate the May Fourth Movement. Local government organizations, including in Matsu and Taoyuan, have held various events to celebrate Literary Day. The Chinese Writers' and Artists' Association organizes activities and celebrations, as well as awarding the Chinese Literary Award, which has more than 800 recipients to date. The president of the Republic of China (Taiwan) has also hosted events and presented literary awards.

The holiday is also celebrated by overseas Chinese, including in Los Angeles and San Francisco.

== See also ==
- Youth Day (China)
