= May Fourth Movement =

1919 Chinese cultural political movement

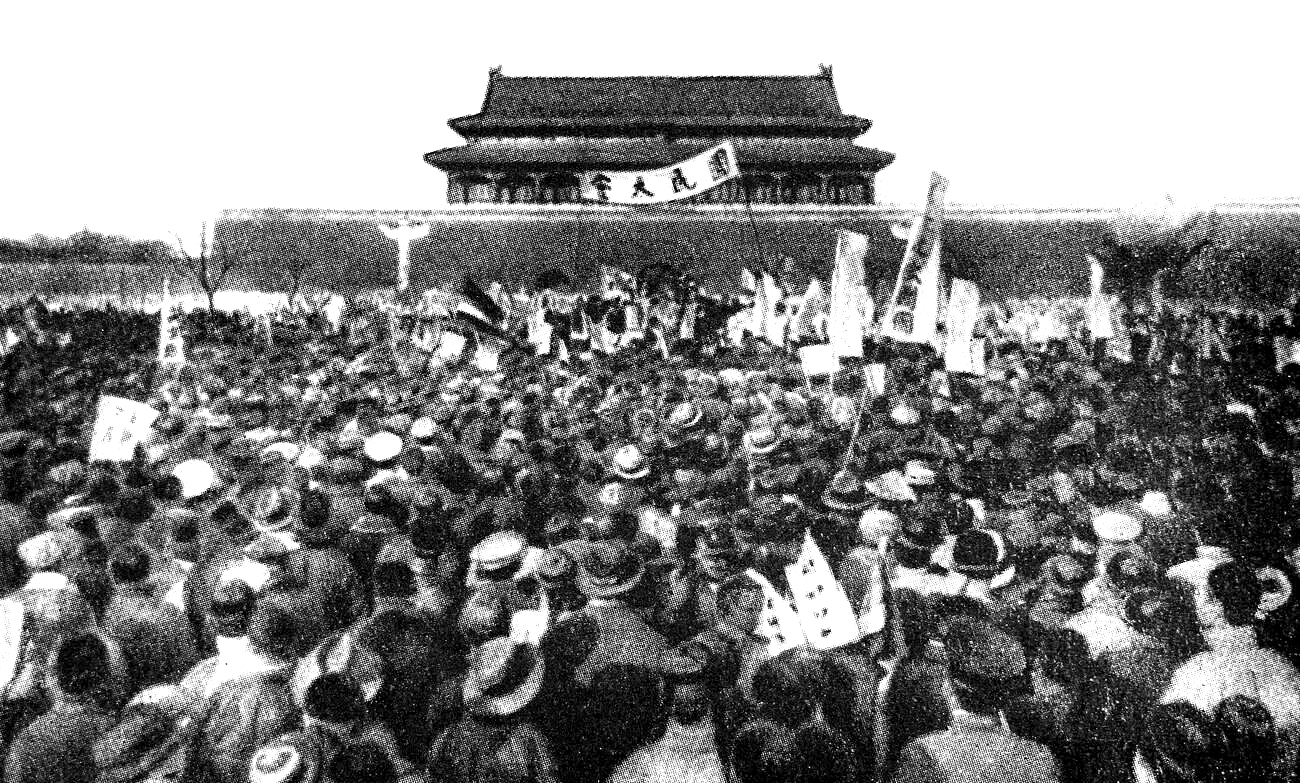
- Approximately 3,000 students from 13 Beijing universities gathered in Tiananmen Square
- Date: May 4, 1919
- Location: Republic of China
- Result: Government of Qian Nengxun weakened; Pro-Japanese officials removed; Treaty of Versailles goes unsigned by China; New Culture Movement splits; Spread of communism

Parties
Protesters	Beiyang government

May Fourth Movement
- Traditional Chinese: 五四運動
- Simplified Chinese: 五四运动
- Literal meaning: 5-4 Movement
Transcriptions
Standard Mandarin
- Hanyu Pinyin: Wǔsì yùndòng
- Bopomofo: ㄨˇ ㄙˋ ㄩㄣˋ ㄉㄨㄥˋ
- Gwoyeu Romatzyh: Wuusyh yunndonq
- Wade–Giles: Wu^{3}-ssu^{4} yün^{4}-tung^{4}
- Tongyong Pinyin: Wǔ-sìh yùn-dòng
- IPA: [ù.sɨ̂ ŷn.tʊ̂ŋ]
Yue: Cantonese
- Yale Romanization: Ńgh-sei wahn-duhng
- Jyutping: Ng5 sei3 wan6 dung6
- IPA: [ŋ.sej˧ wɐn˨.tʊŋ˨]
Southern Min
- Tâi-lô: Ngó-sì ūn-tūng

The May Fourth Movement was a Chinese cultural and anti-imperialist political movement which grew out of student protests in Beijing on May 4, 1919. Students gathered in front of Tiananmen to protest the Chinese government's weak response to the Treaty of Versailles decision to allow the Empire of Japan to retain territories in Shandong that had been surrendered by the German Empire after the Siege of Tsingtao in 1914. The demonstrations sparked nationwide protests and spurred an upsurge in Chinese nationalism, a shift towards political mobilization, away from cultural activities, and a move towards a populist base, away from traditional intellectual and political elites.

The May Fourth demonstrations marked a turning point in a broader anti-traditional New Culture Movement (1915–1921) that sought to replace traditional Confucian values and was itself a continuation of late Qing reforms. After 1919, a traditional model linking education with responsibility for cultural and political affairs remained influential among young people. They opposed traditional culture but looked abroad for cosmopolitan inspiration in the name of nationalism and were an overwhelmingly urban movement that espoused populism in an overwhelmingly rural country. Many political and social leaders of the next five decades emerged at this time, including those of the Chinese Communist Party (CCP).

== Background ==
Oxford University historian Rana Mitter observed that the "atmosphere and political mood that emerged around 1919 are at the center of a set of ideas that has shaped China's momentous twentieth century." The Qing dynasty had disintegrated in 1911, marking the end of thousands of years of imperial rule, and ushered a new era in which political power nominally rested with the people, but Confucianism still had a profound influence on social and political relations. After the death of President Yuan Shikai in 1916, China became dominated by warlords who were concerned with building political power and rival regional armies. The government in Beijing could do little to counter foreign influence and control. Chinese Premier Duan Qirui's signing of the secret Sino-Japanese Joint Defence Agreement in 1918 enraged the Chinese public when it was leaked to the press, and sparked a student protest movement that laid the groundwork for the May Fourth Movement. The March 1st Movement in Korea in 1919, the Russian Revolution of 1917, continued defeats by foreign powers and the presence of spheres of influence further inflamed Chinese nationalism among the emerging middle class and cultural leaders. The news of the March 1st Movement influenced many different Chinese intellectuals and students to look at this Movement more carefully. What these intellectuals saw was an example of a mass resistance against imperialism. This scale of protest has contributed to a growing nationalist sentiment in China. Inspiring many similar forms of political out speak and mobilization.

Leaders of the New Culture Movement blamed traditional Confucian values for the political weakness of the nation. Chinese nationalists called for a rejection of traditional values and the adoption of Western ideals of "Mr. Science" (賽先生; 赛先生; Sài xiānsheng) and "Mr. Democracy" (德先生; Dé xiānsheng) in place of "Mr. Confucius" in order to strengthen the new nation. These iconoclastic and anti-traditional views and programs have influenced China's politics and culture to the present day.

=== Twenty-One Demands ===
The twenty-one demands were a set of proposals presented by the Ōkuma Shigenobu government to the Yuan Shikai administration in hopes of expanding Japanese power in China. The demands consisted of a variety of economic and territorial provisions. These included the expansion of Japanese interests in southern Manchuria and eastern Mongolia, in addition to the confirmation of Japan's seizure of German ports in China's Shandong province.

In early 1915, Japan's submission of the twenty-one demands were revealed to the Chinese public, causing an outbreak of anti-Japanese sentiment in China, particularly in the Chinese press. The twenty-one demands ultimately added fuel to the rising tensions between the two countries, playing an important role in triggering the impending May Fourth Movement.

=== Shandong Problem ===
China had entered World War I on the side of the Triple Entente in 1917. Although that year, 140,000 Chinese laborers were sent to the Western Front as a part of the Chinese Labor Corps, the Treaty of Versailles ratified in April 1919 awarded rights to the German territories in Shandong to Japan. The representatives of the Chinese government put forth the following requests:

1. Abolition of all privileges of foreign powers in China, such as extraterritoriality
2. Cancelling of the Twenty-One Demands
3. Return to China of the territory and rights of Shandong, which Japan had taken from Germany during World War I.

The Western allies dominated the meeting at Versailles, and paid little heed to Chinese demands. The European delegations, led by French Prime Minister Georges Clemenceau, were primarily interested in punishing Germany. Although the American delegation promoted Woodrow Wilson's Fourteen Points and the ideals of self-determination, they were unable to advance these ideals in the face of stubborn resistance by David Lloyd George and Clemenceau. American advocacy of self-determination at the League of Nations was attractive to Chinese intellectuals, but their failure to follow through was seen as a betrayal. This failure of diplomacy at the Paris Peace Conference created what became known as the "Shandong Problem".

== Protests ==
=== May 4, 1919 ===
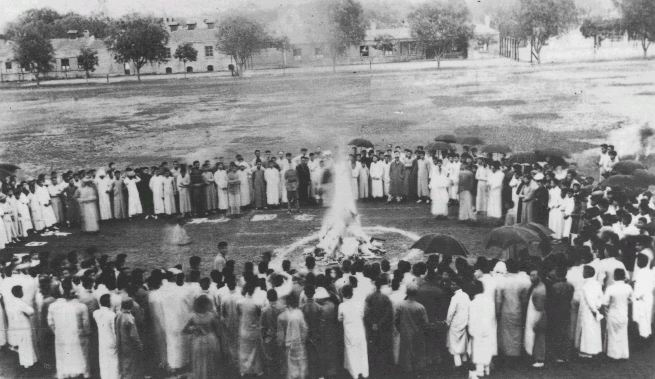
Tsinghua University students burning Japanese goods

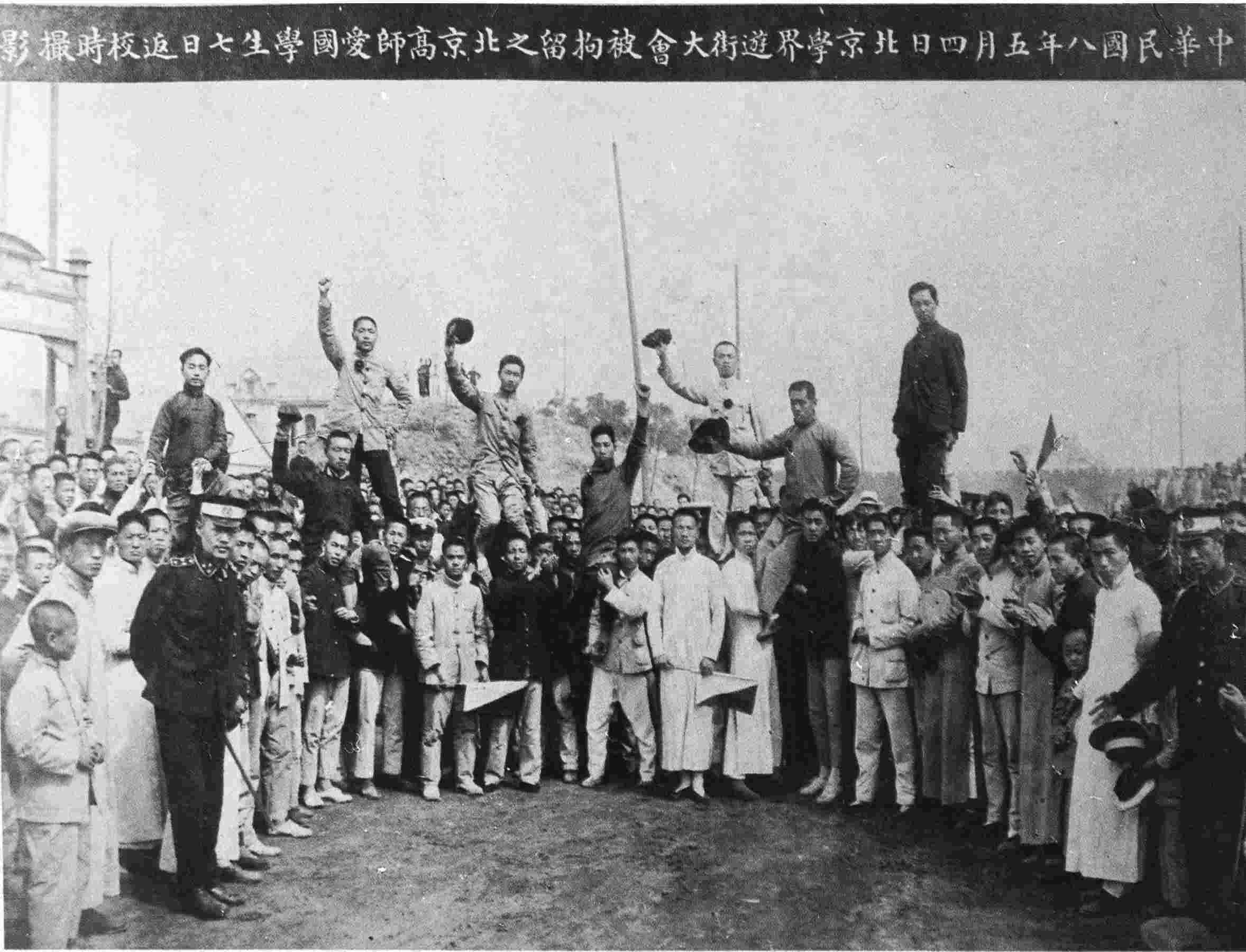
Peking Normal University students detained by the government during the May Fourth Movement

On the morning of May 4, 1919, student representatives from thirteen different local universities met in Beijing and drafted five resolutions:

1. To oppose the granting of Shandong to the Japanese under former German concessions.
2. To draw and increase awareness of China's precarious position to the masses in China.
3. To recommend a large-scale gathering in Beijing.
4. To promote the creation of a Beijing student union.
5. To hold a demonstration that afternoon in protest to the terms of the Treaty of Versailles.

On the afternoon of May 4, over 4,000 students of Yenching University, Peking University and other schools marched from many points to gather in front of Tiananmen. They shouted such slogans as "struggle for the sovereignty externally, get rid of the national traitors at home", "Give Qingdao back to us!", "do away with the Twenty-One Demands", and "don't sign the Versailles Treaty".

Protestors voiced their anger at the Allied betrayal of China, denounced the government's spineless inability to protect Chinese interests, and called for a boycott of Japanese products. Demonstrators insisted on the resignation of three Chinese officials they accused of being collaborators with the Japanese. After burning the residences of these officials and beating some of their servants, student protesters were arrested, jailed, and severely beaten.

=== Participants ===
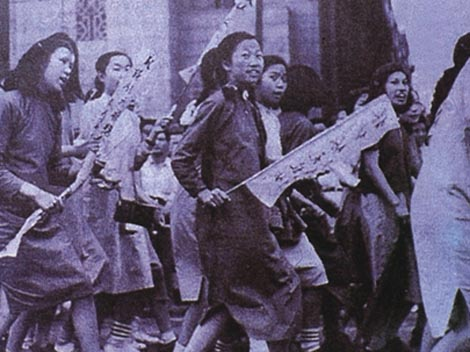
Female students participate in May Fourth demonstrations

On May 4, 1919, a group of Chinese students began protesting the contents of the Paris Peace Conference. Under the pressure, the Chinese delegation refused to sign the Treaty of Versailles. The original participants of the May Fourth Movement were students in Paris and Beijing, who joined forces to strike and take to the streets to express their dissatisfaction with the government. Some advanced students in Shanghai and Guangzhou joined the protest movement as it progressed, gradually forming a wave of mass student strikes across China. In June 1919, the Beijing government carried out the "June 3" arrests, in which nearly 1,000 students were arrested. However, this did not suppress the patriotic student movement, instead further angering the Chinese public and increasing revolutionary sentiment. Workers and businessmen across the country went on strike in support of the students' movement, marking the entrance of the Chinese working class into the political arena.

With the emergence of working-class support, the May Fourth Movement developed to a new stage. The center of the movement shifted from Beijing to Shanghai, and the working class replaced students as the main force of the movement. The Shanghai working class staged a strike of an unprecedented scale. The growing scale of the national strike and the increasing number of its participants led to a paralysis of the country's economic life and posed a serious threat to the government in Beijing. The working class took the place of the students to stand up and resist. The support for this movement throughout the country reflected the enthusiasm for nationalism and national rejuvenation, which was also the foundation for the development and expansion of the May Fourth Movement. Benjamin I. Schwartz added, "Nationalism which was, of course, a dominant passion of the May Fourth experience was not so much a separate ideology as a common disposition."

During the May Fourth era, pledges of celibacy were a means through which participants resisted traditional marriage and devote themselves to revolutionary causes.

=== Expansion ===
On May 5, students in Beijing as a whole went on strike and in the larger cities across China, students, patriotic merchants, and workers joined protests. The demonstrators skillfully appealed to the newspapers and sent representatives to carry the word across the country. On the morning of May 6, students from Shanghai gathered at Fudan University in response to the events in Beijing. By the evening, meetings and special committees were held at various campuses in Shanghai, and telegrams were sent to the Beijing government in the name of the 33 representatives of different campuses in Shanghai to express their protest. Over the next few days, the movement grew in size. Students in Shanghai began striking at the end of May. During this time, disagreements arose within the protesters about the intensity of the protests, but the protests as a whole were seen to be intensifying.

On June 3, police in Beijing arrested a large number of students. To express their disapproval to it, businessmen and workers in Shanghai joined the strike. The center of the movement shifted from Beijing to Shanghai. Chancellors from thirteen universities arranged for the release of student prisoners, and Cai Yuanpei, the principal of Peking University resigned in protest. Although at this point the event was defined as a multi-class protest action, overall it was still a student-led movement.

Newspapers, magazines, citizen societies, and chambers of commerce offered support for the students. Merchants threatened to withhold tax payments if China's government remained obstinate. In Shanghai, a general strike of merchants and workers nearly devastated the entire Chinese economy. On June 12, the general strike ended because under intense public pressure, the Beijing government dismissed Cao Rulin, Zhang Zongxiang and Lu Zongyu that had been accused of being collaborators with the Japanese. Nevertheless, students continued to express their protest against the content of the Versailles Peace Treaty by organizing rallies and other events at that time, and organized the National Student Union. Finally, Chinese representatives in Paris refused to sign the Versailles Treaty: the May Fourth Movement won an initial victory which was primarily symbolic, since Japan for the moment retained control of the Shandong Peninsula and the islands in the Pacific. Even the partial success of the movement exhibited the ability of China's social classes across the country to successfully collaborate given proper motivation and leadership.

== Significance ==
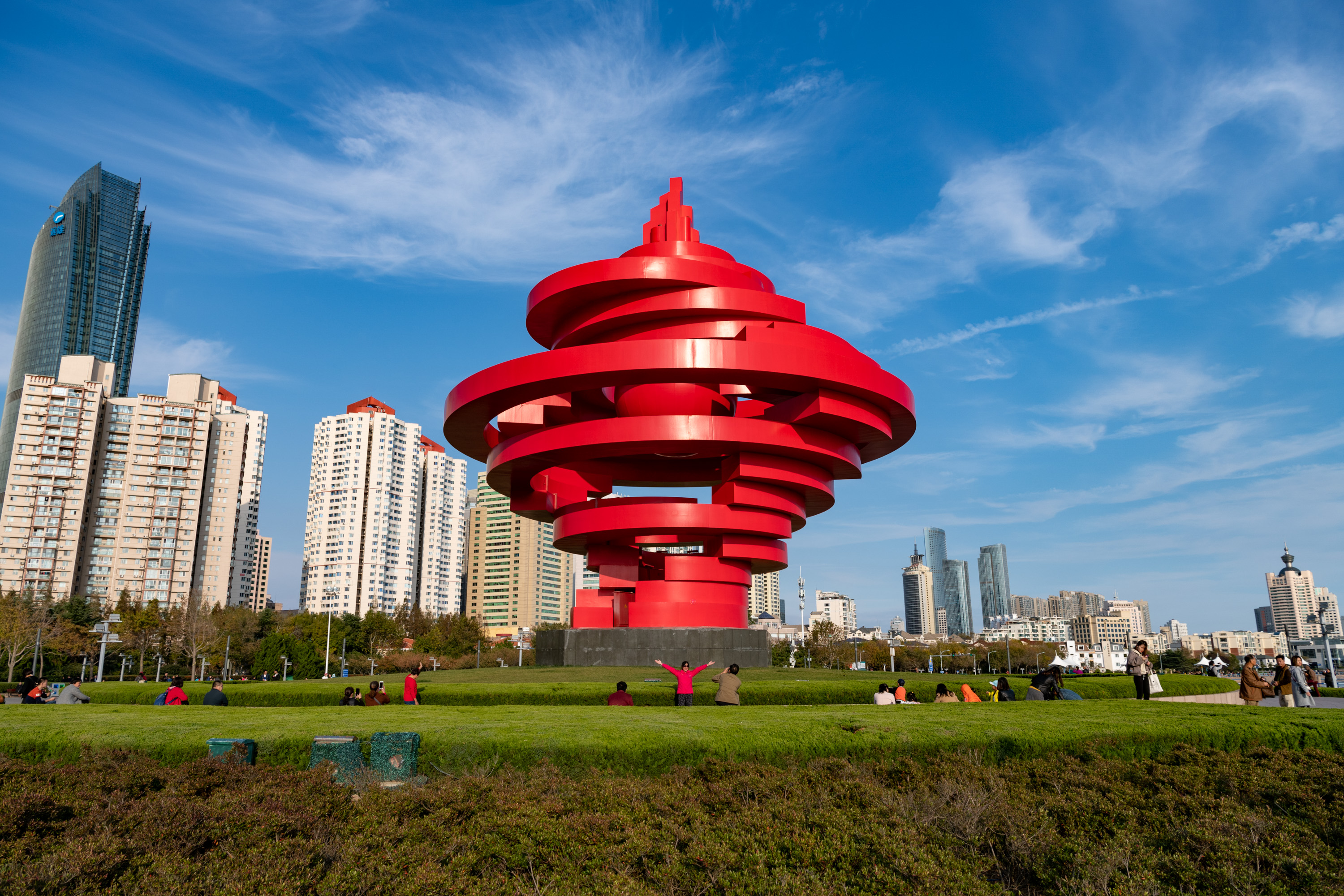
The sculpture of "Wind of May" in Qingdao, Shandong

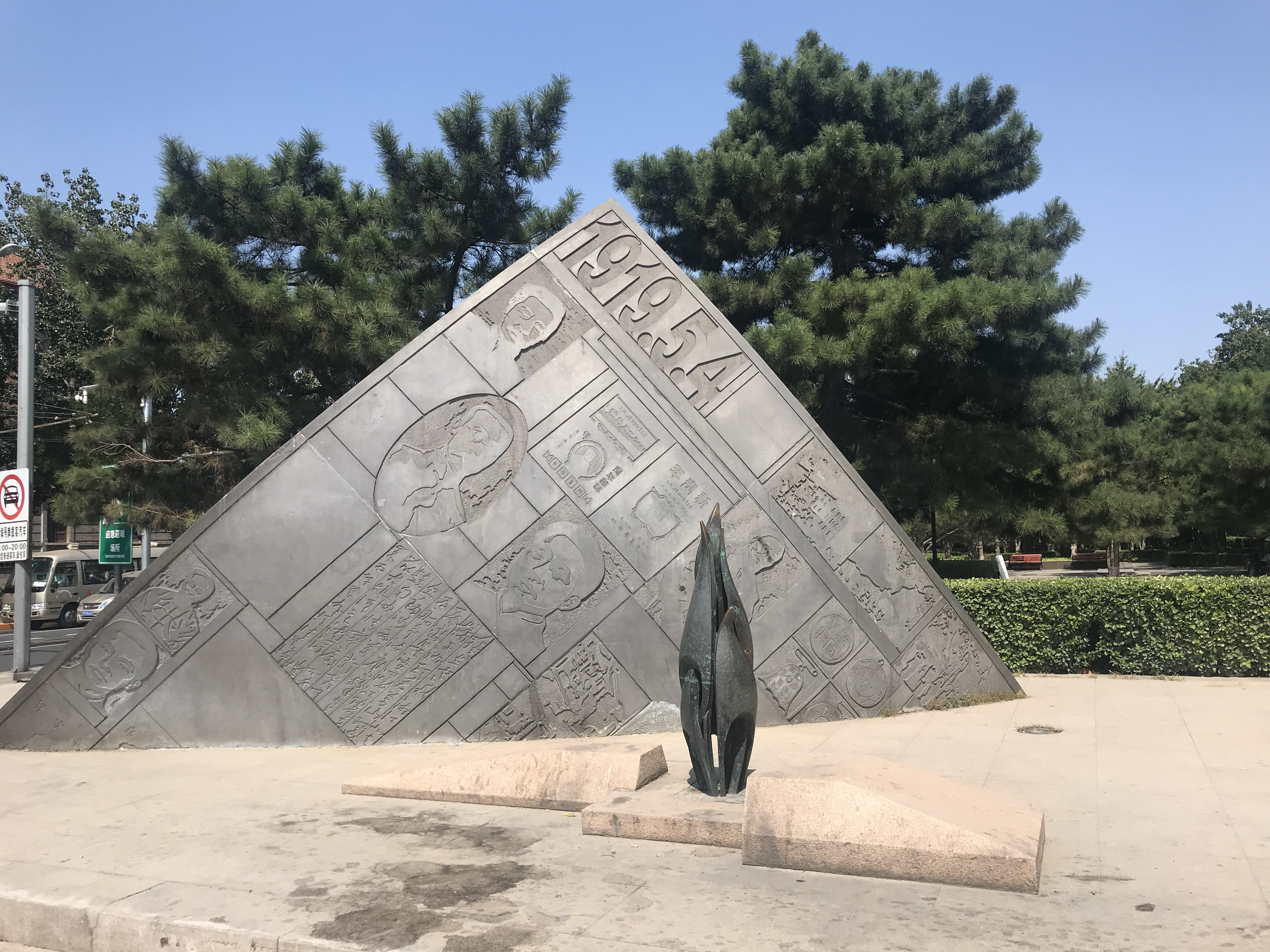
A monument to the May Fourth Movement in Dongcheng, Beijing

Scholars rank the New Culture and May Fourth Movements as significant turning points, as David Der-wei Wang said, "it was the turning point in China's search for literary modernity", along with the abolition of the civil service system in 1905 and the overthrow of the monarchy in 1911. The challenge to traditional Chinese values, however, was also met with strong opposition, especially from parts of the Kuomintang. From their perspective, the movement destroyed the positive elements of Chinese tradition and placed a heavy emphasis on direct political actions and radical attitudes, characteristics associated with the emerging Chinese Communist Party (CCP). Two of the CCP's founding members, Li Dazhao and Chen Duxiu, were leaders of the movement. The CCP viewed it more favorably, although remaining suspicious of the early phase which emphasized the role of enlightened intellectuals, not revolution. Li and Chen were the most influential promoters of Marxism in China during the May Fourth period. In its broader sense, the May Fourth Movement led to the establishment of radical intellectuals who went on to mobilize peasants and workers into the CCP and gain the organizational strength that would solidify the success of the Chinese Communist Revolution.

During the May Fourth Movement, the group of intellectuals with communist ideas grew steadily, such as Chen Tanqiu, Zhou Enlai, Chen Duxiu, and others, who gradually appreciated Marxism's power. This promoted the sinicization of Marxism and provided a basis for the birth of the CCP and socialism with Chinese characteristics.

The legacy of the May Fourth Movement is embraced both by the CCP and its critics, who express different understandings of the movement and its importance.

Kuomintang members such as Luo Jialun, Shao Lizi and Duan Xipeng played an active role in the Movement, and some Kuomintang leaders claimed that their party and its founder Sun Yat-sen were active in leading the movement. However, Kuomintang influence on the Movement was minimal. In British Malaya, May Fourth-influenced riots in Penang and Singapore involving Kuomintang teachers and sympathetic students led the British to pass the Registration of Schools Ordinance, an attempt to remove Kuomintang influence from local education. From 1922, the British also instituted a ban on the Kuomintang itself.

=== Birth of Chinese communism ===
For many years, the orthodox view in the People's Republic of China was that after the demonstrations of 1919 and their subsequent suppression, the discussion of possible policy changes became more and more politically realistic. Influential leaders such as Chen Duxiu and Li Dazhao shifted to the left and became founders of the CCP in 1921, while other intellectuals became more sympathetic. Originally voluntarist or nihilist figures like Li Shicen and Zhu Qianzhi made similar turns to the left as the 1920s saw China become increasingly turbulent. In 1939, Mao Zedong claimed that the May Fourth Movement was a stage leading toward the fulfillment of the Chinese Communist Revolution:

The May Fourth Movement twenty years ago marked a new stage in China's bourgeois-democratic revolution against imperialism and feudalism. The cultural reform movement which grew out of the May Fourth Movement was only one of the manifestations of this revolution. With the growth and development of new social forces in that period, a powerful camp made its appearance in the bourgeois-democratic revolution, a camp consisting of the working class, the student masses and the new national bourgeoisie. Around the time of the May Fourth Movement, hundreds of thousands of students courageously took their place in the van. In these respects the May Fourth Movement went a step beyond the Revolution of 1911.

Paul French argues that the only victor of the Treaty of Versailles in China was communism, as rising public anger led directly to the formation of the CCP. The Treaty also led to Japan pursuing its conquests with greater boldness, which Wellington Koo had predicted in 1919 would lead to the outbreak of war between China and Japan.

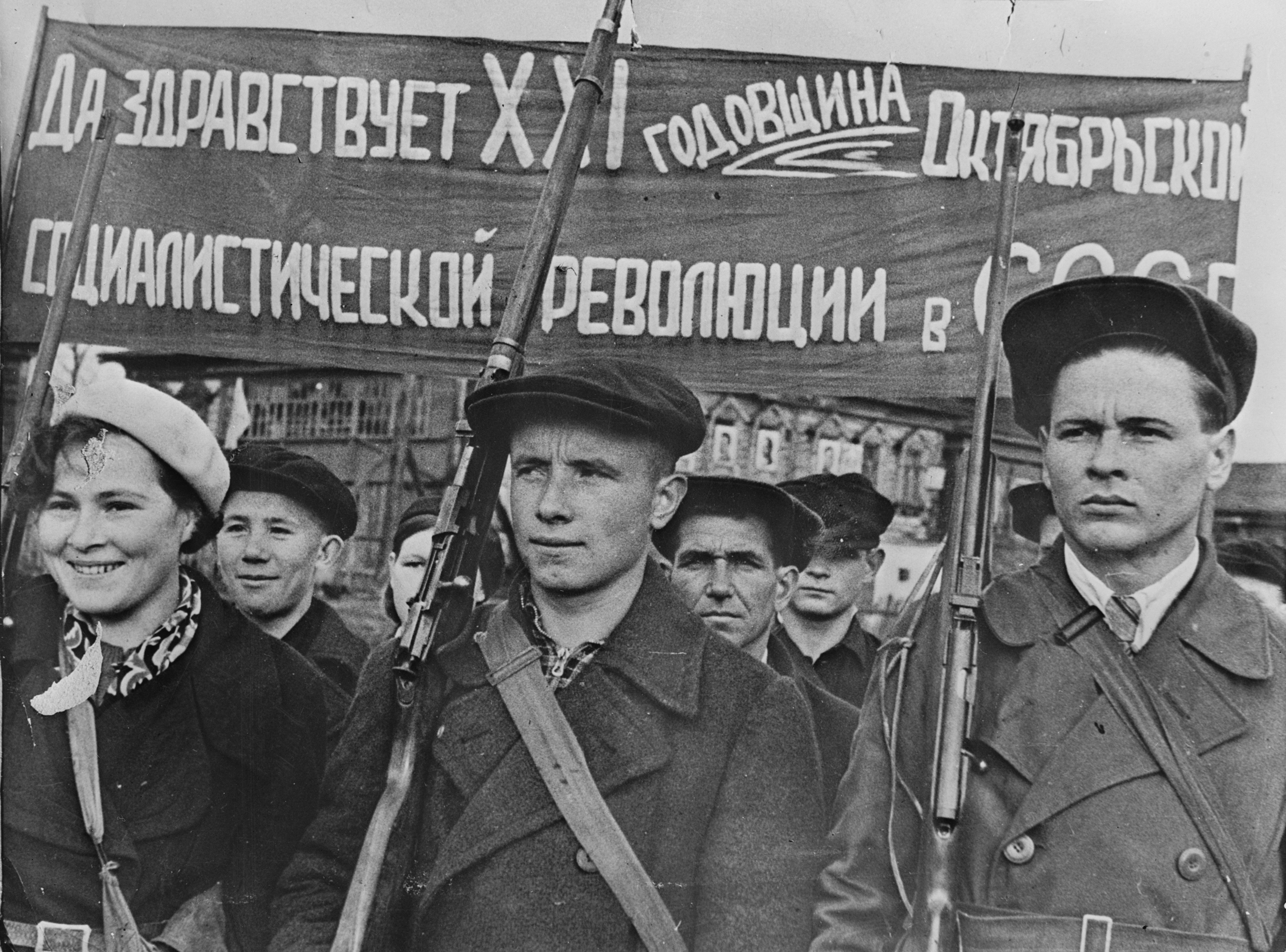
A rally on the 21st anniversary of the October Revolution in Russia

Western-style liberal democracy had previously had a degree of traction among Chinese intellectuals. Still, after Versailles, which was viewed as a betrayal of China's interests, it lost much of its attractiveness. Woodrow Wilson's Fourteen Points, despite being rooted in moralism, were seen as Western-centric and hypocritical. Many Chinese intellectuals believed that the United States had done little to convince the other nations to adhere to the Fourteen Points and observed that the United States had declined to join the League of Nations. As a result, they turned away from the Western liberal democratic model. With the October Revolution in Russia in 1917, Marxism began to take hold in Chinese intellectual thought, particularly among those already on the Left. Chinese intellectuals such as Chen Duxiu and Li Dazhao began serious study of Marxist doctrine.

=== Cultural ===
The May Fourth Movement focused on opposing Confucian culture and promoting a new culture. As a continuation of the New Culture movement, the May Fourth Movement greatly influenced the cultural field. The slogans of "democracy" and "science" advocated in the New Culture Movement were designed to attack the old culture and promote the new culture. This purpose can be summed up in a sentence from David Wang: "It was the turning point in China's search for literary modernity." As historian Wang Gungwu notes, the May Fourth Movement became subsequently identified as the predecessor and inspiration for the later Cultural Revolution.

Participants at the time, such as Hu Shih, referred to this era as the "Chinese Renaissance", because there was an intense focus on science and experimentation. In Chinese literature, the May Fourth Movement is regarded as the watershed after which the modern Chinese literature began and the use of written vernacular Chinese gained currency over Literary Chinese, eventually replacing it in formal works. Intellectuals were driven toward expressing themselves using the spoken tongue under the slogan "my hand writes what my mouth speaks" (我手寫我口), although the change was gradual: Hu had already argued for the use of the modern vernacular language in literature in his 1917 essay "Preliminary discussion on literary reform".

In 1917, Chen Hengzhe published the short story One Day (一日) in an overseas student quarterly (留美学生季报)—a year before the publication of Lu Xun's Diary of a Madman and The True Story of Ah Q (not published until 1921), which has often been incorrectly credited as the first vernacular Chinese fiction.

More ordinary people also began to try to get in touch with new cultures and learn from foreign cultures. Joseph Chen said: "This intellectual ferment had already had an effect in altering the outlook of China's new youth." After the May Fourth Movement, the Chinese modern female literature developed a literature with modern humanistic spirit, taking women as the subject of experience, thinking, aesthetics, and speech.

Instead of the formerly euphemistic language for sex, May Fourth reformers used the broader, more explicit term xing.

In honor of the May Fourth Movement, May 4 is now celebrated as Youth Day in China and as Literary Day in Taiwan.

=== Women's emancipation ===
The domination of Confucian ideologies shaped gender inequalities in Chinese culture, labeling and treating women as second-class citizens. The May Fourth Movement played a crucial role in women's emancipation in China, representing a social and cultural shift toward societal transformation.

May Fourth Movement discourses contrasted the idea of the "new woman" with that of the "traditional woman". The "new woman" reflected a secular world view, opposition to arranged marriage, and opposition to patriarchy. The idea of the "new woman" emphasised the urban and modern. May Fourth Movement discourses framed "traditional women" as rural, uneducated, and submitting to "feudal superstition". May Fourth literature often depicted rural mothers as participants in imposing arranged marriages and other feudal social constructs on their daughters.

Women in the May Fourth Movement were often restricted to indoor speeches and debates, lacking the same freedom of movement as their male counterparts. Although most activists and protesters were male, male intellectuals believed women's liberation was essential for a stronger and unified China. They argued that Confucian family structures hindered China's development. Stating that "Women's liberation had to be achieved to save China from disarray and humiliation." Many supported the movement as they believed that women's emancipation was essential for a modern China. They saw it as intertwined with nationalism and new democratic values driven by the anti-imperialist movement.

=== Economic ===
Anger against Japan led many elements of society to join students in a movement to boycott Japanese products. Many hoped that when Japanese products were suppressed, China's national industry would benefit. However, the strike in Shanghai that occurred in June damaged the economy. One of the main reasons was that shop owners were not willing to open their shops during the strike, despite the use of police force.

=== Religion ===
During the May Fourth Movement, Chinese intellectuals and students criticized Christianity for its associations with Western imperialism. Responding to these perspectives, some Chinese Protestant leaders began indigenous church movements seeking to establish Protestant churches in China that were independent of foreign finances, control, or leadership. Among these developments in the post-May Fourth environment was the Local Church movement led by Watchman Nee (Ni Tuosheng).

== Criticism and resistance ==
Many intellectuals at the time opposed the anti-traditional message, some felt it did not go far enough, and many political figures ignored it. In the late twentieth century, voices more strongly questioned the premise that Chinese traditional culture had to be destroyed rather than developed.

Kuomintang leader Chiang Kai-shek, as a Confucian and a nationalist, was against the iconoclasm of the May Fourth Movement. As an anti-imperialist, he was skeptical of Western culture. He criticized these May Fourth intellectuals for corrupting the morals of youth. When the Nationalist party came to power under Chiang's rule, it carried out the opposite agenda. The New Life Movement promoted Confucianism, and the Kuomintang purged China's education system of western ideas, introducing Confucianism into the curriculum. Textbooks, exams, degrees, and educational instructors were all controlled by the state, as were all universities.

Some conservative philosophers and intellectuals opposed any change, but many more accepted or welcomed the challenge from the West but wanted to base new systems on Chinese values, not imported ones. These figures included Liang Shuming, Liu Shipei, Tao Xisheng, Xiong Shili, Zhang Binglin and Lu Xun's brother, Zhou Zuoren. In later years, others developed critiques, including figures as diverse as Lin Yutang, Ch'ien Mu, Xu Fuguan, and Yu Ying-shih. Li Changzhi believed that the May Fourth Movement copied foreign culture and lost the essence of its own culture. (Ta Kung Pao, 1942). This is consistent with what Vera Schwarcz has said: "Critically-minded intellectuals were accused of eroding national self-confidence, or more simply, of not being Chinese enough."

Another view was that "this limited May Fourth individualist enlightenment did not lead the individual against the collective of the nation-state, as full-scale, modern Western individualism would potentially do."

Chinese Muslims ignored the May Fourth movement by continuing to teach Classical Chinese and literature with the Qur'an and Arabic along with officially mandated contemporary subjects at the "Normal Islamic School of Wanxian". Ha Decheng did a Classical Chinese translation of the Quran. Arabic, vernacular Chinese, Classical Chinese and the Qur'an were taught in Ningxia Islamic schools funded by Muslim General Ma Fuxiang.

== Neotraditionalism versus Western thought ==
Although the May Fourth Movement attack on traditional Chinese culture was largely successful, opponents still argued that China's traditions and values should be the fundamental foundations of the nation. These opponents of Western civilization formed three neotraditional schools of thought: national essence, national character, and modern relevance of Confucianism. Each school of thought denounced the western values of individualism, materialism and utilitarianism as inadequate avenues for the development of China. Each school held to specific objectives. The "national essence" school sought to discover aspects of traditional culture that could potentially serve the national development of China. Such traditional aspects consisted of various philosophical and religious practices that emerged parallel with Confucianism. Most particularly, China imported Buddhism during antiquity from India. Under the "national character" school, advocates promoted the traditional family system, the primary target of the May Fourth Movement. In this school, reformers viewed Westerners as shells without morals. Finally, the modern relevance of Confucianism was centered on the notion that Confucian values were better than Western ones. In response to western culture's primary concentration on rational analysis, China's neo-traditionalists argued that this was misguided, especially in the practical, changing milieu of the world. Most importantly, these three neo-traditionalist thoughts did not consider the individual, which was the main theme of the May Fourth Movement.

== See also ==
- History of the Republic of China
- History of Beijing
- 1976 Tiananmen incident
- New Enlightenment (China)
- Qiu Jin
