= Heilan Equestrian Club =

Heilan Equestrian Club (Chinese: 海澜国际马术俱乐部; pinyin: Hǎilán Guójì Mǎshù Jùlèbù) is an equestrian club located in Xinqiao Town, Jiangyin City in Jiangsu, China. Zhou Jianping is the president of the club.

Heilan Equestrian Club covers an area of 400 mu (0.26 km^{2}). It contains an international-standard and comprehensive equestrian training venue, as well as some supporting service facilities such as Flavor Bar and Taoyuan Resort. There are nine senior horse-training coaches of foreign countries, 36 professional equestrian trainers and over 100 members registered in the club. The horses here are brought in from different countries, such as Germany, Netherlands, Spain and Portugal. Also, there are 60 horses from Xinjiang and Beijing. The initial investment toward the club added up to RMB1.3B.

On August 24, 2009, with an agreement reached, the Jiangsu Equestrian Team moved to Heilan Equestrian Club.
