= Shiyun huibian =

Collection of Chinese rhyme books

Shiyun huibian (simplified Chinese: 十韵汇编; traditional Chinese: 十韻彙編; pinyin: Shíyùn huìbiān; Wade–Giles: Shih-yun hui-pien; “Compilation of Ten Rhyme Books” or “A Collection of Ten Rhyme Books”) is a collection of Chinese rhyme books compiled by the modern scholars Liu Fu 刘复 (1891–1934), Wei Jiangong 魏建功 (1901–1980) und Luo Changpei 罗常培 (1899–1958). Besides the Guangyun (广韵), the nine other texts of rhyme books with various early printed and manuscript versions of Qieyun ("Spelled Rhymes", a pioneering book the compilation of which was carried out under the leadership of Lu Fayan 陸法言 in 601 CE) can be used as a critical study of the Guangyun, with which the other texts can be compared.

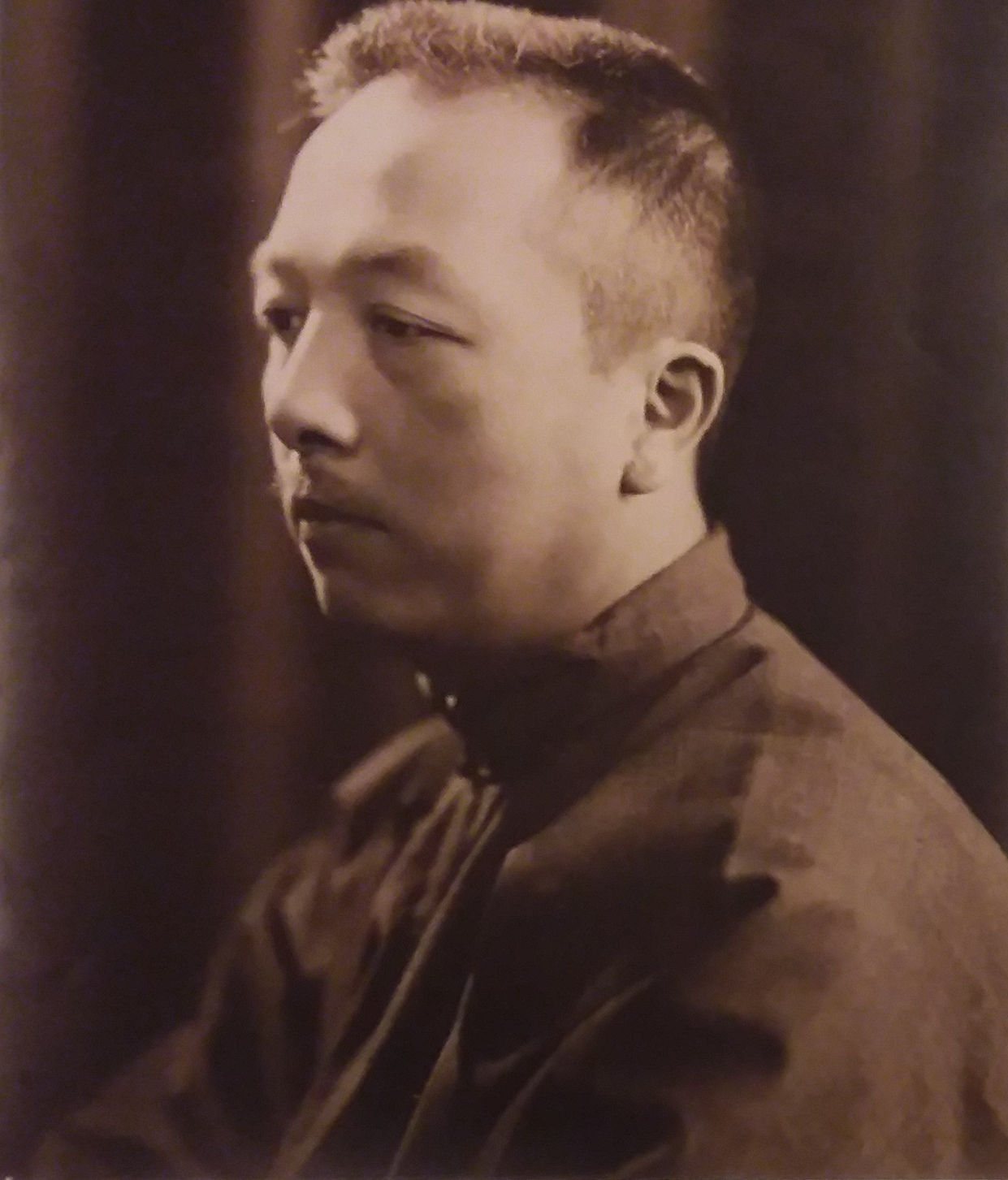
Liu Fu (Liu Bannong)

== Introduction ==
The important linguistic work from the Republic of China period brings together nine extant (though incomplete) manuscript and printed editions of various rhyming dictionaries of the qieyun system (切韻系 or 《切韵》音系) from the Tang and Five Dynasties periods—including the Kanmiu buque Qieyun (刊謬補缺切韻; "Corrected and supplemented Qieyun") by Wang Renxu (王仁煦), and the Tangyun 唐韵, as well as a complete edition of the Guangyun 广韵.

This comprehensive comparative compilation of rhyme dictionaries was compiled by Liu Fu, together with Wei Jiangong 魏建功 and Luo Changpei 罗常培. It is notable for compiling materials from ten different rime dictionaries and arranging them for comparison according to rime categories. The book includes Notes on the Collation of the Guangyun (Guangyun jiaokan ji 广韵校勘记), as well as a rime index and a radical index.

Because of its meticulous organization and practical structure, the work is regarded as a representative example of applying scientific methods to the study and systematization of traditional Chinese scholarship. It continues to hold significant reference value for historical linguistics and the study of Chinese phonology. The Hanyu da zidian (HYDZD) for example is using the edition Peking University print. A newer facsimile edition is based on this first edition. An additional essay Shiyun huibian ziliao bu bing shi 十韵汇编资料补并释 (Supplement and Explanation of the Materials of the Ten Rime Compendium) by Wei Jiangong 魏建功, is appended at the end. Wei Jiangong gathered for it as many extant fragments as he could at that time.

== Overview ==
In the following section is given a short overview to the ten books:

- 1-3. Three fragmentary copies of Qieyun. Wang Guowei had copied these fragments by hand in the British Library, where they had been taken from Dunhuang by Aurel Stein.
- 4. An edition of Qieyun published during the Five Dynasties period (907-979 CE), held at the BnF.
- 5. A manuscript edition of Qieyun from the Dunhuang collection in Paris.
- 6. A Tang manuscript edition of Qieyun transcribed from the copy at the imperial palace in Beijing.
- 7. A Tang manuscript edition of Qieyun in a private collection.
- 8. A fragmentary manuscript edition of Qieyun held in Berlin and stemming from excavations in Turfan.
- 9. A Tang manuscript Qieyun fragment from a Japanese collection.
- 10. And finally, Guangyun.

== See also ==
- Glossary of Chinese Historical Phonology (in German)
- Dunhuang manuscripts
- Chinese phonology

== Bibliography ==
- Liu Fu 刘复, Wei Jiangong 魏建功, Luo Changpei 罗常培: Shiyun huibian 十韵汇编. Beijing daxue yinben 北京大学印本 1935
- Liu Fu 刘复, Wei Jiangong 魏建功, Luo Changpei 罗常培: Shiyun huibian 十韵汇编. Guojia tushuguan chubanshe 国家图书馆出版社 2009, ISBN 9787501337989 (facsimile edition)
- Wei Jiangong 魏建功: Shiyun huibian ziliao bu bing shi 十韻彙編資料補並釋, Beijing University Press, Beijing 1948. (Guoli Beijing daxue wushi zhounian jinian lunwenji 國立北京大學五十週年紀年論文集, Faculty of Letters Series, 15)
- Ye Jiande 葉鍵得: Shiyun huibian yanjiu 十韻彙編研究（2 vols.）. 2015. ISBN 9789577399731 (first published in 1988) (Contents)
