= Liu Tianhua =

Chinese musician

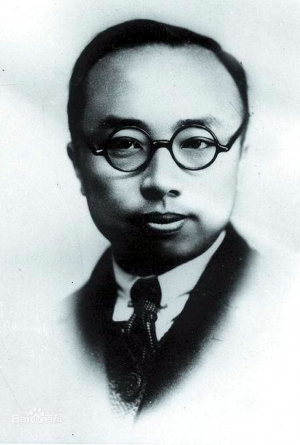

Background information
- Born: 1895; Jiangyin, Jiangsu, China
- Origin: Jiangsu
- Died: 1932 (aged 36–37) Beijing
- Genres: Chinese classical
- Instruments: Erhu, Pipa
- Years active: early 1900s

Liu Tianhua (simplified Chinese: 刘天华; traditional Chinese: 劉天華; pinyin: Liú Tiānhuá; Wade–Giles: Liu T'ien-hua; 1895–1932) was a Chinese musician and composer best known for his innovative work for the erhu. Liu's students, such as Jiang Fengzhi and Chen Zhenduo, continued to contribute to the development of the erhu.

He was the younger brother of the poet Liu Bannong. He died in 1932 at the age of 37.

== Work on Chinese music ==
Liu was a noted erhu and pipa player, and an early pioneer in the modernisation of traditional Chinese music. He joined Cai Yuanpei's Peking University Music Society as an instrumental instructor in 1922. He promoted Chinese music while he was at Peking University, founded the Society for the Improvement of Chinese Music (國樂改進社, Guóyuè Gǎijìnshè) in 1927 and its periodical, the Music Magazine (音樂雜誌, Yīnyuè Zázhì). The society organised classes and formed a musical ensemble to play Chinese music, a forerunner of the modern Chinese orchestra. He made improvements to the traditional fiddle huqin, in particular the erhu, so that it can become an instrument suitable for a modern stage performance, and wrote music for the instrument. He also made changes to the pipa, increasing the number of frets and used an equal-tempered tuning.

== Compositions ==
Titles in pinyin, Chinese characters and English translation.

=== Erhu ===
- Bìng Zhōng Yín (病中吟) 1918 (recitation of ill-being; Soliloquy of a Convalescent)
- Yuè Yè (月夜) 1924 (moon night)
- Kǔmèn zhī Ōu (苦闷之讴) 1926 (song of melancholy)
- Bēi Gē (悲歌) 1927 (song of lament)
- Liáng Xiāo (良宵) 1928 (beautiful evening)
- Xián Jū Yín (闲居吟) 1928 (recitation of leisure)
- Kōng Shān Niǎo Yǔ (空山鸟语) 1928 (bird song in a desolate mountain)
- Guāngmíng Xíng (光明行) 1931 (towards brightness)
- Dú Xián Cāo (独弦操) 1932 (Étude on a single string)
- Zhú Yĭng Yáo Hóng (烛影摇红) 1932 (shadows of candles, flickering red)
- Studies for Erhu No 1 - 47

=== Pipa ===
- Gē Wǔ Yǐn (歌舞引) (Dance Prelude)
- Gǎi Jìn Cāo (改進操) (Improved Étude)
- Xū Lài (虛籟) 1929 (Sound of Emptiness)

=== Arrangement for ensemble ===
- Variations on Xinshuiling (Chinese: 變體新水令; pinyin: Biàntǐ Xīnshuǐlíng)
