= Liu Bannong =

Chinese poet and linguist (1891-1934)

- 劉半農
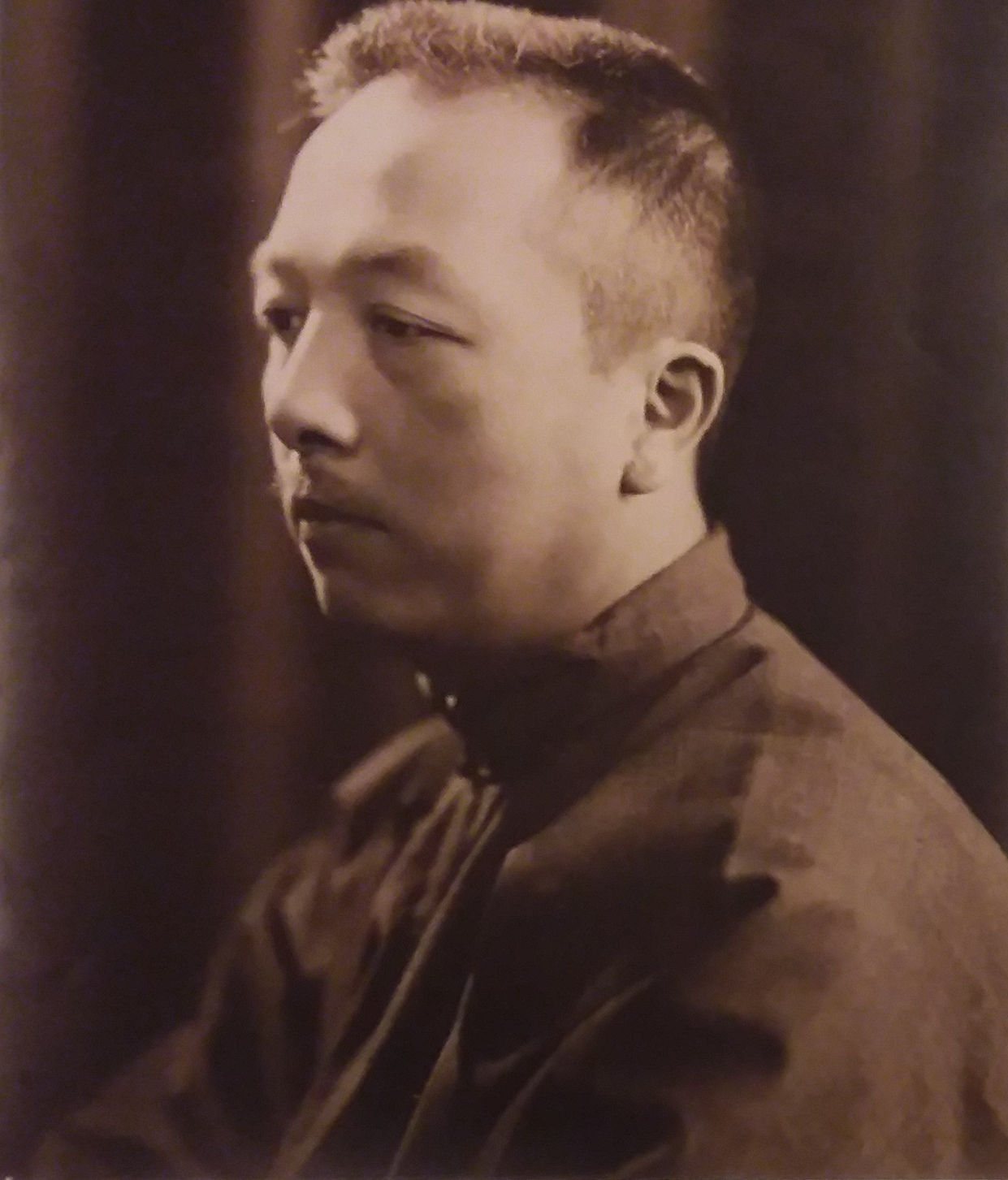
- Born: May 29, 1891; Jiangyin, Jiangsu, China
- Died: July 14, 1934 (aged 43); Beijing, China
- Other names: Liu Fu; Liu Shoupeng
- Occupations: Poet, Linguist

Chinese name
- Traditional Chinese: 劉半農
- Simplified Chinese: 刘半农
Transcriptions
Standard Mandarin
- Hanyu Pinyin: Liú Bànnóng
- Bopomofo: ㄌㄧㄡˊ ㄅㄢˋ ㄋㄨㄥˊ
- IPA: [ljǒʊ pân nʊ̌ŋ]

Liu Bannong (traditional Chinese: 劉半農; simplified Chinese: 刘半农; May 29, 1891 – July 14, 1934) or Liu Fu (劉復; 刘复) was a Chinese poet and linguist. He was a leader in the May Fourth Movement. He made great contributions to modern Chinese literature, phonology and photography.

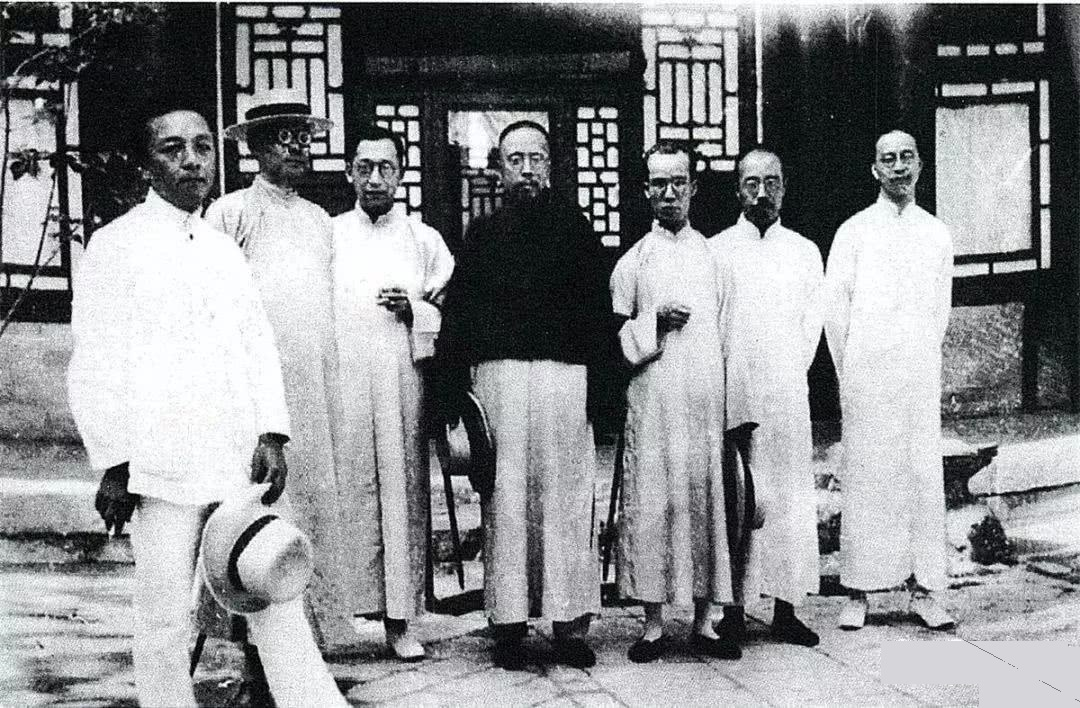
Liu Bannong (leftmost)

== Life ==
A son of the educator Liu Baoshan, Liu Bannong was born in Jiangyin, Jiangsu Province, China. In 1912, he moved to Shanghai and in 1916, his work debuted in New Youth, the most influential journal of the May Fourth New Culture Movement. His essay "My Views on the Change of Written Chinese," published in the May 1917 issue, was a significant piece in promoting modern Chinese language and literature. The same year, Liu took a teaching post at Beijing University, where he began experimenting with using colloquial expressions and folk songs in his poetry. Under his urging, the Beijing University Monthly published folk ballads collected from all over the country, including the 20 "Boat Songs" Liu gathered from his native Jiangyin.

Liu studied in England and France from 1920 to 1925. In 1920, he left China to study linguistics abroad, first in London, then in Paris. He gained his PhD in 1925 at the Institut de Phonétique de la Sorbonne, University of Paris, writing a dissertation on the phonetics and phonology of Chinese tones.

Liu returned to China in 1925, and began a university teaching career. He taught in the field of phonology at colleges in Beijing, and taught Vernacular Literature (小說; xiǎoshuō) in the Department of Humanities and National Literature (文科國文門; wénkē guówén mén) at Peking University. He collaborated with Li Jiarui (李家瑞) to compile Songyuan Yilai Suzi Pu (宋元以來俗字譜 "The vernacular characters used from the Song and Yuan dynasties onwards"). Published in 1930, it was a key work in the standardisation of simplified Chinese characters.

== Personal ==
He was the elder brother of the musicologist Liu Tianhua.

He died of an acute illness after a linguistic research trip to the northwest, at the age of 44.

Lu Xun wrote a short memoir about Liu (憶劉半農君) after his death.

== Literary Achievements ==
Liu began writing poetry in vernacular Chinese in 1917, and was credited with having coined the Chinese feminine pronoun ta (她), which differs from masculine ta (他) and neuter ta (它) only in writing, but not in pronunciation, and which he made use of in his poems. The usage was popularised by the song Jiao Wo Ruhe Bu Xiang Ta (教我如何不想她 "Tell me how to stop thinking of her"), a "pop hit" in the 1930s in China. The lyrics were written by him and the melody by Yuen Ren Chao.

During his time in Paris, he compiled Dunhuang Duosuo (敦煌掇瑣 "Miscellaneous works found in the Dunhuang Caves"), a pioneering work about the Dunhuang manuscripts.

In 1933 Liu Bannong conducted an interview with Sai Jinhua. He wrote The Wife of Zhuangyuan: Sai Jinhua, which he called her "true story".

== Literary Reform ==
Invited by Chen Duxiu, Liu Bannong became an important contributor to the influential magazine New Youth (Xin Qingnian) during the May Fourth Movement, starting from 1916.

He suggested four areas of literary reform in 1917, and proposes to differentiate the concept of literature in Chinese (wenxue) from that of language by resorting to the English definition of literature. More importantly, to clarify the concept of literature, he translated an amount of English linguistic contexts (literature, language, tongue, and speech).

"What is literature? This question has been discussed by many authors. One might argue that 'literature conveys Dao.' But Dao is Dao; literature is literature." —Liu Bannong, "My View on Literary Reform: What is literature?" (我之文學改良觀), 1917.

== Photography ==
Liu was a pioneer in Chinese photography. He called for a photographic style which would be technically advanced but rooted in Chinese tradition. This call was an inspiration to younger photographers such as Lang Jingshan, who established a style of photography which incorporated the aesthetic of Chinese landscape painting. Liu held the opinion that photography should express the author's conception and emotion. This is referred to as "ink and wash painting."

Liu was an active member of the Beijing guangshe (Beijing Photography Society).

Liu has published Bannong tan ying (Bannong on Photography). In which he combined technical instructions with a theoretical discussion of photography, which was the first appearance in China.

== Bibliography ==
=== Poems ===
- How Can I Not Miss Her
- Paper Thin

Liu Bannong created a new form of poetry, called unrhymed poems. He was an important composer of children's poetry.

==== Published Poetry ====
- Wafu ji [瓦釜集/The earthen pot; 1926] ISBN 7999014303
- Yangbian ji [揚鞭集/Flourishing the whip; 1926] ISBN 7505923676

=== Essayistic Writings ===
- Bannong zawen [半農雜文/Mixed writings by Bannong; 1934] ISBN 9787535075017

=== Art Photography ===
- Bannong tan ying [Bannong on Photography; 2000] ISBN 9787800073960

=== Translations ===
- "The Song of the Shirt"
- Dawn by Percival L. Wilde
- La Dame aux Camélias
- Canon of Sherlock Holmes
- Voyage du marchand arabe Sulaymân en Inde et en Chine
- 乾隆英使觐见记

== See also ==
- Shiyun huibian
- New Culture Movement
- May Fourth Movement
- Lu Xun
- Chen Duxiu
- Chinese literature
