= Xinqiao, Jiangyin =

Xinqiao 新桥镇
- Town
- Interactive map of Xinqiao
- Coordinates: 31°47′55″N 120°30′56″E
- Country: People's Republic of China
- Province: Jiangsu
- Prefecture-level city: Wuxi
- County-level city: Jiangyin
- Elevation: 7 m (23 ft)
- Time zone: UTC+8 (China Standard)
- Postal code: 214421
- Area code: 0510

Xinqiao (simplified Chinese: 新桥; traditional Chinese: 新橋; pinyin: Xīnqiáo) is located in the south-east of Jiangyin City in Jiangsu province. It covers a total area of 19.3 square kilometres and has a population of 50,000, making it the smallest town of Jiangyin.

Xinqiao is the biggest textile industry base of clothing all over the world. It fosters the growth of Sunshine Group, Heilan Group and Jingya Group.

Since 2001, Xinqiao has implemented the strategy of "Three Concentrations" and "The European Town". Xinqiao sticks to the principle of "Chinese elements expressed in international ways and European elements expressed in Chinese ways" and focuses on the combination of the European style and its own style, with Heilan Equestrian Club as its landmark.

On October 31, 2011, Xinqiao was entitled the "International Garden City" and presented with a special award of landscape improvement in Seoul.

== See also ==
- List of township-level divisions of Jiangsu
