= Jiangyin =

Jiangyin 江阴市 Kiangyin
- County-level city
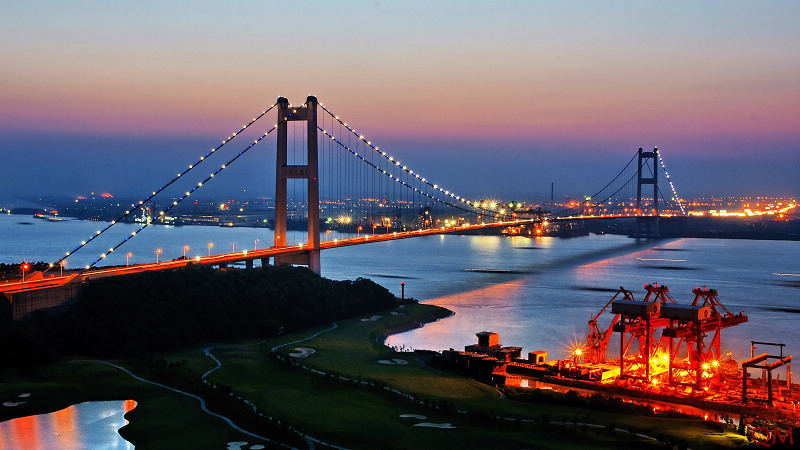
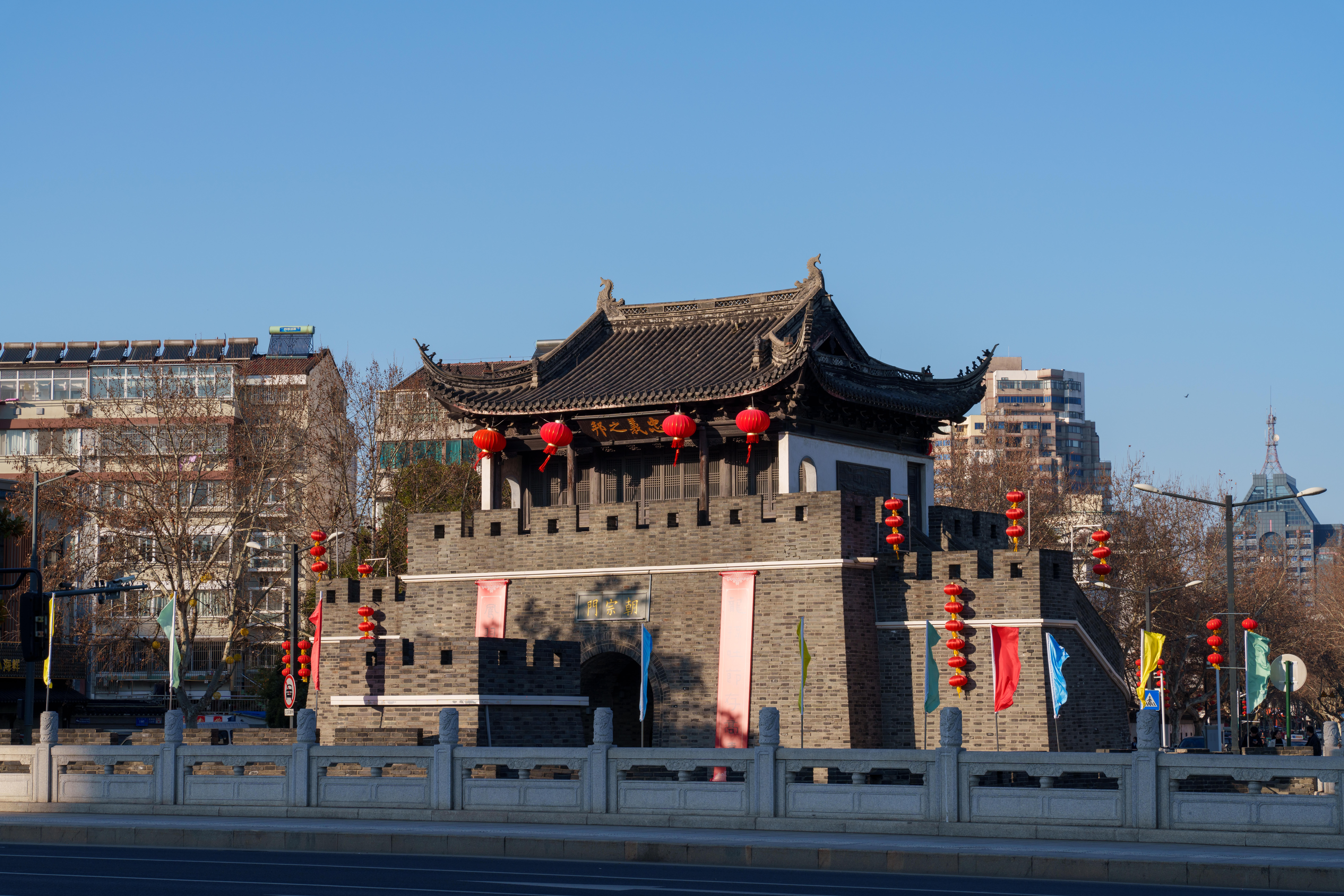
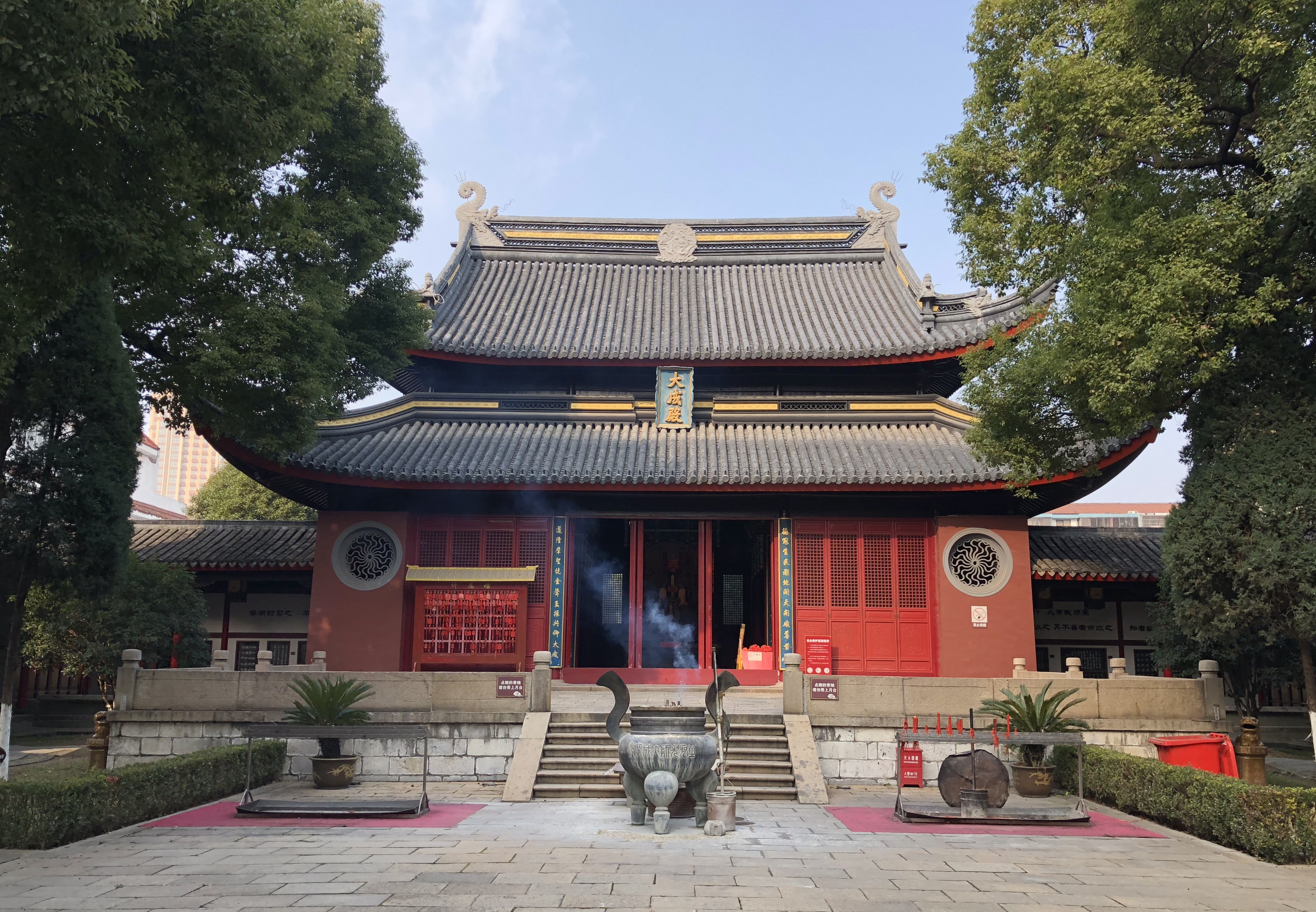
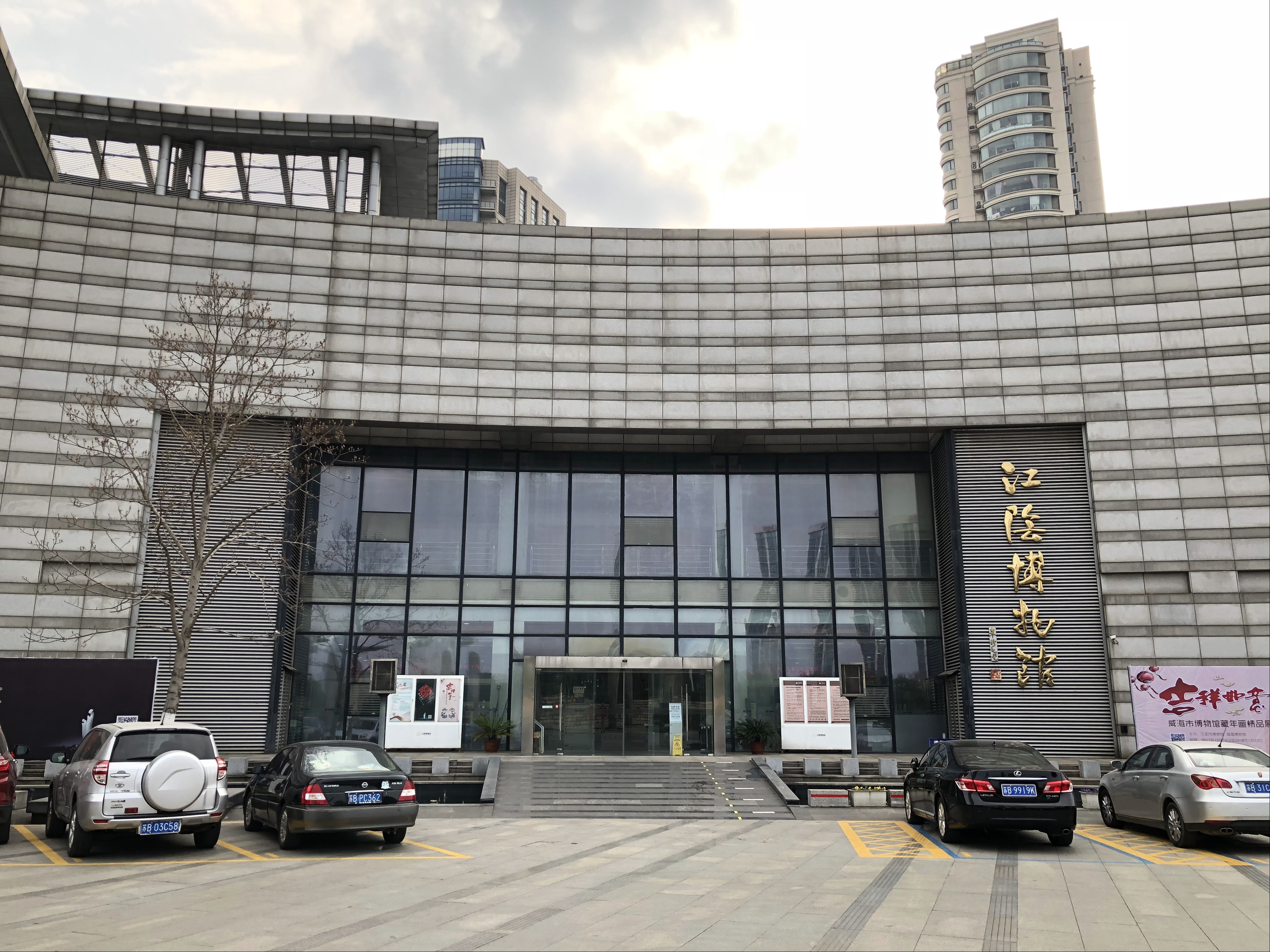
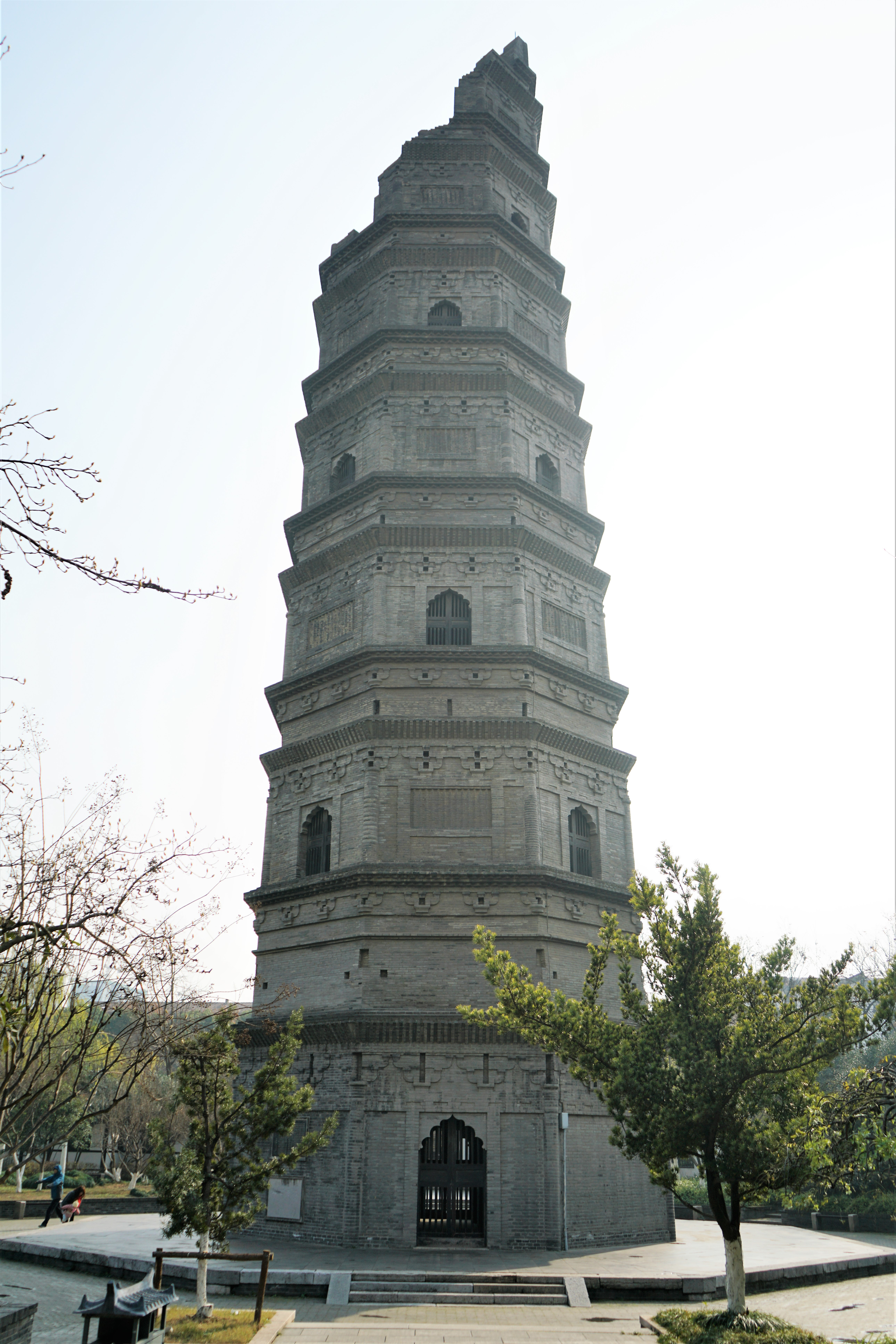
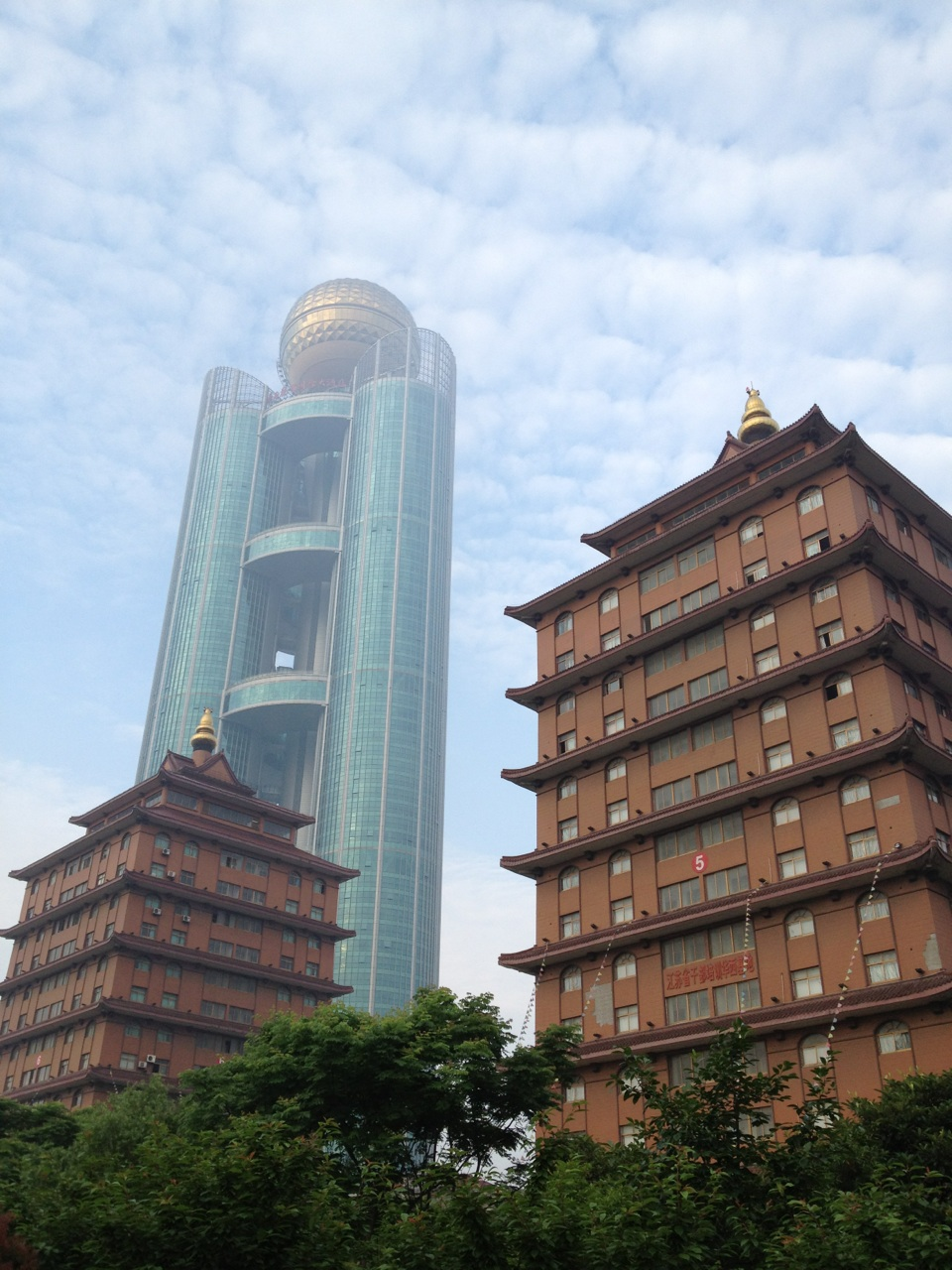
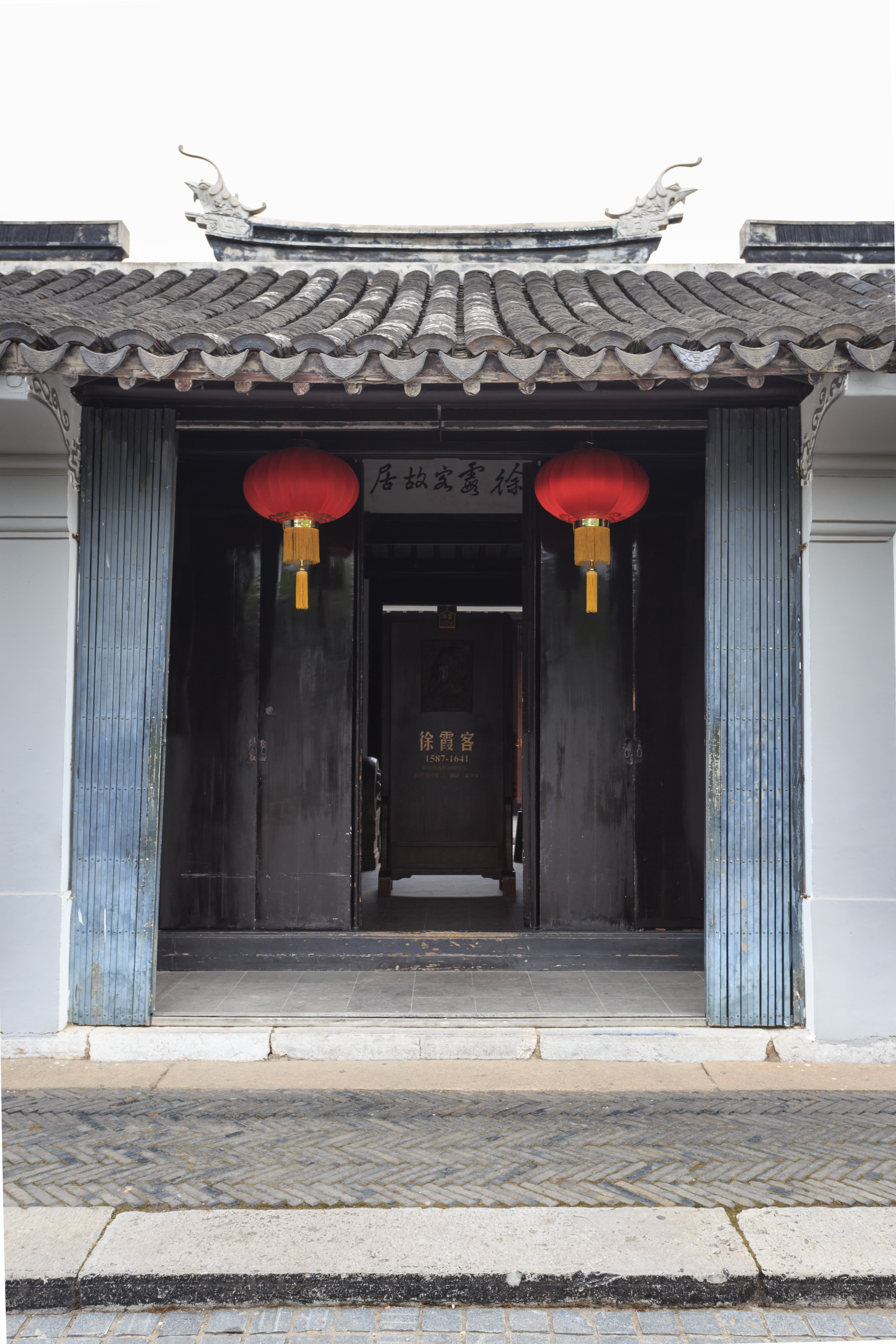
- Jiangyin Yangtze River Bridge Gate of Chaozong Jiangyin Confucian Temple Jiangyin Museum Xingguo Temple Pagoda Village of Huaxi Former Residence of Xu Xiake

- Location within Jiangsu Location within China
- Coordinates: 31°50′20″N 120°17′42″E
- Country: People's Republic of China
- Province: Jiangsu
- Prefecture-level city: Wuxi

Government
  - Party Secretary: Chen Jinhu (陈金虎)
  - Mayor: Cai Yeming (蔡叶明)

Area
  - County-level city: 987.53 km^{2} (381.29 sq mi)
  - Metro: 2,415.5 km^{2} (932.6 sq mi)

Population (2010 census)
  - County-level city: 1,595,138
  - Density: 1,615.3/km^{2} (4,183.6/sq mi)
  - Urban: 1,595,138
  - Metro: 3,526,260
  - Metro density: 1,459.8/km^{2} (3,781.0/sq mi)
- Time zone: UTC+8 (China Standard Time)
- Postal code: 214400
- Area code: 0510
- License plates prefix: 苏B
- Website: www.jiangyin.gov.cn

Jiangyin (simplified Chinese: 江阴; traditional Chinese: 江陰; pinyin: Jiāngyīn; Wade–Giles: Chiangyin, Jiangyin dialect: [kɐ̞ŋ.jɪŋ]) is a county-level city on the southern bank of the Yangtze River. It is administered by the prefecture-level city of Wuxi, Jiangsu province. Jiangyin is an important transport hub on the Yangtze River and one of the most developed counties in China. It had 1,595,138 inhabitants in the 2010 census. The city is part of the Jiangyin-Zhangjiagang-Jingjiang metropolitan area, which has 3,526,260 inhabitants.

== Etymology ==
Jiangyin's name means "River Shade", from its location on the southern, shady bank of the Yangtze River.

== History ==
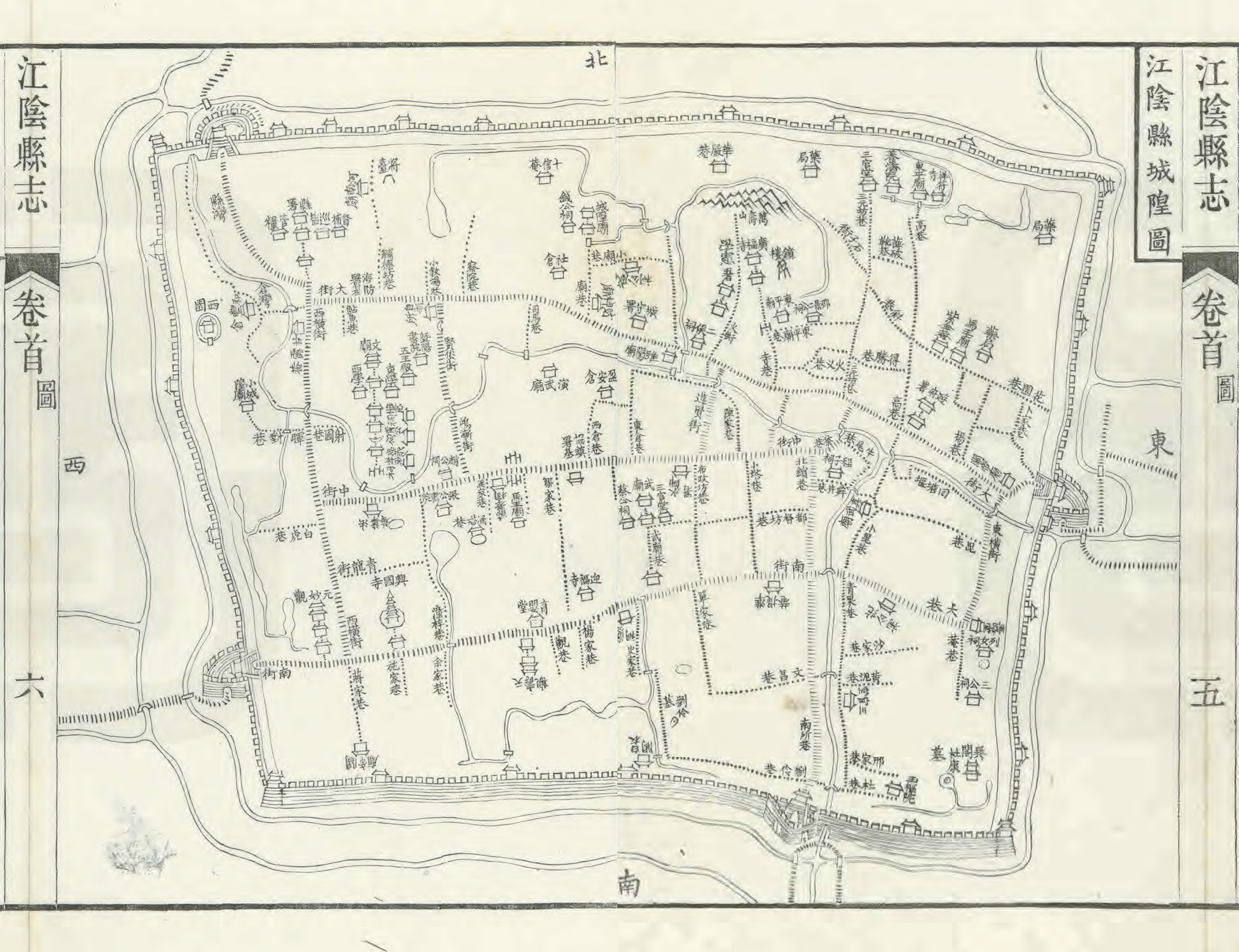
The walled city of Jiangyin in 1840

=== Imperial era ===
Historically, the area was known as a part of Jiyang (暨陽). The presence of Jiyang Township is documented as early as the Han dynasty, when it fell under the jurisdiction of Yanling county (with its seat at present-day Changzhou).

The tomb of Prince Jizha (季札) of Wu is located in Shen'gang (申港) within Jiyang, where there was once a temple dedicated to his memory; particularly during the late imperial era, sacrifices and festivals were held there every year at a fixed time.

In 557, Jiangyin county was created from the territory of Jinling (formerly Piling), concurrently serving as the seat of the newly established Jiangyin commandery. Following the Sui conquest of the Chen dynasty in 589, the commandery was abolished while Jiangyin was retained as a county.

Elevated to a military prefecture during the Southern Tang, Jiangyin alternated between this status and county status under Changzhou three times. It was finally re-established as a military prefecture in 1161, a status it maintained until the Yuan dynasty.

By the mid-11th century, Jiangyin had already emerged as a major port for overseas vessels. Following the loss of northern territories and the increasing demand for foreign trade, it replaced Mizhou in Shandong as the primary entrepot for trade with Goryeo and Japan.

In 1146, the Song government formally established the Jiangyin Maritime Trade Office (市舶務), which operated under the jurisdiction of the Liangzhe Maritime Trade Supervisorate.

The county became a zhou (smaller prefecture) during the Yuan dynasty, but was reduced to county status again in 1367.

In 1472, a sandbank in the Yangtze River was made independent from Jiangyin county to establish Jingjiang county.

The head‑shaving decree triggered a wave of resistance across the Yangtze Delta in the summer of 1645. In Jiangyin, police officials who had been negotiating the transfer of authority revolted, killed the newly appointed Qing magistrate, and fortified the city.

The movement united lower‑level clerks, urban literati, and local peasants in opposition to the conquest. Chen Mingyu (陳明遇), the county jailer (dianshi), assumed overall direction and secured financial backing from Huizhou merchants, before inviting his predecessor Yan Yingyuan (閻應元) to serve as military commander. The resistance lasted 81 days before Qing reinforcements breached the walls with cannonade on 9 October 1645.

The ensuing massacre—among the most devastating in the Yangtze Delta—claimed an estimated tens of thousands of lives within the city walls. Together with the massacres at Yangzhou and Jiading, the event was later commemorated at the turn of the twentieth century as one of the "Three Great Tragedies of the Late Ming."

Recurring tensions over grain tax remissions in Jiangyin culminated in a 1768 protest in the western district, resulting in the arrest of more than 120 locals for demanding further tax adjustments.

In addition to its role as a county seat, the walled city of Jiangyin served as the headquarters for several regional supervisory agencies during the Ming and Qing dynasties. It hosted the Intendant of the Changzhou–Zhenjiang Military Defense Circuit, which was reorganized as the General Surveillance and Military Defense Circuit in the early Qing.

From 1614 onward, Jiangyin became the residence of the educational censor for the eastern part of the Southern Metropolitan Region, a post that in the Qing period evolved into the provincial education commissioner of Jiangsu.

Against this administrative backdrop, the provincial education commissioner Huang Tifang founded the Nanjing Academy (南菁書院) in 1884, which became a site for "statecraft" scholarship. The academy published major compendia of Qing administrative writings, most notably the Collected Writings on Statecraft of the Qing Dynasty: Second Compilation (皇朝經世文續編).

=== Modern era ===
Following the Wuchang Uprising, Jiangyin declared peaceful independence from Qing government on 8 November 1911. The transition was managed by a "public league" (gongtuan) composed of the local chamber of commerce and other elites, who assumed control over financial, police, and judicial affairs while retaining the former magistrate to ensure administrative continuity. Besides, the garrison at the Jiangyin Fortress also defected from the Qing.

Completed in 1926, the Jiangyin wharf of the Chung Hwa Godown Company (中華碼頭公司) served as a major transshipment hub for Kailuan's coal moving into the inland waterway network, facilitating the distribution of fuel to the region's interior. In April 1929, construction began on the Xicheng macadam road (Wuxi-Jiangyin Road, 錫澄公路), which opened to traffic in August 1930. Thereafter, merchants and travelers from north of the Yangtze, after crossing the river, increasingly preferred to use this road to travel to Shanghai and Nanjing.

Following the Nanking incident of 1927, Admiral Clarence S. Williams suggested that the United States naval authorities carry out a "progressive bombardment of the Yangtse River forts beginning at Kiangyin" as one of retaliatory measures.

By early 1935, the Nationalist government had formulated a mine-laying plan along the Jiangyin–Zhenjiang river corridor. In May 1936, the Torpedo Academy (電雷學校) under the Ministry of Military Affairs was relocated to Jiangyin. Preparations for riverine mining and shore fortifications were completed before the outbreak of hostilities. On 30 July 1937, the Military Affairs Commission appointed Ouyang Ge, the Academy's principal, as commander of the Jiangyin River Defence Sector.

In mid-August 1937, Chinese commanders decided to blockade the Yangtze at Jiangyin to prevent Japanese naval forces from advancing upriver toward Nanjing. On 12 August, six Nationalist warships scuttled eight obsolete naval vessels and twenty merchant ships along with the others as blockships in the river northeast of the city, while additional units were deployed to reinforce the riverine defenses.

Japanese naval aircraft began attacking the Jiangyin defenses on 16 August. Sustained aerial bombardment severely degraded the Chinese First Fleet, whose surviving crews shifted to shore-based positions and continued resistance with salvaged guns. Japanese naval forces—comprising the Third Fleet, three carrier divisions, and two combined air groups—were deployed to break the Jiangyin blockade over the following months.

By late November, Japanese ground forces had outflanked the Xicheng defensive line (Wuxi-Jiangyin line, 錫澄線) linking Jiangyin fortress to Wuxi. The Siege of Jiangyin Fortress was the last major engagement before the Japanese advance on Nanjing; the defense delayed the Japanese Yangtze crossing until 9 December 1937.

In 1941, during the Second Sino-Japanese War, the Chinese Communist Party and its affiliated New Fourth Army established four county-level governments within and around the territory of Jiangyin: Jiangyin County, Chengdong County (also known as Yuxi), Chengxi County, and Shazhou County.

On April 22, 1949, Jiangyin came under the administration of the Changzhou Special District (常州专区) within the Southern Jiangsu Administrative Office (苏南行署) after the founding of the People's Republic of China. On February 6, 1953, it was transferred to the Suzhou Special District (苏州专区). In 1961 (officially approved on November 29, 1957 and implemented on December 1, 1961), nine communes in the northeastern part of Jiangyin County were reassigned to form the new Shazhou County (now Zhangjiagang City).

On January 18, 1983, Jiangsu Province implemented a "municipal-over-county" administrative system reform, under which Jiangyin County became administratively subordinate to the prefecture-level city of Wuxi.

On 23 April 1987, the State Council of China approved Jiangyin's designation as a county-level city.

== Administrative divisions ==
Currently, Jiangyin City has 5 subdistricts and 11 towns.

5 subdistricts

- Chengjiang (澄江街道)
- Shengang (申港街道)
- Xiagang (夏港街道)
- Nanzha (南闸街道)
- Yunting (云亭街道)

11 towns

- Huangtu (璜土镇)
- Ligang (利港镇)
- Yuecheng (月城镇)
- Qingyang (青阳镇)
- Xuxiake (徐霞客镇)
- Huashi (华士镇)
- Zhouzhuang (周庄镇)
- Xinqiao (新桥镇)
- Changjing (长泾镇)
- Gushan (顾山镇)
- Zhutang (祝塘镇)

== Transport ==
=== Rail ===
Jiangyin Train Ferry Line is the only one train line that remains across the Yangtze River. It is a part of the Xinyi–Changxing Railway.

A new high-speed railway line has been constructed that links Jiangyin directly to both Shanghai and Nanjing. Furthermore, it is connected to Wuxi by an extension to the existing Wuxi Metro.

== Natural Conditions ==
=== Geography ===
Jiangyin is located in the southern part of Jiangsu Province, China, between 31°40′34″ and 31°57′36″ north latitude, and 119°59′00″ to 120°34′30″ east longitude. It lies at the northern end of the Yangtze River Delta and the 太湖平原. The city is situated north of the Yangtze River, facing Jingjiang across the river; to the south, it borders Taihu Lake and is adjacent to urban districts of Wuxi (Xishan District and Huishan District); to the west it neighbors Changzhou, and to the east, it connects to Zhangjiagang and Changshu under the jurisdiction of Suzhou. Located in the geometric center of the "Golden Triangle" formed by Suzhou, Wuxi, and Changzhou, Jiangyin has convenient transportation and has historically served as an important transportation hub between northern and southern China, as well as a natural port for integrated river-sea transport and transshipment along the Yangtze River.

=== Climate ===
Jiangyin has a humid subtropical climate (Köppen Cfa) influenced by the East Asian monsoon, characterized by cold, dry, and mostly clear winters, and hot, humid summers with thunderstorms. It features mild temperatures, abundant rainfall, and distinct four seasons. The annual average precipitation is 1234.0 mm (48.58 in) with a maximum recorded of 2207.9 mm (86.93 in) in 2016 and a minimum of 581.8 mm (22.91 in) in 1978. The average annual temperature is 16.7 °C (62.1 °F), with the highest average temperature recorded at 18.6 °C (65.5 °F) in 2025 and the lowest at 14.5 °C (58.1 °F) in 1957 & 1980. The highest temperature recorded was 41.3 °C (106.3 °F) on August 6, 2013, and the lowest was -14.2 °C (6.4 °F) on January 31, 1977. The average annual sunshine duration is approximately 1931 hours.

Climate data for Jiangyin, elevation 4 m (13 ft), (1991–2020 normals, extremes 1977–present)
Month	Jan	Feb	Mar	Apr	May	Jun	Jul	Aug	Sep	Oct	Nov	Dec	Year
Record high °C (°F)	21.3 (70.3)	26.8 (80.2)	33.9 (93.0)	34.3 (93.7)	37.7 (99.9)	38.2 (100.8)	40.6 (105.1)	41.3 (106.3)	37.8 (100.0)	37.7 (99.9)	30.3 (86.5)	23.2 (73.8)	41.3 (106.3)
Mean daily maximum °C (°F)	7.7 (45.9)	10.1 (50.2)	14.8 (58.6)	21.1 (70.0)	26.3 (79.3)	29.1 (84.4)	32.8 (91.0)	32.3 (90.1)	28.2 (82.8)	23.1 (73.6)	17.1 (62.8)	10.4 (50.7)	21.1 (70.0)
Daily mean °C (°F)	3.8 (38.8)	5.9 (42.6)	10.1 (50.2)	16.0 (60.8)	21.3 (70.3)	24.9 (76.8)	28.7 (83.7)	28.3 (82.9)	24.2 (75.6)	18.7 (65.7)	12.7 (54.9)	6.3 (43.3)	16.7 (62.1)
Mean daily minimum °C (°F)	0.9 (33.6)	2.5 (36.5)	6.3 (43.3)	11.6 (52.9)	17.1 (62.8)	21.4 (70.5)	25.5 (77.9)	25.2 (77.4)	21.0 (69.8)	15.0 (59.0)	9.0 (48.2)	3.0 (37.4)	13.2 (55.8)
Record low °C (°F)	−14.2 (6.4)	−8.3 (17.1)	−4.0 (24.8)	0.8 (33.4)	7.4 (45.3)	12.7 (54.9)	18.6 (65.5)	17.9 (64.2)	10.7 (51.3)	1.3 (34.3)	−3.4 (25.9)	−10.0 (14.0)	−14.2 (6.4)
Average precipitation mm (inches)	59.5 (2.34)	57.0 (2.24)	77.7 (3.06)	78.1 (3.07)	96.8 (3.81)	213.4 (8.40)	210.8 (8.30)	190.7 (7.51)	93.7 (3.69)	63.6 (2.50)	54.4 (2.14)	38.3 (1.51)	1,234 (48.57)
Average precipitation days (≥ 0.1 mm)	9.8	9.4	11.0	10.5	11.1	12.5	12.7	13.0	8.8	7.5	8.3	7.4	122
Average snowy days	3.1	2.7	0.9	0	0	0	0	0	0	0	0.2	1.1	8
Average relative humidity (%)	73	72	70	69	70	77	78	78	76	73	73	70	73
Mean monthly sunshine hours	126.8	129.7	154.5	178.4	186.3	142.6	189.1	195.7	170.6	170.3	143.0	144.0	1,931
Percentage possible sunshine	40	41	41	46	44	34	44	48	47	49	46	46	44
Source: China Meteorological Administration all-time January high

=== Geology ===
Land subsidence refers to the lowering of the ground surface over a certain area. Jiangyin is classified as a water-quality-related water-scarce region. Due to the overexploitation of underground water resources, the groundwater level in Jiangyin has gradually declined, resulting in a large underground "cone of depression." This condition significantly increases the risk of land subsidence. In some local areas, cumulative subsidence has reached over 1 meter. Geological hazards such as ground fissures and surface collapse have also occurred, especially in Changjing Town, Xiake Town, and surrounding areas. Currently, with the implementation of strict measures such as banning deep wells and groundwater extraction, as well as the construction of regional water treatment plants and water supply pipe networks, land subsidence and other geological hazards have been effectively curbed.

== Urban Population ==
By the end of 2019, Jiangyin had a household-registered population of 1,264,100 and a permanent resident population of 1,653,400. That year saw 8,733 live births (birth rate: 6.93‰) and 8,340 deaths (death rate: 6.62‰), resulting in a natural growth rate of 0.31‰. The average life expectancy in the city reached 82.32 years.

According to the Seventh National Population Census (as of November 1, 2020), Jiangyin had a permanent resident population of 1,779,515, comprising 920,161 males (51.71%) and 859,354 females (48.29%).

== Economy ==
=== Gross Domestic Product ===
In 2022, Jiangyin reported a total Gross Domestic Product (GDP) of ¥475.418 billion, representing a year-on-year growth of 2.3%. The per capita GDP reached ¥266,600.

The value-added by sector was as follows:

- Primary industry: ¥3.96 billion (up 1.6%)
- Secondary industry: ¥247.363 billion (up 2.0%)
- Tertiary industry: ¥224.095 billion (up 2.5%)

The ratio of the three sectors was 0.8:52.0:47.2. A total of 67,000 job opportunities were created during the year, with 30,300 new urban jobs and 5,735 reemployed individuals from urban disadvantaged groups. The surveyed urban unemployment rate was kept around 5%.

In support of entrepreneurship, 9,600 individuals started their own businesses, generating employment for 30,000 people. Government subsidies for entrepreneurship totaled ¥10.75 million, and guaranteed loans for entrepreneurship reached ¥31.93 million.

By the end of 2022, Jiangyin had 256,181 registered domestic market entities (up 5.5%), including 85,973 enterprises (up 3.9%) and 169,626 individual businesses (up 6.4%). Among enterprises, 3,845 were state- or collectively-owned, and 82,128 were private enterprises. The city also had 582 registered farmers' cooperatives.

=== Fiscal Revenue ===
By the end of 2022, Jiangyin's general public budget revenue totaled ¥22.683 billion. After accounting for VAT rebates, this represented a 6.8% decline year-on-year. Tax revenue reached ¥17.868 billion, down 8.6% under comparable conditions. General public budget expenditure was ¥24.459 billion, marking a 9.0% decrease from the previous year.

The balance of domestic and foreign currency deposits in financial institutions reached ¥537.522 billion, a 14.7% increase compared to the beginning of the year. Total loans stood at ¥424.991 billion, up 11.0%.

Among deposits, non-financial corporate deposits reached ¥246.272 billion (up 16.4%), and household deposits reached ¥214.711 billion (up 21.5%). On the lending side, loans to non-financial enterprises and government institutions amounted to ¥340.168 billion (up 11.8%), while household loans totaled ¥83.968 billion (up 7.8%).

As of the end of the year, Jiangyin had 447,400 securities accounts, up 5.4% from the beginning of the year. The total transaction volume by securities institutions was ¥1.1144 trillion, down 13.1%. The city was home to 59 listed companies, including 21 listed overseas and 38 listed domestically. Among the domestic listings, 16 were on the Shanghai Main Board, 13 on the Shenzhen Main Board, and 9 on the ChiNext Market.

Jiangyin recorded ¥8.993 billion in total insurance premiums, a 3.8% increase year-on-year. Of this, property insurance premiums accounted for ¥2.620 billion (up 4.9%), and life insurance premiums amounted to ¥6.372 billion (up 3.3%).

=== Industry and Construction ===
Jiangyin has a strong industrial foundation. Its industrial development began with traditional handicrafts during the Ming dynasty, was shaped by domestic capitalism in the late Qing dynasty, and surged after China's Reform and Opening-up in 1978 with the rise of township and village enterprises. The city benefited from three key phases: (1) the rise of grassroots industry in the early reform era, (2) the large-scale development of Shanghai's Pudong area in the 1990s, and (3) the Jiangsu Riverside Development Strategy and export-driven economy of the early 2000s.

In 2022, the total operating income of industries above designated size in Jiangyin reached ¥670.7 billion, a decrease of 4.7%. The product sales rate was 96.7%, down 1.5 percentage points. Total industrial profits reached ¥43.248 billion, an increase of 8.4%. Loss-making enterprises accounted for 17.8% of all above-scale enterprises, up 3.1 percentage points from the previous year, and total losses increased by ¥1.53 billion to ¥3.801 billion.

Out of 19 key products tracked, 8 saw production growth. Total electricity consumption for industrial use was 23.099 billion kWh, a 7.1% decrease.

The city's top 100 industrial enterprises achieved ¥433.063 billion in revenue and ¥35.098 billion in profits, accounting for 64.5% and 81.2% of above-scale industrial totals, respectively. Two enterprise groups—Hailan Group and CITIC Pacific Special Steel—recorded tax-based sales exceeding ¥100 billion. Two others—New Changjiang Industrial Group and Sanfangxiang Group—exceeded ¥50 billion, and four more—including Jiangsu Sunshine Group, Shuangliang Group, Envision Energy, and Huaxi Group—exceeded ¥30 billion.

In 2022, the total output value of the construction industry reached ¥12.431 billion, growing by 7.5%. The city earned one Jiangsu Province "Yangtze Cup" Quality Project award, 13 Wuxi "Taihu Cup" Quality Project awards, and 2 "Taihu Cup" awards for municipal infrastructure. Additionally, there were 19 provincial-level star-rated construction sites and 3 outstanding residential projects recognized by the province.

=== Agriculture ===
In 2022, Jiangyin's total grain output reached 130,900 tonnes, an increase of 0.3%. Of this, cereals accounted for 124,300 tonnes, up 0.2%. The total vegetable output was 393,000 tonnes, a slight increase of 0.1%, while fruit production reached 74,084 tonnes, down 0.4%.

The grain cultivation area was 19.14 thousand hectares, increasing by 0.13 thousand hectares compared to the previous year. The vegetable planting area was 12.27 thousand hectares, down by 0.01 thousand hectares, and the fruit planting area decreased by 0.06 thousand hectares to 2.51 thousand hectares.

In terms of animal husbandry, 25,200 pigs were slaughtered during the year, a decrease of 9.7%, and pork production was 1,984 tonnes, down 10.3%. The dairy cow inventory rose to 995 heads, up 42.3%, with milk output totaling 3,709 tonnes, an increase of 25.2%. Aquatic product output reached 20,169 tonnes, up by 0.5%.

== Notable people ==
- Li Jinjun, Chinese (PRC) Ambassador to North Korea (DPRK) (from 2015)
- Liu Bannong (1891–1934) - writer
- Liu Tianhua (1895–1932) - musician and composer
- Miao Quansun (缪荃孙) (1844–1919) - Academic, catalog writer, bibliophile, founder of modern Chinese librarianship
- Shangguan Yunzhu - movie star
- Xu Xiake (1587–1641) - noted traveller and geographer
- Yu Minhong - chairman and President of New Oriental Education & Technology Group

== See also ==
- Jiangyin Yangtze River Bridge
- Huaxi Village
