= People's Publishing House (disambiguation) =

People's Publishing House is China's state-run publishing house.

People's Publishing House may also refer to:

== China ==
- Shanghai People's Publishing House, China
- Hubei People's Publishing House, China
- Inner Mongolia People's Publishing House, China
- Tibet People's Publishing House, China
- Yanbian People's Publishing House, China
- Yunnan People's Publishing House, China
- People's Literature Publishing House, China

== India ==
- People's Publishing House (India)
