= Labor (magazine) =

Labor (simplified Chinese: 《劳动》; traditional Chinese: 《勞動》; pinyin: Láodòng) was a Chinese anarchist magazine founded in March 1918, and the first labor magazine in China. Its founders included Wu Zhihui, Liang Bingxin and Liu Shixin (younger brother of Liu Shifu).

== History ==
On the eve of the May Fourth Movement, anarchism was widespread in China.

In March 1918, Wu Zhihui, Liang Bingxian and others founded the monthly magazine in Shanghai to promote the labor movement. Wu Zhihui set the purpose of the Labor as "to respect labor; to advocate laborism; to maintain proper labor and exclude improper labor ... to promote the unity of laborers in China and the world to solve social problems". In the same month, the magazine published an article praising the October Revolution.

The magazine published only five issues and was then discontinued.
