= Yi Peiji =

Chinese politician and educator (1880–1937)

- 易培基
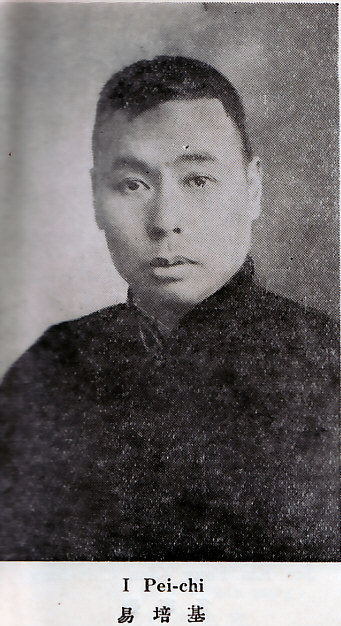
- Yi Peiji

Director of National Palace Museum
- In office 5 March 1929 – 17 November 1930
- Preceded by: New title
- Succeeded by: Ma Heng

Minister of Agricultural and Mineral
- In office 18 October 1928 – 17 November 1930
- Preceded by: New title
- Succeeded by: H. H. Kung

Minister of Education
- In office 31 December 1925 – 14 March 1926
- Preceded by: Zhang Shizhao
- Succeeded by: Ma Junwu

President of Hunan First Normal University
- In office June 1920 – January 1924
- Preceded by: Qin Hanhuan
- Succeeded by: Li Jimin

Personal details
- Born: 28 February 1880 Changsha, Hunan, Qing Empire
- Died: September 1937 (aged 57) Shanghai, Republic of China
- Party: Kuomintang
- Education: Wuhan University
- Occupation: Politician, scholar, educator

Yi Peiji (Chinese: 易培基; pinyin: Yì Péijī; 28 February 1880 – September 1937) was a Chinese politician, scholar, and educator.

== Life and career ==
Yi was born in Changsha, Hunan, on February 28, 1880. He graduated from Hubei Fangyan College (now Wuhan University), then he went to Japan to study under Zhang Taiyan.

After the establishment of Republic of China, he became a secretary of Li Yuanhong. Then he taught at Changsha Normal College and Hunan First Normal University, his students included Mao Zedong, Cai Hesen, Xiao Zisheng, Xiao San, He Shuheng, Li Weihan, and Li Lisan.

He held the three responsibilities of president of Hunan Provincial Library, secretary-general of Hunan government, and president of Hunan First Normal University from June 1920 to November 1920. Then he served as president of Beijing Women's Normal University (now Beijing Normal University). He was Minister of Education in December 1925, and held that office until March 1926. In 1927 he became president of National Labor University, a position he held until September 1930. He served as minister of Agricultural and Mineral between October 1928 to November 1930. In March 1929, he was appointed director of National Palace Museum, he remained in that position until November 1930, when he was appointed president of National Beiping Normal College (now Beijing Normal University).

He died of illness in Shanghai in September 1937.

Government offices
Previous: Huang Fu	Acting Minister of Education; 1924–1924	Succeeded by Wang Jiuling (王九齡)
Preceded by Zhang Shizhao	Minister of Education; 1925–1926	Succeeded by Ma Junwu
New title	Minister of Agricultural and Mineral; 1928–1930	Succeeded by H. H. Kung
New title	Director of National Palace Museum; 1929–1930	Succeeded by Ma Heng (馬衡)
Educational offices
Preceded by Qin Hanhuan (覃漢寰)	President of Hunan First Normal University; 1920–1924	Succeeded by Li Jimin (李濟民)
