= Sha Gan =

Chinese anarchist (1885–1913)

Shā Gàn
- 沙淦
- Born: 1885; Li Kuanyintang, Xingren, Tongzhou, Nantong, Jiangsu
- Died: 10 July 1913 (aged 27–28); Nantong, Jiangsu
- Citizenship: Qing Empire (1885–1912); Republic of China (1912–1913)
- Occupation: Politician
- Political party: Tongmenghui (1905–1912); Socialist Party (1912); Pure Socialist Party (1912–1913)
- Movement: Chinese anarchism

Shā Gàn (Chinese: 沙淦; 1885 – 10 July 1913) was a Chinese revolutionary socialist of the early Republican period. An advocate of "pure socialism", he opposed the state and all forms of authority, and advocated for the establishment of communism. He was executed for his revolutionary activities during the Second Revolution of 1913.

== Biography ==
Shā Gàn was born in 1885. Following the Xinhai Revolution of 1911, he joined the Chinese Socialist Party. He came to lead the party's far-left and anti-statist faction, which clashed with other factions of the party. Shā's "pure socialist" faction gained the support of the Buddhist anarchist Taixu, who became one of his closest collaborators.

Despite efforts by party founder Jiang Kanghu to mediate between them, the factions were ultimately irreconcilable and the party split. After the party's national conference in November 1912, Shā Gàn's faction broke away and formed the Pure Socialist Party. It called for the overthrow of all authority, including the abolition of the nation state, class stratification and the nuclear family. It also advocated for a world revolution and the establishment of communism, which saw the party banned by the Beiyang government only a week after it was founded.

Following the outbreak of the Second Revolution in 1913, Shā Gàn took up arms against the Beiyang government, organising a socialist militant group called the Dare-to-Die Corps (Chinese: 敢死队, romanized: gan si dui). In the repression that followed, the Beiyang authorities arrested Shā Gàn in Caishikou. Together with fellow party activist Chen Yilong, he was found guilty of sedition and sentenced to death. The two were beheaded. The party was ultimately disbanded during the crackdown.

== Bibliography ==
- Henshaw, Jonathan (2019). Serving the occupation state : Chinese elites, collaboration and the problem of history in post-war China (PhD). University of British Columbia. doi:10.14288/1.0379559. hdl:2429/70737.
- Jiang, Yihua (2012). "A brief history of Chinese socialist thought in the past century". Journal of Modern Chinese History. 6 (2): 147–163. doi:10.1080/17535654.2012.718604.
- Müller-Saini, Gotelind (2006). "Thinking Globally, Acting Locally: Chinese Anarchists between National and International Concerns (1900-1930s)". In Kirby, William C.; Leutner, Mechthild; Mühlhahn, Klaus (eds.). Global Conjectures: China in Transnational Perspective. LIT Verlag. pp. 103–120.
- Ritzinger, Justin (2017). "Portrait of the Master as a Young Anarchist". Anarchy in the pure land: Reinventing the cult of Maitreya in modern Chinese Buddhism. Oxford University Press. pp. 27–71. ISBN 9780190491161.
- Smith, S. A. (2002). Like Cattle and Horses: Nationalism and Labor in Shanghai, 1895-1927. Duke University Press. ISBN 9780822327936.
