= Yanbian People's Publishing House =

Yanbian People's Press
- Status: Active
- Founded: August 19, 1951
- Headquarters location: Yanji
- Official website: www.ybcbs.com

Yanbian People's Publishing House (traditional Chinese: 延邊人民出版社; simplified Chinese: 延边人民出版社), commonly known as Yanbian People's Press, is a Yanji-based publishing house in the People's Republic of China. It is the first publishing house established in Jilin Province after the founding of PRC.

Established on August 19, 1951, Yanbian People's Press is an ethnic publishing house that integrates comprehensive, local and ethnic features.

== Important published books ==
- Brief History of the Korean Nationality (朝鲜族简史), 1986.
- History of Thought of Joseon Philosophy (朝鲜哲学思想史), 1989.
- The East Manchurian Base in the Period of War of Liberation (解放战争时期的东满根据地), 1991.
- The Year book of Yanbian Statistics (延边统计年鉴), 2001.
- Complete Collection of Historical Materials on the Korean Ethnic Group in China (中国朝鲜族史料全集), 2014.
