= Tibet People's Publishing House =

- Status: Active
- Founded: December 28, 1963
- Headquarters location: Lhasa

Tibet People's Publishing House (Chinese: 西藏人民出版社), also translated into English as Tibet People's Press or Tibetan People's Publishing House or Xizang People's Publishing House, is a Lhasa-based publishing house in the People's Republic of China.

On December 28, 1963, the Ministry of Culture of China approved the establishment of Tibet People's Publishing House. The press is the only comprehensive publishing house in the Tibet Autonomous Region.

== Important published books ==
- Peaceful Liberation of Tibet (和平解放西藏), 1995.
- Unforgettable Tibet (难忘西藏), 2001.
- A General History of Tibetan People: A Vase of Treasures (藏族通史·吉祥宝瓶), 2001.
