= Political purges during and after the 1989 Tiananmen Square protests and massacre =

The 1989 Tiananmen Square protests and massacre were a turning point for many Chinese Communist Party (CCP) officials, who were subjected to a purge that started after June 4, 1989. The purge covered top-level government figures down to local officials, and included CCP General Secretary Zhao Ziyang and his associates. The purge took the form of a massive ideological campaign that lasted 18 months. At least 4 million Communist Party members (a tenth of the total) were under some sort of investigation. The government stated that the purge was undertaken for the purpose of “resolutely getting rid of hostile elements, antiparty elements, and corrupt elements" as well as "dealing strictly with those inside the party serious tendencies toward bourgeois liberalization” and purify the party.

Party members who joined the demonstration before the declaration of martial law had to write thousand-word accounts to prove their loyalty, but ultimately their loyalty would be determined by the party. Only the members whose loyalty had been proved could re-register their party memberships. Those who expressed the desire to resign to protest the crackdown were not allowed resignation, instead, the party would expel them.

== Nationwide Purge ==
The initial stage of the purge only targeted approximately 250 liberal-minded leading cadres who played an active role in supporting the student protest. However, when the party hardliners tried to expand the purge within the party, they found it difficult to isolate a “small handful” of officials. Although an investigation was launched against all ranks of officials across the country after the event, the result did not match the CCP's expectation.

Over 800,000 CCP members and cadres had supported the student movement, but according to the Fourteenth Party Congress in October 1992, only 1,179 party cadres were punished and a total of 13,254 party cadres were required to undergo party discipline. The major reasons for the failure of the re-registration campaign were: First, local officials tried to protect and cover for each other; second, many party members were angry about the military crackdown and considered the campaign as a tool to test their loyalty; third, many members believed that they had been wronged and that CCP betrayed its principles.

Nevertheless, though the campaign did not match the CCP's goal, many members had been purged. In the name of an anticorruption campaign that started in spring 1990, 79,000 party members were expelled in 1990, and by October 1992 the cumulative total had increased to 154,289. Although it is not clear how many party members were expelled solely because of the political purge because the party never publicly revealed the number, it is hard to deny the purge's connection with the protest.

== Purge of Top Officials ==
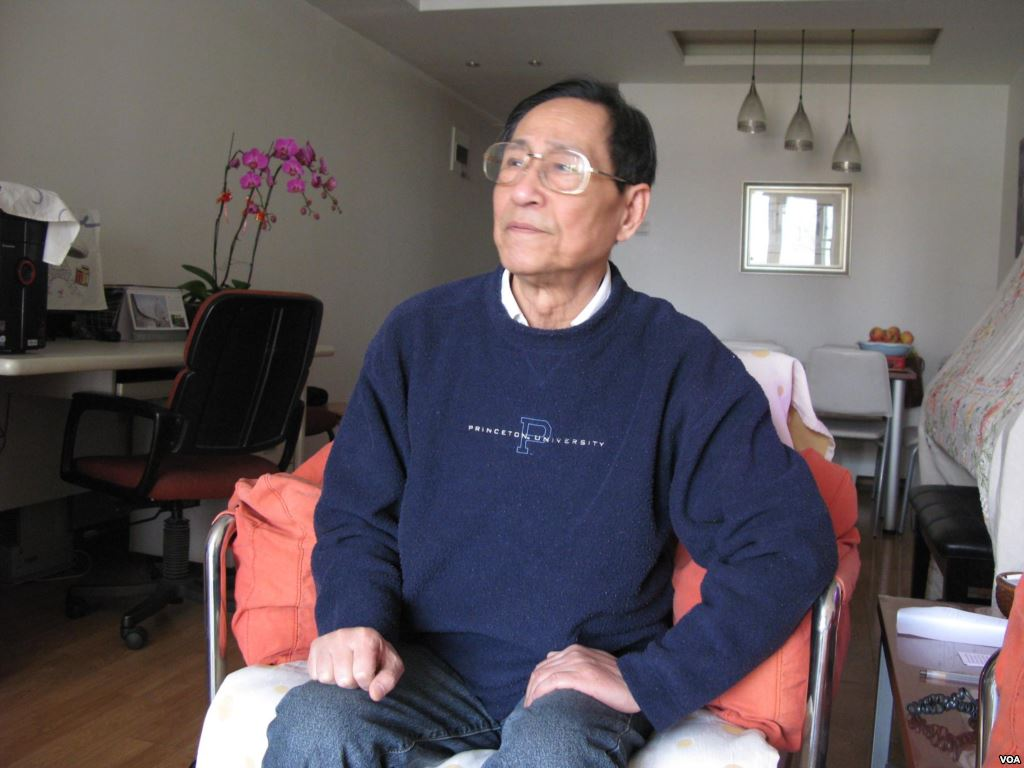
Bao Tong in 2014. Bao was a high level party official punished for his reformist views.

Zhao Ziyang was the General Secretary of the Chinese Communist Party in 1989, who was the most powerful political figure during that time. He was one of the first party officials who lost political power during the purge. Zhao and CCP Politburo Standing Committee member Hu Qili voted against enacting the martial law in response to the protests during the CCP Politburo meeting on May 17, 1989. Chinese Premier Li Peng and Vice Premier Yao Yilin voted the opposite, and other Politburo Standing Committee member Qiao Shi remained neutral. There was no clear majority in the vote until Military Chairman Deng Xiaoping and Vice Chairman Yang Shangkun were suddenly added; they both sided with Li Peng.

After this meeting, Zhao Ziyang refused to participate in implementing martial law in any aspect. He was called a counterrevolutionary during an informal meeting in Deng Xiaoping's house on May 20 because of his support for the protesting students and his anti-party decision attitude. In the same meeting, Deng announced the removal of Zhao from the position of General Secretary.

Zhao tried to protest the legitimacy of Deng's decision by claiming “it cannot be considered legal to have made such a decision when two members of the PSC had not even been notified”. Zhao could not accept the decision from Deng, however, it did not change the result. On June 24, Zhao was officially condemned for supporting the turmoil (动乱) and splitting (分裂) the party. From the party's perspective, Zhao was deemed responsible for his alleged contribution to the turmoil, and he, as a result, lost all his posts. Moreover, Zhao lost his freedom of mobility ever since. Zhao became the first victim of the political struggle or purge.

Hu Qili was a member of the CCP Politburo Standing Committee, and he voted against issuing martial law with Zhao Ziyang on May 17. Besides his vote on May 17, Hu also publicly declared the necessity for reform. From May 11 to May 13, Hu invited leaders from the press in Beijing and shared his opinion on the student movement. He emphasized before the press the need to have democratic reforms based on the law. More importantly, he claimed the press had the duty to increase CCP and government transparency. However, on June 24, Hu Qili's positions in both the Politburo Standing Committee (政治局常委) and the Secretariat (书记处书记) were removed.

Bao Tong was another casualty of the purge. He was a secretary to the Politburo and Zhao's right-hand man. Bao was at the centre of the political reforms in the late 1980s and during the student movement in 1989. He was also a critical figure in the Zhao's government. When Zhao decided to support the student movement and refused to consider the student movement as an unrest, Bao drafted his speeches in meetings. When Zhao lost in the political struggle on May 17, Bao Tong was quickly arrested. Although before his arrest, Bao tried to use citizen's right and party members’ right and duty to protect himself, he quickly realised that “these things [were] probably not enough to protect [him]”.

On May 28, 1989, Bao was imprisoned in Qincheng Prison, which holds the country's most important political criminals, without due process. Bao received his sentence on July 21, 1992. Bao was sentenced to seven years of imprisonment and deprived of political rights for two years. He was charged with leaking government classified information by warning the demonstrators at Tiananmen Square that martial law was about to be imposed. He was also convicted for promoting anti-revolutionary propaganda. As Zhao's associate, Bao was also removed from his political positions.

Yan Mingfu and Rui Xingwen were both secretaries to the Politburo during the student movement. Yan and Rui attended the meeting with the press in Beijing on May 13. Hu Qili was the leading cadre in the meeting, Yan and Rui also expressed positive opinions about the student movement and the necessity of government reform. On May 15, Yan Mingfu affirmed students’ patriotism and their enthusiasm on promoting democracy when he had a conversion with more than 50 student leaders. He and Li Tieying both publicly claimed the student movement was mostly positive. They also stated that the party and government needed to reform in terms of decision-making, democratization, anti-corruption and more social problems. For these activities, the CCP Thirteen through its Central Committee Meeting, removed Yan Mingfu and Rui Xingwen from their posts effective June 24.
