= Dialogue between students and the government during the 1989 Tiananmen Square protests =

During the Tiananmen Square protests of 1989 in Beijing, China, students demanded a dialogue between Chinese government officials and student representatives. In total, three sessions of dialogue took place between the students and government representatives.

The demand for dialogue began on April 22 during Hu Yaobang's official memorial. Three students knelt on the steps to the Great Hall holding a large paper containing seven demands and waited for a party official to accept their petition. No party official, however, came out to receive their list of demands. The main purpose of dialogue was to resolve growing problems such as corruption and rising living costs within China. In order to prepare for potential dialogue, the Dialogue Delegation was created. It was organized by Shen Tong of Peking University and Xiang Xiaoji of University of Political Science and Law and included elected representatives from various universities. Students requested that any student-government dialogue be broadcast live on television. The government, however, repeatedly failed to meet this request and proposed instead to have it recorded and aired at a different time. Three major student-government dialogues occurred throughout the student movement on April 29, May 14, and May 18. The April 29 and May 18 dialogues were broadcast on television at a later time after the original dialogues concluded. All of the dialogues, however, failed to produce a satisfactory result for both the students and the government.

== April 29: the preliminary dialogue ==
The dialogue on April 29, 1989, was the first dialogue between student and government representatives to be recorded and broadcast. It was attended by government representatives Yuan Mu (spokesman for State Council), He Dongchang, Yuan Liben, Lu Yucheng and student representatives from 16 different Beijing institutions. Issues that were brought up by students included official profiteering and freedom of speech within the media. At the beginning of the dialogue, student representatives stated that this dialogue should be regarded as a preliminary dialogue and not the equal dialogue demanded by students. Equal dialogue by the definition of students was one where student representatives are elected by majority of students and where they are not treated as subordinates. From the students' perspectives, this dialogue did not reach any firm conclusions as Yuan and other officials were evasive in responding to the students' questions. The focus of the dialogue always went back to the need for stability in China. From Li Peng and other leaders' perspective, Yuan performed very well during the dialogue. The government felt that the dialogue achieved its purpose while the students were unsatisfied with the dialogue.

== May 14: The Dialogue Delegation ==
Plans for the May 14th dialogue began on May 9, 1989, when Shen Tong was approached by a government official on campus claiming to be able to arrange an unofficial dialogue for the Dialogue Delegation with Yan Mingfu, the head of the Communist Party's United Front Work Department. The Dialogue Delegation raised three points for discussion which included the current student movement, the advancement of substantive reforms, and the clause within the Constitution of China that guarantees freedom of speech and assembly. The dialogue was attended by Yan Mingfu, the Politburo member in charge of education Li Tieying, and ten other minor officials of various capacities. Thirteen students from the Dialogue Delegation were selected to lead the dialogue.

Due to the short notice for dialogue, government officials claimed that the dialogue could not be broadcast live, which was an original demand from the students. The May 14 dialogue would instead be recorded by China Central Television and aired with a tape delay. The Dialogue Delegation continued to push for the live broadcast of the dialogue and demanded that the dialogue be at least broadcast live to students in Tiananmen Square. In addition to the Dialogue Delegation, other student observers were also present at this dialogue. Disorder occurred in the dialogue proceedings as students observers tried to get their questions directed at the government, detracting the dialogue from the Dialogue Delegation's original three points. The dialogue came to a sudden halt when a group of students from Tiananmen Square came and demanded for the dialogue to end, upon finding out that the dialogue was not broadcast live as promised.

== May 18: meeting with Li Peng ==
The May 18 dialogue was the most significant broadcast dialogue to occur between student representatives and the government because it involved Premier Li Peng and 11 student representatives. Other senior government officials included the chair of the State Education Commission Li Tieying, the Head of the United Front Work Department Yan Mingfu, Beijing party chief Li Ximing and mayor Chen Xitong. Student leaders in attendance included Wu'erkaixi, Wang Dan, and Xiong Yan.

Li Peng came into the dialogue with the agenda of ending the students' hunger strike and did not regard it as a negotiation between two sides. Wu'erkaixi showed up to the dialogue wearing a hospital gown and holding an oxygen tank, ostensibly due to having been on hunger strike, a rather theatric showing for television audiences around the country. Wu'erkaixi opened the dialogue by launching a tirade against Li Peng for arriving late, saying "you just said that this meeting is a little late [...] we asked to meet with you as early as April 22. This meeting is not only a little late, but too late!"

A large number of student leaders spoke in quick succession. Most pointed to the nature of the movement as "patriotic" and "democratic", and asked for the government to affirm it as such. Wang Xuezhen, head of the party branch at Peking University, affirmed statements by the students, stating unequivocally, "I believe that our students are patriotic. They hope to advance democracy in our country. [They] are not trying to create turmoil. I hope our government will affirm this point."

Li Tieying was the first to speak on behalf of the government. Li mostly laboured through bureaucratic jargon, but hinted that the government was open to create more channels for dialogue with student representatives. He stressed stability and said that the effects of the movement's expansion could not be predicted. He told students that institutions exist to channel grievances, such as the National People's Congress. Yan Mingfu affirmed the intentions of the students but warned that since student leaders no longer had control over the direction of the movement, 'bad eggs' within the movement were stirring up trouble and preventing meaningful dialogue from taking place.

Li Peng said that the government had a duty to "maintain order", and said that the majority of students are "patriotic" and "not causing turmoil". Li said that the government's foremost concern was that of students' health, but that the government opposed continued disruption of social order. Student representatives brought up the issue of the April 26 Editorial and demanded acknowledgement of the student movement as patriotic. Li Peng reaffirmed the April 26 editorial by stating that despite the students' good intentions, there were people who are taking advantage of the situation and creating disturbances.

Beijing mayor Chen Xitong talked about adverse effect the protests had on economic activity in the city, saying that traffic in Beijing was paralyzed and industrial production was severely disrupted.

Student representatives expected to hold a substantive dialogue where the government and students were considered equals. They wanted to have an open discussion of issues with the government and come up with resolutions. The course of the dialogue made it clear, however, that Li Peng's main objective was convincing the students to end the hunger strike. The meeting ended as students saw that they held a subordinate position. It was evident to them that the government would not compromise or meet any of their demands.

== Results ==
None of the student-government dialogues held produced any significant results for the student movement. The April 29 dialogue produced negative reactions from students who were unsatisfied with the chosen representatives, considered too junior. Additionally, student representatives were chosen by the government and considered unrepresentative of the wider student movement. On an international scale, more positive feedback was provided regarding this dialogue. Sheryl WuDunn of The New York Times wrote "what was remarkable was not just that the meeting took place but that the Government televised nearly all of it, apparently as a concession to a student's demand". From an outside perspective, progress occurred in the student movement as the government compromised to the students' demands by holding a broadcast dialogue. The May 14 and 18 dialogues were also seen as unproductive by students as Li Peng addressed the students in the movement as "children". Student-government dialogues were not a two-way street as students were allowed to express their opinions but the government was not inclined to answer their questions. In the end, an equal standing dialogue was unachievable for the students.
