= Hubei People's Press =

Publishing organization in China

- Status: Active
- Founded: September 1, 1954
- Headquarters location: Wuhan
- Official website: hbpp.com.cn

Hubei People's Press (Chinese: 湖北人民出版社), also known as Hubei People's Publishing House, abbreviated as PPH, is a publishing organization in the People's Republic of China. Inaugurated on September 1, 1954, its office is located in Wuhan.

The predecessor of Hubei People's Press was the Zhongnan People's Publishing House (中南人民出版社) and Zhongnan People's Literature and Art Publishing House (中南人民文学艺术出版社) founded in the early days of the founding of the PRC. It is now a comprehensive publishing house for social sciences in the province.

== Important published books ==
- Exposure of the Crimes of Hu Feng's counter-revolutionary Group (对胡风反革命集团罪行的揭露), 1955.
- Reveal the True Face of "Ever-victorious General" Lin Biao (剥掉林彪"常胜将军"的画皮), 1974.
- Xu Chongde and He Huahui. The Constitution and Democratic System (宪法与民主制度), 1982.
- A biography of Lin Biao (林彪的这一生), 1994.
- Complete Works of Hu Feng (胡风全集), 1999.
- Fabrication of the "Hu Feng Clique" (胡风集团冤案始末), 2003.
- he Three Lin Brothers: Lin Yuying, Lin Yunan, Lin Biao (林氏三兄弟：林育英林育南), 2004.
