= Ma Junwu =

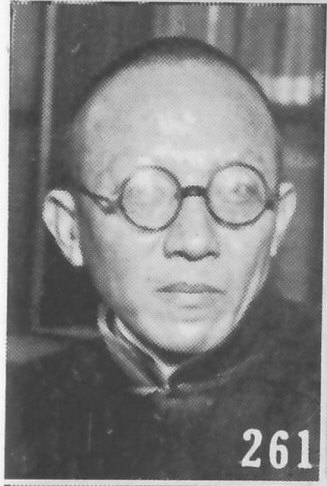
Ma Junwu as pictured in The Most Recent Biographies of Chinese Dignitaries

Ma Junwu (Chinese: 馬君武; 1881 in Guilin – 1940 in Guilin) was a scientist and educator in China and first president of Guangxi University.

== Biography ==
Ma Junwu was born in Guilin in 1881 and enlisted in one of the new schools for higher education there. Later he went to Shanghai to study French at the Aurora University.

With a friend Ma Junwu founded a publishing and translation society.

The years 1902 to 1903 Ma Junwu spent in Japan, where he met Sun Yatsen and later became a member of Sun's party.

From 1907 onward, Ma Junwu studied in Berlin, where in 1911 he received his engineering degree in metallurgy.

After holding various political offices in the Chinese Republic, Ma Junwu returned to Berlin in 1914 to study agricultural chemistry and returned to China with his doctorate degree in 1916. There he resumed leadership positions in various ministries of the government, besides taking up teaching.

Ma Junwu translated Charles Darwin's On the Origin of Species into Chinese. He began this in 1901 and it was not finished until 1919. It was published in 1920.

== Translations ==
- On Liberty, by John Stuart Mill
- The Rights of Women, by Olympe de Gouges
- The Isles of Greece, by Lord Byron
- Grundriss der politischen Ökonomie
- Die Welträtsel by Ernst Haeckel
- Origin of Species and The Descent of Man, both by Charles Darwin

== Literature ==
- Selected Works of Ma Junwu馬君武文選, Guangxi Normal University Press, Guilin 2000
