= Anarchism in Malaysia =

Anarchism in Malaysia arose from the revolutionary activities of Chinese immigrants in British Malaya, who were the first to construct an organized anarchist movement in the country, reaching its peak during the 1920s. After a campaign of repression by the British authorities, anarchism was supplanted by Bolshevism as the leading revolutionary current, until the resurgence of the anarchist movement during the 1980s, as part of the Malaysian punk scene.

== History ==
The Malay Peninsula was largely stateless until the 2nd century, when early Malayan states such as the kingdom of Langkasuka began to form and come to dominate the region. These eventually evolved from city-states and small kingdoms into much larger polities, capable of controlling the whole peninsular and beyond. In the 7th century, the empire of Srivijaya came to dominate the Malay Peninsula, as well as the islands Sumatra and Java, absorbing many of the Malay states that once existed there. In 1288, Srivijaya was conquered by the Javanese kingdom of Singhasari, which by 1293 had evolved into the empire of Majapahit, coming to control the majority of the Malay Archipelago.

Up until this point, the states that ruled over the Malayan Peninsular were either Hindu or Buddhist, but with Srivijaya's collapse came the rise of Muslim sultanates throughout the peninsular. Eventually, the central sultanates of Selangor, Perak, Pahang, and Negri Sembilan came together to establish the Federated Malay States. Whereas the northern sultanates of Kedah, Kelantan, Perlis, and Terengganu, and the southern sultanate of Johor, remained unfederated.

In spite of the rise of Malayan states over the centuries, many indigenous peoples of the peninsular maintained themselves as stateless societies. One of these groups is the Semai people, an acephalous society who live in small horticultural settlements in the center of the peninsular. The Semai have no concept of private property, organize their communities through public assemblies and are well known for their non-violent way of life.

=== Anarchism in British Malaya ===
When the British Empire first colonized the Malay Peninsula in the early 19th century, they established the four Straits Settlements of Penang, Singapore, Malacca and Dinding, which came under the control of the East India Company. Chinese workers began to immigrate to these settlements, particularly to work in the mining and lumber industries. Many of these immigrants permanently settled in Malaya, outside the authority of the Qing dynasty, where they able to freely spread the revolutionary ideas of republicanism, nationalism, socialism and anarchism.

==== The emergence of anarchism and the labour movement in Malaya ====
During the 1900s, Sun Yat-sen often visited the peninsula, where he organized branches of the Tongmenghui in Seremban, Kuala Lumpur, Penang and Malacca, with Penang acting as the organization's headquarters. Following the 1911 Revolution, the Tongmenghui reorganized itself into the Kuomintang. When it was banned by the British authorities, it continued its operations clandestinely: raising funds to aid the revolutionary effort in the newly established Republic of China, as well as organizing Chinese language schools and libraries in Malaya.

When the Second Revolution against the government of Yuan Shikai was defeated, Southeast Asia became the new center of activity for the Chinese labour movement, with branches of a new Workers' Union being established throughout Malaya. Chinese anarchists were leading figures in the Workers' Union, organizing from Penang a support base all over Southeast Asia. Liu Shifu launched a number of anarchist organizations in Malaya, including the "Society of Truth" and the "Society of Anarcho-Communist Comrades". Penang quickly became a hub for the publication and distribution of anarchist propaganda in Malaya.

After the dissolution of the short-lived Empire of China and the death of Emperor Yuan Shikai, a Third Revolution was launched by Sun Yat-Sen in South China, in an attempt to resist further rule by the central government. The Workers' Union moved its base of operations to the revolutionary capital of Guangzhou, where it organized the city's workers into industrial unions. Inspired by the organization of the Industrial Workers of the World, the Workers' Union established the "Industrial Federation of Overseas Chinese", in order to unite the Chinese labor movement across borders. This transformed the Malayan Workers' Union into the center of trade unionism in the country, spearheaded by the local anarchist movement.

According to the British authorities, membership of the Malayan Workers' Union had risen to 200,000 people by the close of the 1910s. British intelligence claimed that the Union was controlled by Chinese anarchist secret societies, and that investigations had revealed close links between the organizations in Malaya and China. The British banned the Malayan Workers' Union in 1919, so it merged its organizations with the Kuomintang and continued its trade union organizing underground.

==== The organized anarchist movement in Malaya ====
In 1919, a Chinese anarchist group from Guangzhou established the "Society of Truth" in Malaya. The group actively distributed anarchist literature throughout Southeast Asia, even producing some of its material in the Malay language. In March 1919, an anarchist circle in Kuala Lumpur began publishing the newspaper Yi Qunbao, printing a variety of materials on anarchism, anarcho-communism and Marxism.

The Malayan anarchist movement saw a significant upsurge as part of the May Fourth Movement, which had risen up in reaction to the cession of Shandong to the Empire of Japan in the Treaty of Versailles. According to one anarchist activist in Malaya, it was the impetus for a growth of class consciousness in the country. Workers and students participated in protests throughout Malaya, organized by the anarchist Society of Truth, escalating into protests, riots and boycotts. Yi Qunbao was at the forefront of spreading propaganda during the May Fourth Movement, characterizing the boycotts as "self-defense", the fight to overthrow the Beiyang government as "self-determination" and the goal of establishing anarcho-communism in China as "self-government". This propaganda was spearheaded by the anarchist Goh Tun-ban, who urged workers to establish a stateless and classless society through the means of a social revolution. For his part in openly publishing anarchist literature in Kuala Lumpur, Goh was interrogated by the British authorities, which arrested and deported him, along with other Chinese anarchist public figures.

Despite the repression and deportation of leading anarchist individuals, the organized anarchist movement continued to grow. In 1919, the Malayan Anarchist Federation was established and affiliated to the Society of Anarcho-Communist Comrades. The organization stated in its program:

"Liberty, Equality, Fraternity, Community of Goods, Co-operation; each does what he can and takes what he needs: no government, laws or military forces, no landlords, capitalists or leisured class. No money, religion, police, prison or leaders, No representatives, heads of families, no person uneducated or not working: no rules of marriages, no degrees of high or low, rich or poor, and the method to be adopted is given by organization of comrades by means of communication centres, by propaganda in pamphlets, speeches and education, by passive resistance to those in power. Do not pay taxes, cease work, cease trade; by the method of direct action, assassinate and spread disorder. Anarchy is the great revolution"

==== The peak of the anarchist movement ====
By 1920, anarchist groups were operating in Penang, Ipoh, Kuala Lumpur and Seremban. Liu Kafei, the brother of Liu Shifu, was among the most prominent anarchists in Malaya at the time, alongside a number of school teachers. Chinese schools played a particularly important role in the propagation of revolutionary propaganda, leading the colonial administration to introduce a law compelling schools to register with the authorities. The British also noted that ties between the Kuomintang and the Malayan anarchist movement were strengthening, in part due to the actions of the "Shiyan Tun" group.

The Yi Qunbao continued to operate out of Kuala Lumpur, with Liu Kafei acting as editor-in-chief. He penned a column that analyzed the social events of the time, discussing the topics of free speech, education and the Russian Revolution, among others. Kafei openly advocated for an anarcho-communist society based on absolute freedom and equality.

In 1921, Malayan anarchists celebrated the country's first May Day, which continued with each passing year. New libertarian publications started to be distributed throughout the country, publishing translations of the works of Peter Kropotkin. In 1923, a branch of the Malayan Anarchist Federation was established in Penang, which organized a high school to provide the island's population with education. The British authorities monitored the situation in Penang, banning leading anarchists from teaching.

Anarchist activity rose to particular prominence in 1924, with a number of anarchists becoming public figures in Kuala Lumpur, Ampang, Ipoh, Penang and Seremban. Although the organization of the Anarchist Federation remained small, with about 50 active members, anarchism was widely influential among Chinese Malayans - particularly school teachers and print workers. A national congress of the Anarchist Federation was held in February 1924, during which they discussed the issues of organization, establishing schools and increasing anarchist agitation. Anarchist teachers subsequently began to actively agitate among their students and colleagues at the schools, while the number of street demonstrations increased. Many of these decisions brought the Malayan anarchists into conflict with the Chinese Anarchist Federation in Guangzhou, which did not approve of the new-found independence of the Malayan federation. Some of the participants of the congress were also arrested by the authorities, forcing some prominent members to flee into exile. Nevertheless, anarchist literature continued to be distributed among the workers and students of Malaya.

In January 1925, anarchists began to plan a series of assassinations in response to the colonial repression of the movement. In Penang, an attempted assassination of the governor Laurence Guillemard failed, which shifted the target towards other colonial authorities. The young anarchist Wong Sau Ying detonated an explosive device inside the Chinese protectorate at Kuala Lumpur, injuring two colonial officials. Wong was swiftly arrested and sentenced to 10 years in Pudu Prison, where she hung herself. After this attempt, the British colonial authorities intensified their repression against the country's left-wing movement, ordering the suppression of the Kuomintang and the Anarchist Federation. Many anarchist activists were arrested and deported. This blow proved too hard for the anarchist movement to recover from, and it went into remission, although some strands of syndicalism continued to hold influence.

=== Communism, nationalism and the Malaysian independence struggle ===
In the place of the anarchist movement, Leninism became the dominant trend among the Malayan far-left. The Chinese Communist Party began to agitate among Chinese immigrants in British Malaya, which culminated in the establishment of the Malayan Communist Party in April 1930. Although the party was subject to repression, it managed to organize trade unions and workers' committees among Chinese workers, launching a number of strikes. While the Communist Party was influential mostly amongst Chinese Malaysian workers, the left wing of the early Malay nationalist movement held an influence among Malays, resulting in the formation of the Kesatuan Melayu Muda in 1938.

During the Japanese occupation of Malaya, the KMM actively aided the Empire of Japan, but their requests for independence were denied and the party was forcibly dissolved by the occupation forces. For its part, the MCP established the Malayan Peoples' Anti-Japanese Army to combat the occupation, igniting a guerilla war throughout Malaya.

With the return of British rule at the end of World War II, the Malayan Union was established to bring about unitary control over the whole peninsula. This policy was wholly rejected by native Malayans, including the Parti Kebangsaan Melayu Malaya, who subsequently established the Federation of Malaya in a return to federalism. However, the continuation of British rule was untenable to the MCP, which established the Malayan National Liberation Army to carry out attacks against British colonists. After the MNLA assassination of three British farmers, the colonial administration invoked a state of emergency in Malaya, igniting a civil war between the Federation and the Communists. The administration launched a crackdown on all left-wing political groups, declaring the PKMM and MCP to be illegal. The right-wing United Malays National Organisation subsequently became the ruling political party in the country, cooperating with the British to defeat the communist insurgency. Meanwhile, the PKMM was reorganized as the Parti Rakyat Malaysia, which rejected UMNO rule and cooperated with the Labour Party of Malaya to revitalize the Malayan left-wing.

As the communist insurgency drew to an end, the proclamation of Malaysia united the federation of Malaya with Sarawak and Sabah to form the independent country of Malaysia. The conditions brought by a further communist insurgency against the newly independent Malaysian state led to the MCP suppressing dissent within its own ranks, causing the split of numerous factions, which began to fight amongst themselves. This culminated in the final dissolution of the Malaysian Communist Party in 1989, as the country's radical left-wing began to look for alternatives to Marxism-Leninism.

=== Re-emergence of the anarchist movement ===
After a long period of remission, anarchism was revived in Malaysia during the 1980s, as evidenced by Malaysian anarchists taking part in an international anarchist congress at Venice in September 1984. An anarchist new wave took hold in the 1990s, as part of the nascent punk subculture growing throughout Southeast Asia. The Malaysian punk music scene grew rapidly in Kuala Lumpur, Ipoh and Johor Bahru, with bands like Carburetor Dung openly referencing anarchism in their work. Anarchist groups such as the Anarcho-punks Federation, Anti-Racist Action and Liberated Aboriginal were established. These groups organized practical projects involving the distribution of clothes, fundraising for local residents and arranging a free laundry service, among other things. Anarchist fanzines were also published and distributed throughout Malaysia. There was also a chapter of Food Not Bombs established in Kuala Lumpur and an Anarchist Black Cross network was organized for providing aid to political prisoners.

In the 2000s, the Malaysian anarchist movement began to become more diverse, with anarcho-pacifism, anarcho-communism and green anarchism spreading throughout the country. But the growth of the movement was hampered by the lack of literature in the Malaysian language and a high cost of books, which were often unaffordable for poor Malaysians. The Malaysian government's repressive policies were also a barrier, as public meetings couldn't be held without police permission, the publication of subversive literature was banned and electronic communications were closely monitored. The Internal Security Act also allowed for preventive detention without trial or criminal charges.

In 2005, the Gudang Noisy self-managed social center was established in Ampang. This project evolved into the Universal Library infoshop in 2010, after learning about various autonomous centers in Japan, Germany and Singapore, and the center itself was renamed Rumah Api. The center held concerts, film screenings and discussions, as well as operating a kitchen for Food Not Bombs. The library built up a collection of books and pamphlets, eventually beginning the publication of the Malay language Bidas magazine. Activists working at the Rumah Api began agitating among the student movement, attracting participation in the city's May Day demonstrations and distributing anarchist leaflets. Other social centers and infoshops were also established in Trengganu and Bangsar, among other places.

The acceleration of May Day demonstrations throughout the country brought with it a renewed interest in the labour movement and anarcho-syndicalism. Though initially met with criticism, anarcho-syndicalists managed to establish illegal trade unions in factories throughout Malaysia, with the goal of creating "one big union" through the federation of Malaysian workers' unions. Attention was particularly dedicated to agitation and education, with the establishment of Cukong Press bringing the publication of anarchist literature into the Malay language. They eventually published the Black Book, which became the first anarchist book to be originally written in the Malay language.

May Day demonstrations subsequently grew larger and became more militant. In 2014, an anarchist bloc at the May Day anti-GST rally in Kuala Lumpur attempted to break onto Merdeka Square, which had been cordoned off by police, where they confronted members of the far-right Malaysian Islamic Party. At the May Day anti-GST rally in 2015, an anarchist bloc marched in protest against a rise in living costs, the cutting of social welfare and the raising of taxes. When the demonstration refused to disperse, anarchists openly confronted the police, which were attempting to seize food and water from the demonstrators. After anarchists began to throw smoke bombs and firecrackers, attacked a McDonald's branch with paint and threw rocks at a bank building, the police used tear gas and a water cannon to disperse the demonstrators, detaining about 30 people in the process.

This resurgence in anarchist activity brought with it a new wave of repression. On August 28, 2015, a detachment of armed police stormed the Rumpah Api during a concert, confiscating musical equipment, computers and books, and detained 163 people, including foreign nationals. On January 24, 2016, at a rally in Kuala Lumpur against the ratification of the Trans-Pacific Partnership, seven anarchists were arrested by police, under accusations of property damage.

In 2020, as a criticism of the government's handling of the COVID-19 pandemic in Malaysia, anarchists throughout the country coordinated a series of banner drops, calling for the resignation of leading Malaysian politicians.

== See also ==
- List of anarchist movements by region
- Anarchism in China
- Anarchism in Indonesia
- Anarchism in Singapore
- Communism in Malaysia
