= Anarchism in Indonesia =

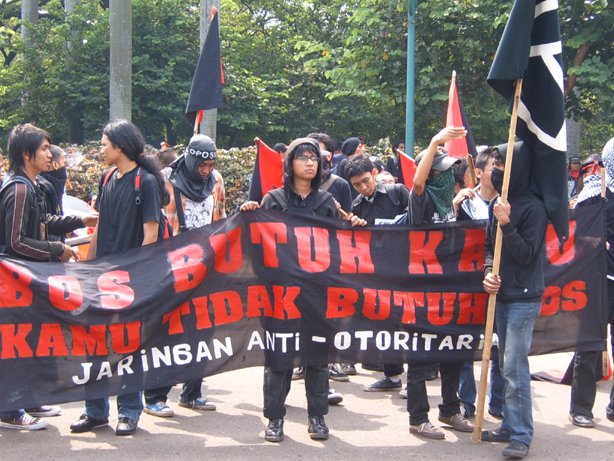
Anarchist Movement in Jakarta

Anarchism in Indonesia has its roots in the anti-colonial struggle against the Dutch Empire. It became an organized movement at the behest of Chinese anarchist immigrants, who played a key part in the development of the workers' movement in the country. The anarchist movement was suppressed, first by the Japanese occupation of the Dutch East Indies, then by the successive regimes of Sukarno and Suharto, before finally re-emerging in the 1990s.

== History ==
=== Dutch East Indies ===
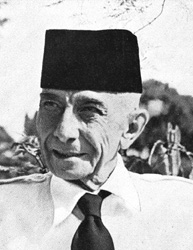
Ernest Douwes Dekker, an early leader of the Indonesian anti-colonialist movement and one of the country's first anarchists.

The first evidence of anarchism in the Dutch East Indies was present in the anti-colonial writings of Eduard Douwes Dekker, who denounced the Dutch colonial administration over Indonesia, raising public awareness of the brutality inflicted against the Indonesian people. His works, including the well-known satirical novel Max Havelaar, were particularly influential among early Dutch anarchist circles. His grandnephew Ernest Douwes Dekker became a leading figure in the Indonesian anti-colonialist movement during the early 20th century. Ernest established contact with other radical anti-colonial activists, including the Indian anarchists Shyamji Krishna Varma and Har Dayal, whose work was published in Dekker's publication Het Tijdschrift. Dekker aligned himself against parliamentarism, due to the suppression of workers' rights that was carried out systematically by European parliaments. He also advocated for both violent and non-violent means of resisting colonialism, which he believed was a moral duty, and was sympathetic to the revolutionary strategy of syndicalism, as opposed to reformism. Dekker was widely considered to be an anarchist himself and was the first native Indonesian to be known as such. He later went on to found the Indische Party, one of the first political organizations established during the Indonesian National Awakening.

==== The organized anarchist movement ====
Dutch Christian anarchists, including Dirk Lodewijk Willem van Mierop, conducted propaganda work in the Dutch East Indies - publishing the periodical Levenskracht, which advocated for non-violence, natural living and vegetarianism. While agitating in the Dutch East Indies, van Mierop even established a local branch of the Union of Religious Anarcho-Communists. Chinese anarchists also conducted propaganda work there, with Zhang Ji traveling to Java in 1907, where he translated a book on the history of Chinese resistance to Dutch Colonial rule. From 1909, Chinese reading houses began to open around Indonesia, being a means of political education and organization for those resisting both Dutch colonial and Chinese imperial rule. After the 1911 Revolution overthrew the Qing dynasty, Chinese anarchists remaining in Indonesia channeled their efforts into the labour movement, organizing the country's first workers' organizations in Makassar, Batavia, Surabaya and Kupang. Anarchist cells began to arise between 1914 and 1916, distributing Liu Shifu's newspaper Minsheng among the populace.

Indonesian trade unions also began to emerge around that time, many of them influenced by Marxism. They were particularly active in organizing within the ranks of the Royal Netherlands East Indies Army, establishing a soldiers' and sailors' union that coordinated resistance during World War I. On 7 May 1916, anarchist sailors in Surabaya organized a wildcat strike (without the union's approval) against their poor living and working conditions, coming into direct conflict with the military police. In the subsequent repression, 5 people were injured, 47 sailors were dismissed and one of the principle organizers was imprisoned for 8 months. The union leadership criticized the local branch for its lack of opposition to the strike, while the SDAP leadership declared it necessary to combat the "anarchist elements" within the union, and the army's high command called for unions to be separated from the armed forces entirely.

After the war ended in 1918, anarchist groups began to grow larger, publishing newspapers with a broad reach throughout the country. Liu Shixin formed the "Society of Truth" group to distribute anarchist propaganda throughout the archipelago, publishing the Soematra Po, in Medan. but eventually Liu's activity came to the attention of the police, who arrested the group in March 1919, labelling Liu and his comrades "Bushiwei". Liu Shixin was subsequently deported to China, for his role in propagating anarcho-communist propaganda. In April 1919, the Workers' Union was established by anarchists in Surabaya, growing to include branches in other cities. The Union published the anarcho-communist publication Zhenli Bao in Semarang, edited by Bai Binzhou and Wang Yuting. In September 1919, Binzhou and Yuting were both arrested and deported to Hong Kong.

Throughout the 1920s, anarchist organizations organized plantation workers, with attacks against Dutch administrators coming alongside, causing many problems for the Dutch authorities, which carried out extensive searches and property seizures, confiscating any documents they found. Anarchists organized strikes against the Deli Railway Company, reaching their peak in September 1920, when over 15,000 railway workers joined the strike for an increased salary. When some strikers called for reprisals against Dutch officials, the armed forces were brought in to break the strike and cannons were aimed at a local workers' assembly, resulting in the arrest of hundreds of workers. The Dutch authorities exiled Zhang Shimei, one of the main organizers of the strike, to New Guinea, later deporting him to Singapore. Although syndicalist unions continued to operate into the late 1920s, the Chinese anarchist movement in Indonesia was largely suppressed by 1929.

==== The League against Imperialism ====
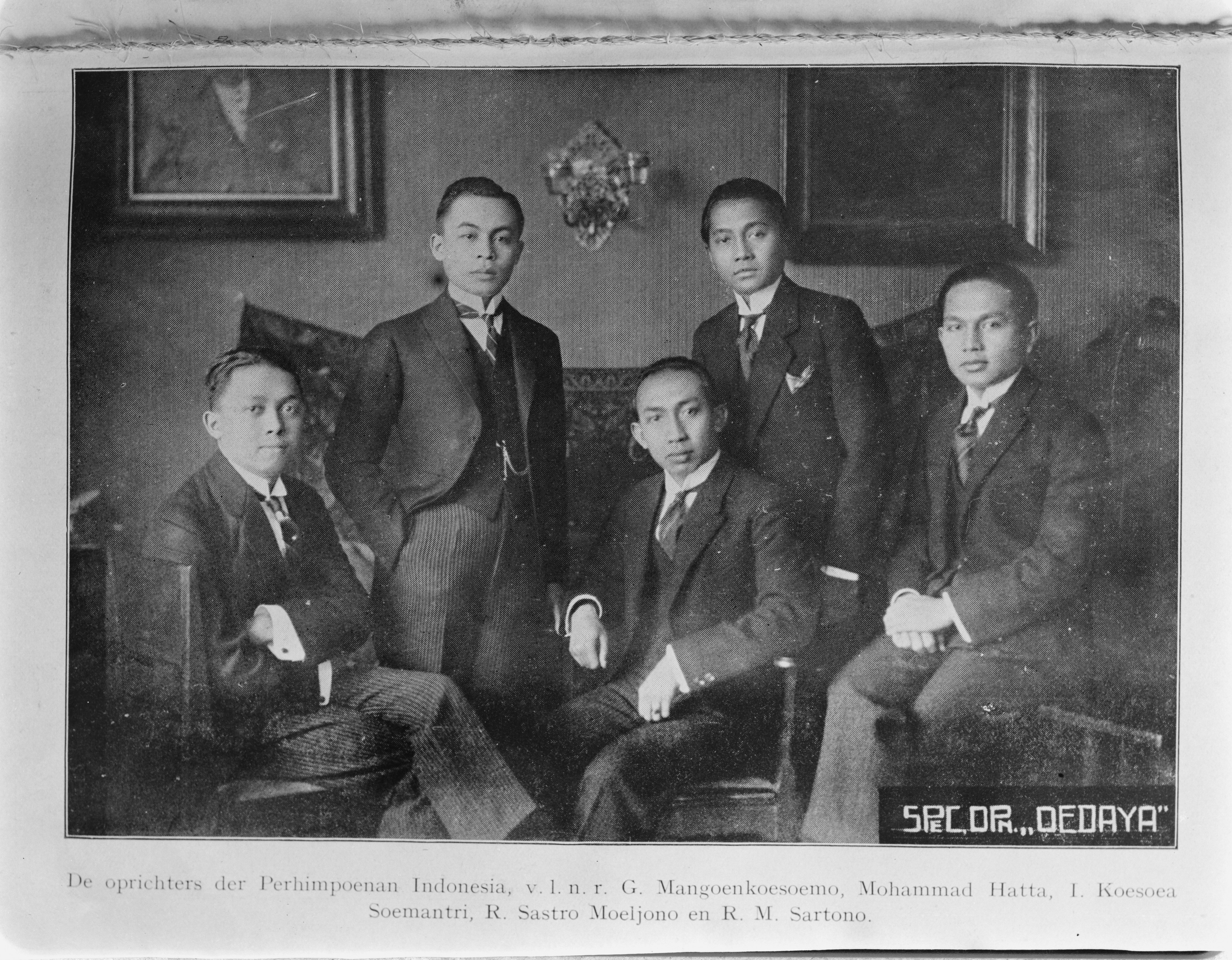
Leaders of Perhimpoenan Indonesia. Left to right: Gunawan Mangunkusumo, Mohammad Hatta, Iwa Kusumasumantri, Sastro Mulyono, and R.M. Sartono

Indonesian students that were studying in the Netherlands, under the banner of Perhimpoenan Indonesia, formed contact with local left-wing groups, including the Dutch anarchist movement. They formed the Indonesian section of the League against Imperialism, where they met with anarchist anti-militarists. A few students took an interest in anarchism, including Sutan Sjahrir, who had moved to the far-left after a short stay at an anarchist commune, although his ideology eventually evolved into democratic socialism - later founding the Socialist Party of Indonesia. However, Indonesians were unable to find common ground with Dutch anarchists, whose anti-nationalism aligned them against the Indonesian desire for independence. At the 1927 Brussels Conference, attended by the Indonesians Mohammad Hatta and Achmad Soebardjo, the anarcho-syndicalist Arthur Lehning warned colonized people against the creation of new states in the anti-imperialist struggle. Similarly, at the 1929 Frankfurt Conference (attended by Hatta), the anarchist Bart de Ligt claimed that the construction of independent nation-states was in the interests of the colonized countries' ruling classes, who merely wished to continue their rule independently of their colonial authorities, advising instead that anti-colonialism should be bound together with anti-nationalism and anti-militarism. The Frankfurt conference was also marred by a bitter division between European communists, who had taken up the party line against "social fascism" after the 6th World Congress of the Communist International, and the national liberationists including Jawaharlal Nehru and Mohammad Hatta, who were actively excluded from the League by the communists. The League eventually collapsed in the 1930s, in part due to its internal divisions.

=== The Indonesian National Revolution ===
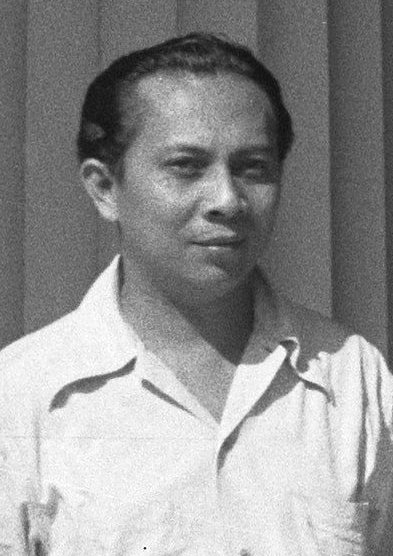
Sutan Sjahrir, the first Prime Minister of Indonesia and a resistance leader during the Japanese occupation. During his studies in the Netherlands, he became influenced by anarchism, though later moved towards democratic socialism.

Two days after the surrender of Japan, Sukarno read out the proclamation of Indonesian Independence, marking the beginning of the Indonesian National Revolution. By this time the Indonesian anarchist movement had largely disappeared, after decades of repression by imperial powers. The newly established Republic of Indonesia, with Sukarno acting as the country's first President and Sutan Sjahrir as its first Prime Minister, set about repressing the nascent anarcho-syndicalist movement. Javanese workers had spontaneously expropriated and established workers' control over the country's railways, plantations and factories. Sukarno and Mohammad Hatta responded by openly attacking the syndicalist character of the new workers' movement, actively repressing them and bringing their enterprises under state control by the spring of 1946.

=== Transition to the New Order ===
During Sukarno's Guided Democracy era, Indonesia was governed under a political system introduced in 1959, when Sukarno ended the unstable parliamentary order and restored the 1945 Constitution, which greatly strengthened the presidency. In practice it meant a much more centralized and authoritarian state, with Sukarno holding a dominant position above all parties and parliament. Sukarno's Guided Democracy would later be toppled by Suharto's New Order. Amidst the milieu of two authoritarian regimes, student movements became rife for the calls of reformation. Notably amongst the student movement was that of Soe Hok Gie, who became famous in the 1960s for his sharp criticism of power. Ben Anderson described Soe Hok Gie as "[...] uncomfortable when associated with authority, instinctively seeing power as the last enemy of morality." Soe Hok Gie once knew historical praxis and writing over pre-independence socialism, especially Di Bawah Lentera Merah, where he examined the radical left within the Sarekat Islam in Semarang for his thesis. Writing that "Sosialisme ala Proudhoun" appeared without criticism and that nihilist tendencies were visible, with admiring accounts of Russian nihilists and "heroisme ala Bakunin." Arguing that Marxist tendencies in Indonesia was attributed to the nihilist movement.

He would become one of the first Indonesians to write publicly about political prisoners, their families, corruption, and abuse of office after the transfer of power from Sukarno to Suharto. He had helped the student campaign against Sukarno, but he also turned his criticism on the New Order's emerging authoritarianism, especially where he saw hypocrisy, repression, and moral collapse, personally witnessing the 1965-1966 mass killings for his reporting. Soe Hok Gie encountered what many Indonesians had during the transition of power; extortion, usury, arbitrary-illegal taxation, land grabbing, corruption, and ineffective bureaucracy. Remarking on his activism he wrote; "I write in part simply to relieve my sense of nausea at our condition. Sometimes, though, I feel as if it’s all useless. I feel that all there is in my articles is a few firecrackers. And I’d like to fill them with bombs."

=== Contemporary Indonesia ===
The anarchist movement re-emerged in the 1990s as part of the Indonesian punk subculture, the largest punk movement in Southeast Asia. Young people had created their own underground sub-culture of punk, which over time developed into a style that was completely different from the original movement. Part of the punk movement began to move towards anti-fascist and anti-authoritarian ideology, in opposition to the New Order dictatorship of Suharto. In 1998, anarchist collectives began to form after the fall of Suharto, organizing discussions, publishing texts in the Indonesian language and forming non-hierarchical groups with which to conduct direct action. Some of the first groups of note were Food Not Bombs collectives, formed to distribute food to those in need.

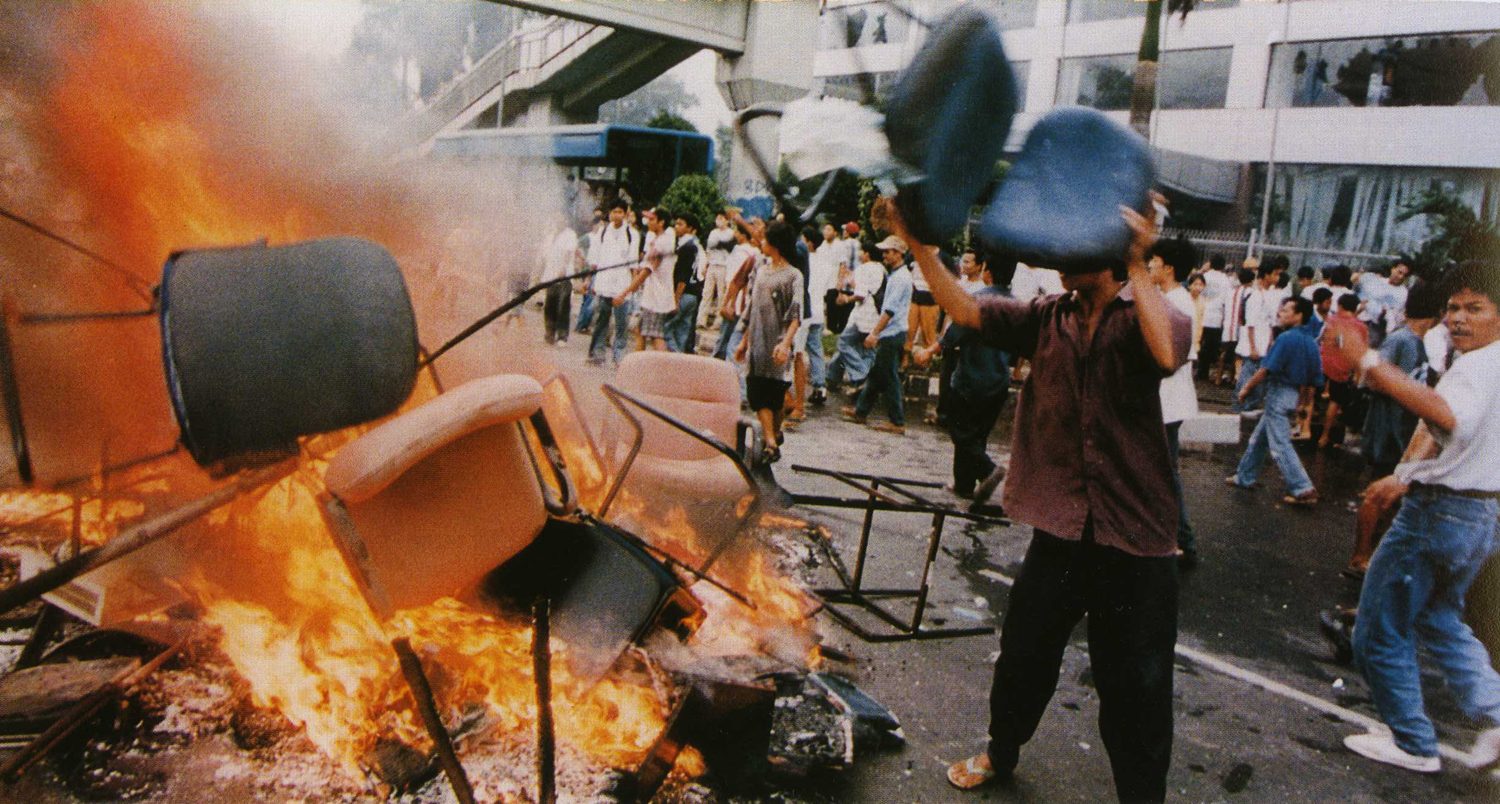
Rioters burning looted goods on the streets of Jakarta, during the May 1998 riots that led to the fall of Suharto.

For most of the early 2000s, the Indonesian anarchist movement remained dispersed and disconnected, with many of its groups being small and short-lived. This began to change with the organization of the 2007 May Day demonstrations, when various groups from around the country unified to form the Anti-authoritarian Network, gathering over 100 people in a May Day action, marking the anarchist movement's first large-scale appearance on the public stage and igniting an acceleration of the movement's growth. The next May Day demonstration in 2008 attracted more than 200 people to protest in Jakarta, directing their action against corporate and political buildings in the city. The procession ended after clashes with police saw the arrest of many of the protest's participants. Although this repression brought a brief halt to the movement's growth, anarchist activists continued their agitation, so that by 2010 there were anarchists groups in Java, Sumatra, Kalimantan, Sulawesi and Bali. In 2011, a series of attacks against corporate buildings and ATMs in Sulawesi, Java and Sumatra were claimed by an Indonesian section of the Informal Anarchist Federation, bringing the tactics of insurrectionary anarchism to the country. The cell condemned peaceful protest, instead inciting direct action, often in the form of property destruction. Inspired by the actions, two anarchists Billy Augustian and Reyhard Rumbayan attacked an ATM in Yogyakarta, but were both quickly arrested after dropping incriminating evidence near the scene. Other insurrectionary anarchists of the "Long Live Luciano Tortuga" Cell in Sulawesi responded to their imprisonment with a series of attacks, including incendiary attacks on power stations and luxury cars. Further attacks from other FAI cells around Indonesia followed.

In 2011, a series of attacks against corporate buildings and ATMs in Sulawesi, Java and Sumatra were claimed by an Indonesian section of the Informal Anarchist Federation, bringing the tactics of insurrectionary anarchism to the country. The cell condemned peaceful protest, instead inciting direct action, often in the form of property destruction. Inspired by the actions, two anarchists Billy Augustian and Reyhard Rumbayan attacked an ATM in Yogyakarta, but were both quickly arrested after dropping incriminating evidence near the scene. Other insurrectionary anarchists of the "Long Live Luciano Tortuga" Cell in Sulawesi responded to their imprisonment with a series of attacks, including incendiary attacks on power stations and luxury cars. Further attacks from other FAI cells around Indonesia followed.

Anarcho-Syndicalists in Bandung singing Buruh Tani and The Internationale in a bloc during May Day in 2019.

The continuation of May Day events into the 2010s brought about a growth of interest in anarcho-syndicalism, leading to the establishment of the Workers' Power Syndicate in Surabaya, which went on to assist factory workers during industrial disputes with their employers. This renewal of interest in trade unionism and syndicalism culminated on 3 October 2012, with the country's first general strike in 50 years. In 2016, the Anarcho-Syndicalist Worker's Fraternity (Indonesian: Persaudaraan Pekerja Anarko Sindikalis, PPAS) was established and affiliated to the IWA-AIT, supported by the Australian Anarcho-Syndicalist Federation. It organizes according to the principles of decentralization, equality, direct action, internationalism, solidarity, mutual cooperation, independence and the rejection of capitalism and the state. It participated in the continuing May Day demonstrations, as well as workers' protests for higher wages, growing to have branches in Jakarta and Surabaya. The PPAS also organized the Independent Union of Taxi Drivers (KUMAN), uniting over 500 drivers around Indonesia and entering into a strike against Uber for higher wages and improved working conditions. In response to the COVID-19 pandemic, the PPAS made demands and organized actions in order to protect workers from the effects of the virus.

In 2020, the government of Indonesia initiated a crackdown on anarchist activity, during which social media accounts were hacked, anarchist activists were arrested, books were seized, detainees were isolated. Police claimed that anarchists were planning a campaign of mass looting and forced a confession from a criminal in which he declared himself "the sole leader of the anarchists." In what many Indonesian anarchists have described as a "witch hunt", on 9 April, three anarchists from Tangerang were arrested for spraying graffiti that read "there's a crisis already, time to burn" and "fight or perish", being charged with public provocation. The detainees were tortured by the police and were put into isolation for a month, before their trial began on 15 June. The Tangerang District Court found the defendants guilty on 28 September, sentencing two to 10 months in prison and the other to 8 months, in what the defense considered to be a dangerous precedent. Anarchists were also reportedly among the active participants in the protests against the passage of the Omnibus Law on Job Creation, during which militants set fire to police stations, vandalized property and clashed with police on barricades in a number of Indonesian cities. In a press conference, police announced they were investigating 6 protestors who they claimed were affiliated with the anarchist movement.

== See also ==
- Category:Indonesian anarchists
- List of anarchist movements by region
- Anarchism in China
- Anarchism in the Netherlands
- Anarchism in Singapore
- Anarchism in Timor-Leste
- Kekal
