= Wong Sau Ying =

Chinese anarchist (1898–1927)

- 黃素英
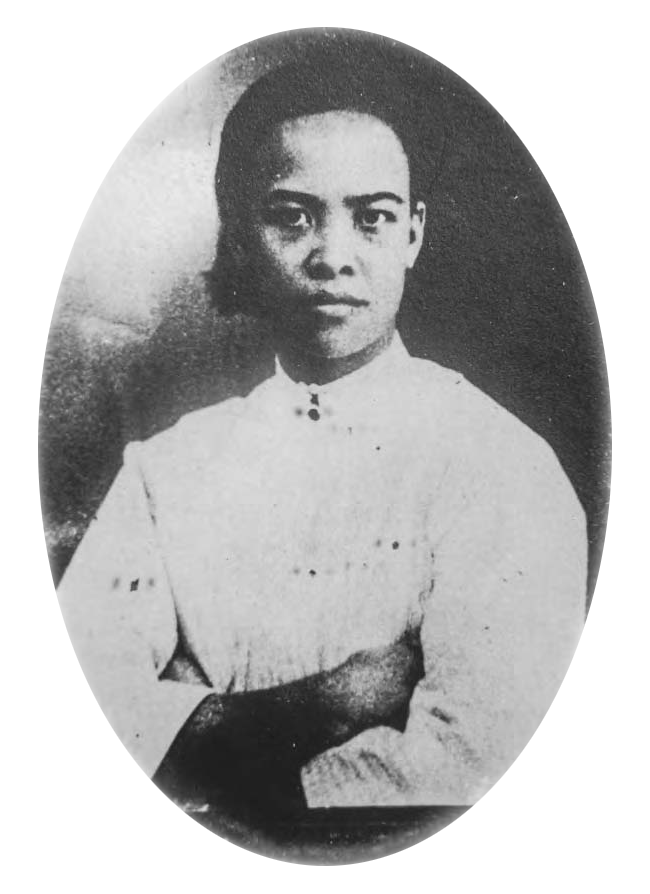
- Wong (c. 1925)
- Born: c. 1898; China
- Died: 25 March 1927 (aged around 28–29); Pudu Prison, Kuala Lumpur, British Malaya
- Other name: Wong Sang
- Movement: Anarchism
- Motive: Unclear
- Criminal charges: Attempted murder
- Penalty: 10 years imprisonment

Details
- Date: 23 January 1925
- Country: British Malaya
- Locations: Chinese Protectorate, Kuala Lumpur
- Injured: 2–3 (Note: C. F. Yong says Protector Daniel Richards, his assistant Wilfred Blythe, and Wong herself were all injured. Tim Harper says that both Richards and Wong were rushed to hospital because of their injuries but does not mention Blythe being injured. Ummu Atiyah Ahmad Zakuan says that Richards and two of his associates were injured.)
- Weapon: Improvised explosive device
- Imprisoned at: Pudu Prison

Wong Sau Ying (Chinese: 黃素英; (Note: Also transliterated as Wong So-ying.) c. 1898 – 1927), also known by her alias Wong Sang, (Note: The name she gave to the British authorities, which they translated to mean "Life's Victim".) was a Chinese anarchist, known for her attempt to assassinate colonial officials in British Malaya.

Born in Imperial China, she moved in 1919 to British Malaya, where she became involved in the Malayan anarchist movement. Her lover, a Malayan anarchist, was deported by the British authorities and shot by order of the Chinese authorities. By 1925, she was plotting to assassinate Laurence Guillemard, the British High Commissioner of Malaya, but missed her opportunity. She then went to the Chinese Protectorate in Kuala Lumpur, where she detonated a bomb, injuring a colonial official and herself.

Her trial became a spectacle, in part due to the fixation of both the press and the British administration on her bob cut. She was reported to have smiled calmly through the proceedings, pleading guilty and refusing to explain her actions. Although the prosecution understood her to have had vague anarchist political motivations, the British authorities were unable to provide a clear explanation for her motives. She was sentenced to 10 years in prison, where she committed suicide by hanging.

In the wake of the bombing case, the Malayan anarchist movement came under heavy political repression, severely weakening it. Chinese women with bob cuts also came under suspicion, as press and state authorities began to associate the haircut with anarchist political motivations.

== Early life and activism ==
Wong Sau Ying was born in China, c. 1898. (Note: She falsely reported that she had been born in Penang, and that after her father was deported, she moved with him to Canton, where he was later killed.) She spent time in Beijing and Shanghai, and from an early age, she was involved with the Chinese anarchist movement in Canton. By 1919, she had moved to Penang, in British Malaya. She was one of the first Chinese women to become involved in politics in Malaya, where women were largely involved in social issues and did not engage with politics. She also dressed in a modern fashion, keeping her hair cut short and refusing to wear a hat, which made her stand out among the women of her day.

She soon joined the Malayan anarchist movement, in which her lover Mak Peng-cho and her husband Leung Yuet-Yu (Note: Tim Harper calls him "Leung Man".) were prominent members. When Mak's house was raided by police, who discovered pamphlets that implicated him in the Chinese anarchist movement, he was forced to flee to China, before returning again in May 1923. In July 1923, Mak was deported for his continued involvement in the anarchist movement. Wong followed him to Canton, where he was shot for his anarchist activities in February 1924, by order of the local Chinese authorities. In December 1924, she moved to Singapore, where she discovered her husband Leung had taken a mistress. She soon contacted the local anarchist movement, taking shelter with the anarcho-communist film-makers Luk Ngai-man and Wang Yu-ting, who worked for the same film company as her husband. According to the British colonial authorities, it was through Leung that Wang Yu-ting recruited Wong to the cause of the Anarchist Federation of Malaya.

== Assassination attempts ==
In early 1925, she plotted to assassinate Laurence Guillemard, the British high commissioner of Malaya, who she considered a representative of "a system which hinders the progress of the world". She purchased bomb-making materials, and together with her comrade Yat Mun, she tracked Guillemard's movements throughout the peninsula. She missed her chance to assassinate him at the Penang golf course and again when he was on board a train to Kuala Lumpur, as he got off early to visit the Sultan of Kuala Kangsar. She decided to continue with her explosives to Kuala Lumpur, where she planned to attack the Chinese Protectorate.

On 23 January 1925, Chinese New Year's Eve, she made her way to the Protector's office, carrying a briefcase. In the office, she came face to face with Protector Daniel Richards and his assistant Wilfred Blythe. She claimed that someone was threatening her and gave Richards her briefcase, saying a friend had told her to give it to him. She opened the case and stepped back as it exploded, blowing a hole in the table and showering the room with shrapnel. Richards and Wong, both injured and unconscious, were rushed to nearby hospitals. The lightly packed bomb had failed to kill its target, although Richards lost the use of one of his hands. Wong had shrapnel removed from her arms, face and torso, all the while under armed guard.

The attack became a sensational story in the British press, which dubbed Wong "the bobbed-hair woman" and wildly speculated about her identity and motive. The "Kuala Lumpur Bomb Outrage", as it became known, was the most striking violent attack committed by the Malayan anarchist movement up until that point.

== Trial and imprisonment ==
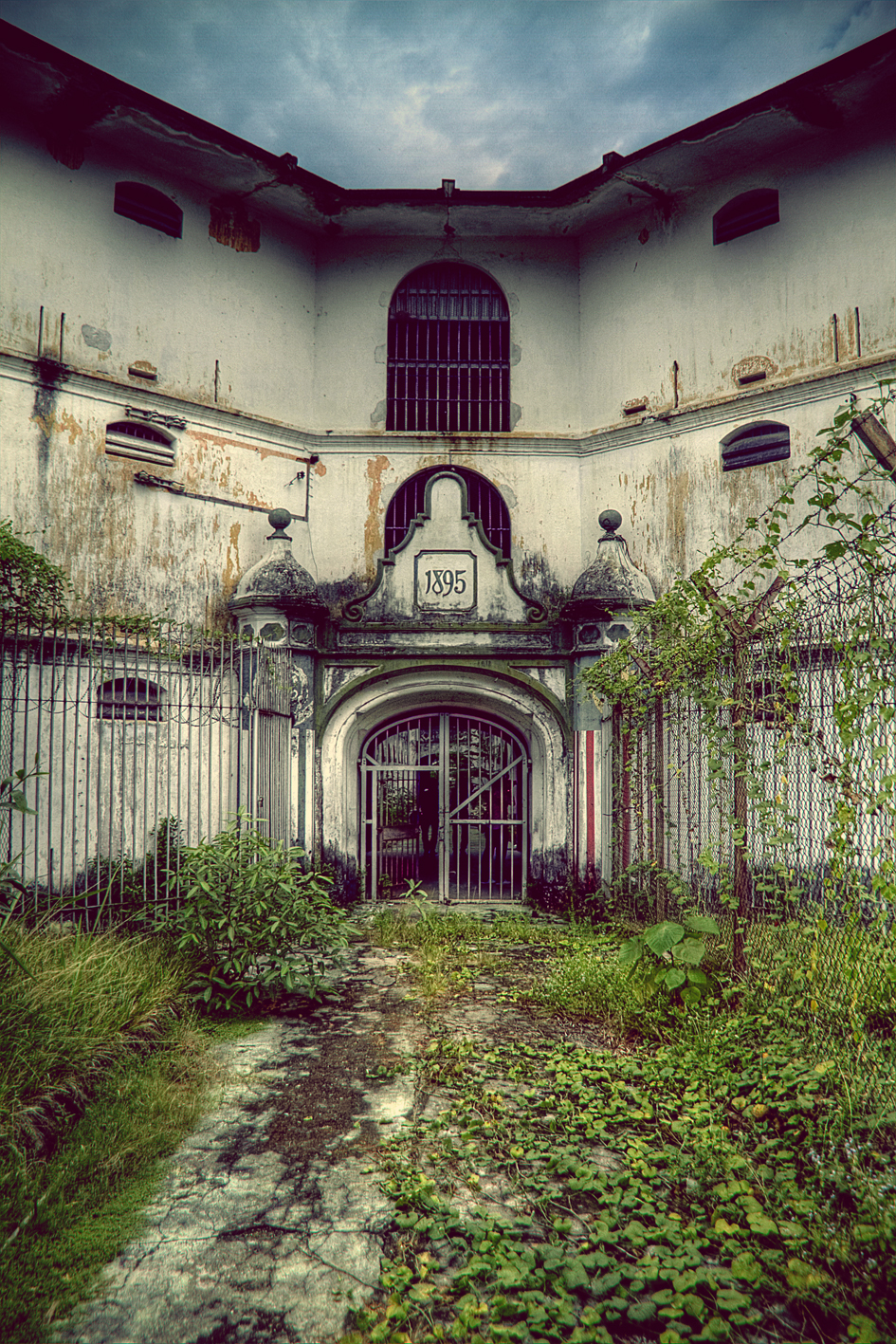
Interior of Pudu Prison, where Wong was held

She first appeared in court six days after the attack; the press that reported on the trial were obsessed with her appearance, from her short hair to her scars. At another appearance in court in February, when her name was finally revealed to the public, she was noted to appear calm when walking to the dock and smile when the charges against her were read. The British colonial authorities considered her "new style", from her haircut to her education and grievances with the world order, to be at the centre of the case.

On 23 March, her trial at the Assizes began; the trial was conducted entirely in the English language and according to English legal customs. Historian Tim Harper compared the process to a court martial. With no legal representation and having called no witnesses, she pleaded guilty, admitting to bombing the Protectorate. She asked for leniency in her sentencing, saying with a smile: "I have a very bad temper". When the inquiry turned to her motives, the public prosecutor stated that "she has got some weird notions about the brotherhood of man". He further explained that she had made "very loose, wild sort of anarchical statements", but had not said anything personally against Richards himself.

Despite putting her under interrogation, the British authorities were ultimately unable to determine the exact motive for her attack. By May 1925, British authorities had come up with four possible explanations for the attack: either she had been directed to carry out the attack by Wang Yu-Ting, on behalf of the Anarchist Federation of Malaya; she had blamed the British colonial government for her lover's deportation and subsequent death; she wanted to express disapproval for the purging of "politically undesirable" Chinese teachers from Malayan schools; or she had been directed to carry it out by the Canton Anarchist Federation, in order to convince the British government of "the power of the anarchist party". Irrespective of her motive, Wong was convicted of attempted murder, for which she was sentenced to 10 years in prison. The British press reported that she had listened to her sentence with a smile.

She was imprisoned in Pudu Prison, where she was held in a women's house; she was one of about nine women prisoners there. She was visited there by one of her intended victims, Wilfred Blythe, whom she told about her desire to see the existing "wicked" world order overthrown and replaced with communism. She caused trouble in prison, both for the supervisors and her fellow prisoners. After a year in prison, she appealed for remission, which the responsible government officials happily dismissed. By the following year, she had grown exhausted with prison life. On 25 March 1927, she committed suicide by hanging.

== Legacy ==
Worried by the possibility of another bombing, the British colonial authorities moved to pre-empt any possible attack by carrying out a mass arrest and deportation of Malayan anarchists, including Wong's husband Leung. British authorities deported several Chinese anarchists from Malaya and brought the Malayan anarchist movement under closer surveillance, further investigating the Anarchist Federation in Malaya and the anarchist periodical Yik Khuan Poh. The British authorities even went as far as to ban the Kuomintang, following the rise to power of the Chinese anarchist Wang Jingwei. The Malayan anarchist movement was never able to recover from the political repression that followed the bombing.

Wong's bob cut, which was a new favourite haircut for Asian women, also caused a moral panic in the press over modern women's fashion choices and the possible links they might have to anarchism. British police officers, believing that "bobbed-hair women" presented a danger to polite society, began to track their movements in Malaya. One Chinese woman, Leeong Soo, was followed by police and her activities reported in the press, under suspicion that she was connected with Wong. British and French authorities came to believe that Wong had been part of a global anarchist conspiracy, aiming to attack their colonial administrations. French police discovered Wong's photograph in the possession of some exiled Vietnamese anarchists in Canton.

== Bibliography ==
- Harper, Tim (2021). Underground Asia: Global Revolutionaries and the Assault on Empire. Harvard University Press. ISBN 978-0-674-72461-7.
- Yong, C. F. (1991). "Origins and Development of the Malayan Communist Movement, 1919–1930". Modern Asian Studies. 25 (4): 625–648. doi:10.1017/S0026749X00010787. JSTOR 312747.
- Yong, C. F. (1997). "Anarcho-Communism – The Harbinger of the Malayan Communist Movement, 1919–1925". The Origins of Malayan Communism. Singapore: South Seas Society. pp. 13–40. ISBN 9971-936-12-7.
- Zakuan, Ummu Atiyah Ahmad (2022) [2019]. "Women in Politics in Malaysia". Women in the House: Leadership in the Malaysian Parliament. International Islamic University Malaysia. pp. 13–44. ISBN 978-967-491-122-5.
