= Keat Gin Ooi =

Malaysian academician and educator (born 1959)

Keat Gin Ooi PJK (Penang)
- 黃吉仁
- Born: 10 October 1959 (age 67); George Town, Penang, Malaya (present-day Malaysia)
- Education: Universiti Sains Malaysia (BA); National University of Singapore (MA); University of Hull (PhD)
- Notable work: Southeast Asia: A Historical Encyclopedia, from Angkor Wat to East Timor
- Spouse: Beh Swee Im (m. 2002)

Academic work
- Sub-discipline: Women's history, history of Southeast Asia, war studies, underwater archaeology, and history of Borneo and Brunei
- Institutions: Universiti Sains Malaysia; Universiti Brunei Darussalam

Chinese name
- Simplified Chinese: 黄吉仁
- Traditional Chinese: 黃吉仁
Transcriptions
Standard Mandarin
- Hanyu Pinyin: Huáng Jírén
Yue: Cantonese
- Jyutping: Huon1 Jieh4 Ngan4
Southern Min
- Hokkien POJ: Ûiⁿ Kiat-jîn

Keat Gin Ooi (Chinese: 黃吉仁; Pe̍h-ōe-jī: Ûiⁿ Kiat-jîn; pinyin: Huáng Jírén; born 10 October 1959) is a Malaysian academician, historian and educator of Chinese descent who is a professor at the Modern History of Brunei/Borneo in Universiti Brunei Darussalam's Academy of Brunei Studies. He is specialises in the following fields: women in history, Southeast Asian history, war and conflict, indigenous historical sources, underwater archaeology, underwater cultural heritage, modern history and historiography of Borneo, Brunei history, colonial urban history, Borneo in international history.

Ooi has been a visiting lecturer and recipient of fellowships from institutions in the United States, Australia, the United Kingdom, Europe, and Japan. He has worked as a professional reviewer for several journals in addition to publishing with publishers such as Universiti Sains Malaysia (USM), Oxford, Palgrave Macmillan, and Routledge.

== Early life and education ==
Ooi Keat Gin was born on 10 October 1959, in George Town, Penang, Malaya. Ethnic Chinese in descent, his parents are Ai Gek, a housewife, and Ewe Boo, a manager of a rubber plantation. He attended Universiti Sains Malaysia, graduating with a Bachelor of Arts (Hons) in 1983. This was followed by a Master of Arts degree from the National University of Singapore in 1991 and a Doctor of Philosophy degree from the University of Hull, England, in 1995.

== Career ==
From 1983 to 1988, Ooi worked as a department head and high school history teacher in Sarawak, Malaysia. From 1989 to 1990, he was employed as a senior high school teacher in Penang. He began working at Universiti Sains Malaysia in Penang in 1991 as an assistant lecturer. From 1992 to 1995, he held the position of senior research fellow; from 1995 to 2002, he lectured; and from 2002 onward, he was an associate professor of history. In addition, Ooi worked for Leong San Tong Khoo Kongsi from 1997 to 2001 as a historian and consultant in addition to her roles as advisor, board member, and historian at the State Museum of Penang from 1996 to 2005. In addition, from 2004 to 2005, he served on the State Art Gallery committee.

Ooi was a professor at the History of Malaysia/Southeast Asia at the Universiti Sains Malaysia's School of Humanities. Since 2002, he has served as the coordinator of the Asia Pacific Research Unit (APRU-USM). He was the founding editor-in-chief of the International Journal of Asia Pacific Studies (IJAPS), which is indexed by Scopus, from 2005 until his forced retirement in 2019.

== Research and publications ==
Ooi's interest in Borneo, of some forty years' standing, began with his first trip to Kuching, Sarawak. His Borneo studies then continued at Simunjan, a region that was previously heavily communist-occupied. His research has since covered all Borneo's regions - present-day Sabah, Sarawak, Labuan, Brunei, and Kalimantan - with a concentration on the White Rajahs, British colonial control, the Pacific War, and Japan's military presence. Apart from Borneo, Ooi's scholarly pursuits encompass metropolitan areas such as George Town, Penang, and historiography, specifically in the context of secondary and university education. He is now studying international history and biographies with the goal of researching the historical personalities and regional relations of Borneo.

Books and monographs by Ooi include:

- The History of St. Xavier's Institution, Penang, 1852-1992. Penang, Malaysia: La Salle Christian Brothers and St Xavier's Institution. 1992. p. 150.
- World beyond the Rivers: Education in Sarawak from Brooke Rule to Colonial Office Administration, 1841-1963. (Special Publication Series). Hull, England: Department for South-East Asian Studies, University of Hull. 1996. ISBN 0-85958-902-1.
- Of Free Trade and Native Interests: The Brookes and the Economic Development of Sarawak, 1841-1941. (South-East Asian Historical Monograph Series). Kuala Lumpur: Oxford University Press. 1997. p. 456. ISBN 9789835600234.
- Rising Sun over Borneo: The Japanese Occupation of Sarawak, 1941-1945. London and Basingstoke; New York: St. Martin's Press. 1999. p. 158. ISBN 978-0312217143.
- Malaysia. Rev. ed. (World Bibliographical Series). Oxford: ABC-Clio. 1999. p. 490. ISBN 9781851093113.
- One Hundred Years of Tin Smelting, 1898-1998. Penang, Malaysia: Escoy Smelting. 2001. p. 100.
- Alam di Sebalik Sungai: Pendidikan di Sarawak dari Zaman Pemerintahan Brooke ke Pentadbiran Pejabat Penjajah British, 1841-1963 (in Malay). Penang, Malaysia: Penerbit Universiti Sains Malaysia. (Malay translation of World Beyond the Rivers [Hull, 1996]). 2001. p. 196. ISBN 9839700979.
- From Colonial Outpost to Cosmopolitan Centre: The Growth and Development of George Town, Penang, from late 18th century to late 20th century. (APARP Southeast Asia Research Paper no. 57.). Taipei, Taiwan: Asia-Pacific Research Program, Academia Sinica. July 2002. p. 137.
- Traumas and Heroism: The European Community in Sarawak during the Pacific War and Japanese Occupation, 1941-1945. Kota Kinabalu: Opus Publications. 2007. p. 278. ISBN 9789833987023.
- Enter the Dragons: A History of the Penang Dragon Boat Festival Malaysia. Kuala Lumpur: Ministry of Unity, Culture, Arts and Heritage Malaysia. 2008. p. 120. ISBN 9789833374205.
- Historical Dictionary of Malaysia. New Edition. Lanham, Maryland: Scarecrow Press. 2009. p. 419. ISBN 9780810876415.
- "Baik, Buruk, dan Dasyat": Pelbagai Wajah Peperangan dan Akibatnya terhadap Asia Tenggara pada Kurun Kedua Puluh" ["The Good, the Bad, and the Ugly": The Many Faces of War and Its Consequences on Southeast Asia in the Twentieth Century"] (in Malay). Penang: USM Press. 2010. ISBN 978-983-861-471-9.
- The Japanese Occupation of Borneo, 1941-1945. London: Routledge. 2011. p. 199. ISBN 978-0-415-45663-0.
- Post-war Borneo, 1945-1950: Nationalism, Empire, and State-building. London: Routledge. 2013. p. 222. ISBN 9781134058037.
- Historical Dictionary of Malaysia. 2nd ed. Historical Dictionaries of Asia, Oceania, and the Middle East. Lanham, Maryland: Rowman & Littlefield. 2018. p. 686. ISBN 978-1538108840.
- A Story of George Town, Pulau Pinang, Malaysia c.1780s to c.2000s. Kuala Lumpur: Dewan Bahasa dan Pustaka. 2019. p. 191. ISBN 978-983-49-1962-7.
- Borneo in the Cold War, 1950-1990. London: Routledge. 2020. p. 374. ISBN 978-1-138-91078-2.

== Professional and scholarly bodies ==
Ooi belongs to a number of professional and scholarly associations, such as the Malaysian Historical Society (Penang chapter), the European Association for Southeast Asian Studies, and the Malaysian Association for the Prevention of Tuberculosis. In addition, he is a member of the Malaysian Branch of the Royal Asiatic Society and a fellow of the Royal Historical Society in England. Ooi is a life member of the Old Frees' Association and the Sarawak Association in England. She is also connected to the Sabah Society and the Association of South-East Asian Studies in the United Kingdom (ASEASUK). The following honours have been conferred upon him:

== Honours ==
- 1997: ASEASUK Award for Best Doctoral Dissertation (1994–1996), ASEASUK
- 2002: Meritorious Service Medal (PJK), for valuable and devoted services to the state of Penang, Malaysia
- 2004: Citation for Best Reference Work, Library Journal, 2004 (for Southeast Asia: A Historical Encyclopedia, from Angkor Wat to East Timor)
- 2005: Outstanding Academic Title, Choice, 2005 (for Southeast Asia: A Historical Encyclopedia, from Angkor Wat to East Timor)
- 2015: CREAM Award, Ministry of Higher Education Malaysia, for International Journal of Asia Pacific Studies (IJAPS), Founder-Editor-in-Chief
- 2016: CREAM Award, Ministry of Higher Education Malaysia, for International Journal of Asia Pacific Studies (IJAPS), Founder-Editor-in-Chief
- 2018: CREAM Award, Ministry of Higher Education Malaysia, for International Journal of Asia Pacific Studies (IJAPS), Founder-Editor-in-Chief

== Personal life ==
On 20 October 2002, Ooi married cardiac technologist Beh Swee Im. His interests include travel, cooking, reading, and spending time with his family, and he is interested in Buddhism, Daoism, and Confucianism.
