= Philip Arnold Anthony =

British civil engineer (1873-1949)

Philip Arnold Anthony CMG (1873 – 16 July 1949) was a British railway engineer who was head of the Federated Malay States Railways from 1910 to 1924. While in office, he oversaw the considerable development of the railway network in Malaya.

== Early life and education ==
Anthony was born in 1873 in Plymouth, the son of Rev Frederick Anthony. He was educated at Mill Hill School.

== Career ==
Anthony joined the engineering department of Great Western Railway in 1894 and remained with the company until 1910, serving as resident engineer in connection with the company's route to the West of England.

In 1910, Anthony was appointed general manager and chief engineer of Federated Malay States Railways by the Secretary of State for the Colonies, succeeding Charles Spooner, and remained in office until 1924. During his 14 years in the post, he oversaw the considerable expansion and improvement of the rail network in Malaya. Notable achievements included: the opening of the through service to Bangkok (1918); the opening of the Johore Causeway which created a direct rail link between Singapore and the mainland (1923); the extension of the Eastern Railway through undeveloped jungle territory; major improvement works at Kuala Lumpur, Ipoh and Prai; the opening of the Penang Hill Railway (1923), and the completion of the Guillemard Bridge over the Kelantan River, then the largest railway bridge in Malaya.

From 1915-16, Anthony was seconded by Federated Malay States Railways to the Ministry of Munitions. In 1918, he was granted a Royal Commission to enquire into and report on the workings of the South Australian Railways for the Australian government.

After resigning as head of Federated Malay States Railways in 1925, he was sent by the Colonies Office to report on the working of the Palestine Railways, and in the following year, acted as chief engineer to the Crown Agents for the Colonies in Nyasaland, advising the government on questions of railway extensions, surveys and river navigation. In 1927, he set up in private practice as a consulting engineer in London.

== Personal life and death ==
Anthony married Edith John and they had two daughters.

Anthony died on 16 July 1949 in Otford, Kent.

== Honours ==
Anthony was appointed Companion of the Order of St Michael and St George (CMG) in the 1918 New Year Honours.
