= Huiminglu =

Defunct Chinese anarchist magazine

Huiminglu (simplified Chinese: 《晦鸣录》; traditional Chinese: 《晦鳴錄》; pinyin: huìmíng lù; lit. 'Cock Crow Journal'), also titled with Pingminzhisheng (simplified Chinese: 《平民之声》; traditional Chinese: 《平民之聲》; lit. 'Voice of the Common People'), later known as Minsheng (simplified Chinese: 《民声》; traditional Chinese: 《民聲》; pinyin: mínshēng; lit. 'Voice of the People'; Esperanto: La Voco de la popolo) was the organ magazine published by the Cock-Crow Society, an anarchist society founded by Liu Shifu. A leading anarchist weekly magazine in the 1910s, the magazine was established in 1913, and changed its name to Minsheng the following year.

== History ==
In 1912, Liu Shifu co-founded the Cock-Crow Society in Guangzhou. In August, Liu founded the magazine, drafted the preface to the first volume and declared his political platform to be "communism, anti-militarism, anarcho-syndicalism, anti-religion and anti-family, vegetarianism, unification of language, and the great harmony of all countries." As Yuan Shikai became the first President of the Republic of China and attempted to seize more power, the magazine attracted the attention of the government. In July 1913, the magazine as well as the society was ordered to suspend by Long Jiguang, governor of Guangdong. One month later, Liu re-established and renamed the magazine in Macau.

The magazine was thought to contribute the ideological development of labor movement in China, as it criticized the state socialism advocated by Sun Yat-sen and Jiang Kanghu, arguing social revolution could only be carried by common people.

Though moving to Macau in 1913, the magazine moved to the Shanghai International Settlement under the pressure of the Portuguese Macau government again after publishing another two issues. The magazine stopped its publication in 1916 after Liu's death, and re-opened and then stopped again in 1921.
