= Karai, Perak =

Town in Perak, Malaysia

Coordinates: 4°51′N 100°58′E

Karai
- Karai in Kuala Kangsar District
- Country: Malaysia
- State: Perak
- District: Kuala Kangsar

Karai is a small town in Mukim Kota Lama Kanan, Kuala Kangsar District, Perak, Malaysia. The town is also called Enggor. The town grew due to the coal industry.

One of the famous attractions is the historical Victoria Railway Bridge.b
