= Victoria Bridge, Malaysia =

Sungai Perak Railway Bridge Jambatan Victoria
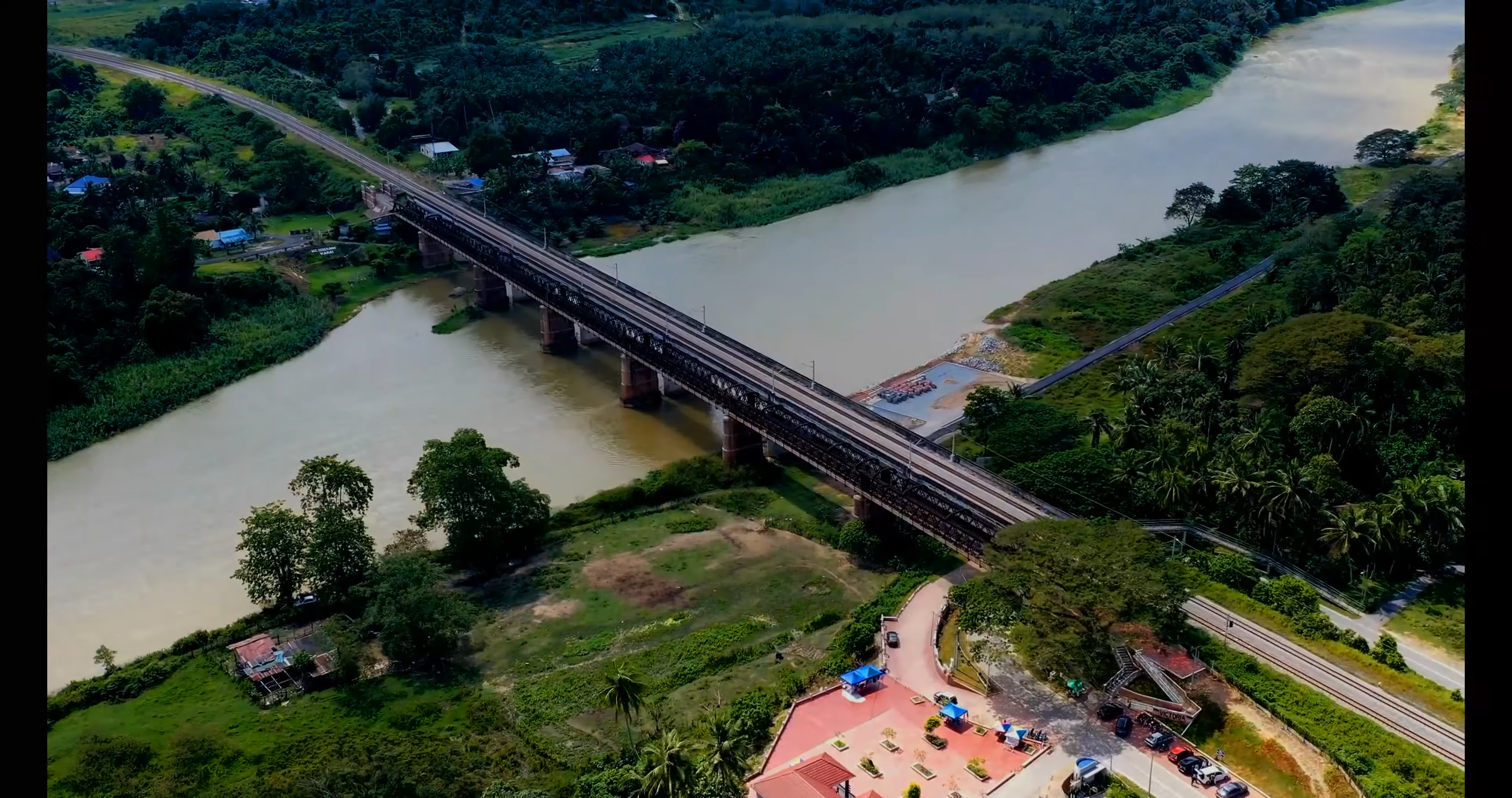
- Coordinates: 4°50′13″N 100°57′44″E
- Carries: Locomotive (formerly); Pedestrian
- Crosses: Perak River
- Locale: Kuala Kangsar District
- Official name: Victoria Bridge
- Other name: Enggor Bridge
- Maintained by: Keretapi Tanah Melayu Berhad (KTMB)

Characteristics
- Design: Double-intersection Warren truss bridge
- Total length: 353 m
- Width: 3.6 m
- Piers in water: 6
- Clearance below: 12 m

History
- Engineering design by: GW Fryer, CR Hanson
- Construction cost: $300,000
- Opened: March 1900; 126 years ago
- Closed: 2002

Location
- Interactive map of Sungai Perak Railway Bridge

Victoria Bridge is a single track railway truss bridge located in Karai, Kuala Kangsar District, Perak, Malaysia. It is one of the oldest railway bridges in the country, although it is no longer in use and has been converted into a tourist attraction.

== Etymology ==
Victoria Bridge was named after Queen Victoria, who ruled the United Kingdom from 1837 to 1901.

== History ==
Victoria Bridge was constructed between December 1897 and March 1900 by the Perak Government Railway as a crossing over the Perak River to serve the local tin mining industry. It cost $300,000 and was considered the largest railway project even carried out in Malaya at the time. The bridge was officially opened by the late Almarhum DYMM Sultan Idris Murshidul Adzam Shah I, the Sultan of Perak at that time, in a ceremony also attended by Sir Frank Swettenham, the first resident general of the Federated Malay States.

Spanning the Perak River, the bridge was linked to a railway line to Sungai Siput and Kuala Kangsar and served to transport natural resources from Perai in the north to Singapore in the south for export.

During the Japanese occupation of Malaya in 1941, the British army attempted to impede the Japanese invasion southward by partly destroying the bridge. It was repaired after the end of the war. Barracks and additional security features were added during the period of Malayan Emergency.

Starting in 1992, Victoria Bridge was managed by Railway Assets Corporation. The Railway Assets Corporation (RAC) is a federal statutory body under the Ministry of Transport. It was established under the Railways Act 1991 (Act 463) through Government Gazette No.16 Volume 36 on July 30, 1992.

The Victoria Bridge remained in use until 2002, when a wider concrete girder bridge built parallel to the old bridge was completed to take over handling rail traffic. The new bridge is significantly wider, with room to support a second track, but in its early service was only required to support a single track prior to double tracking and electrification between the Ipoh-Padang Besar line during the late-2000s and early-2010s.

== Current state ==
While the old Victoria Bridge is closed to rail traffic, its adjoining footbridge is still publicly open to motorcycles and pedestrians. Attempts have been made to retain the structure, with occasional maintenance having been conducted on it. To improve safety, especially for motorcyclists, the bridge and the surrounding areas were illuminated with lights, while fences or safety nets have been installed on the bridge itself. The Victoria Bridge and its nearby Enggor former railway station has become a minor tourist attraction, with signage set up to inform visitors about its history. It is a popular spot for photoshoots. In 2016, the bridge was gazetted as a national heritage site.

== Gallery ==
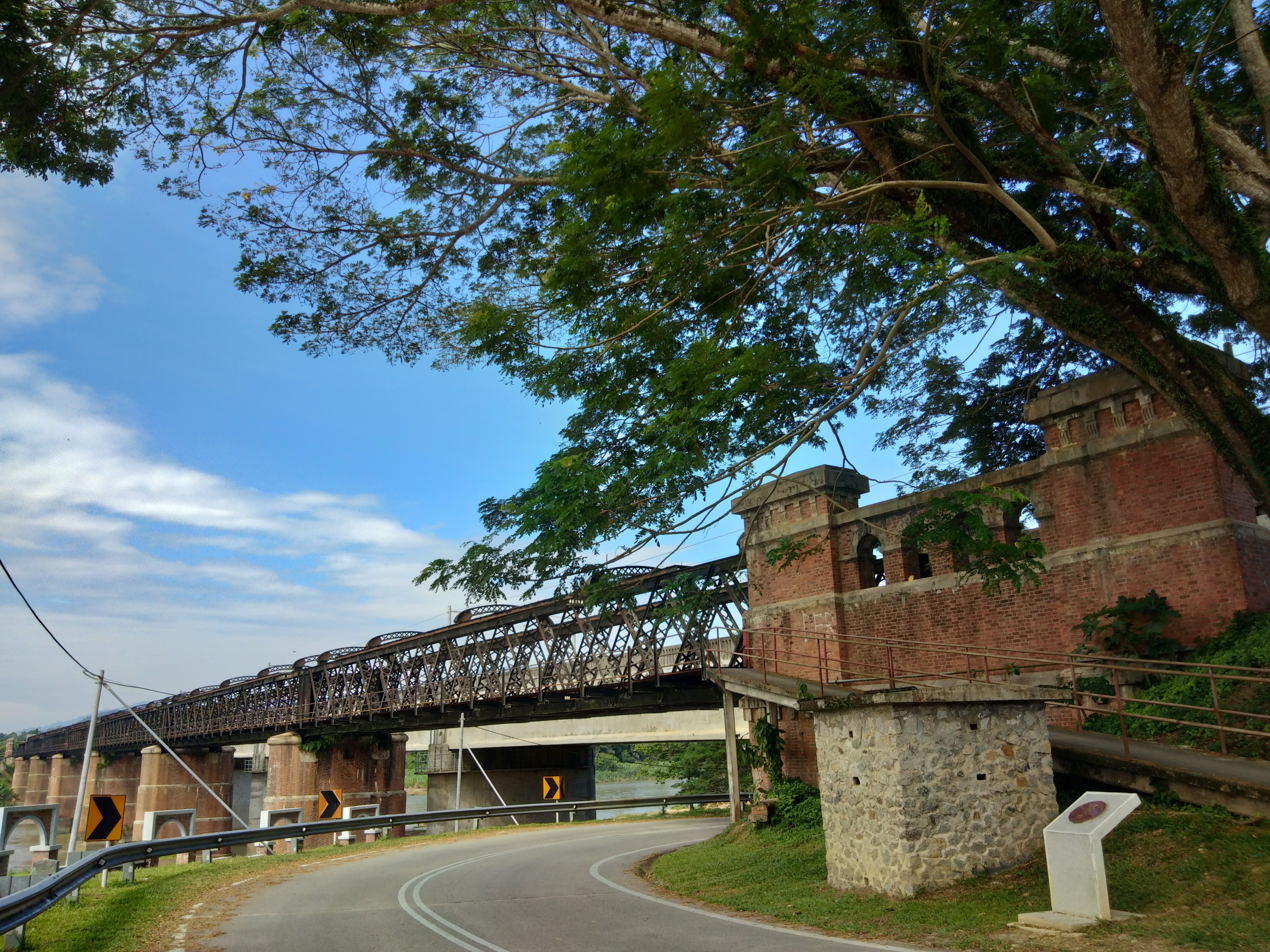
View of bridge

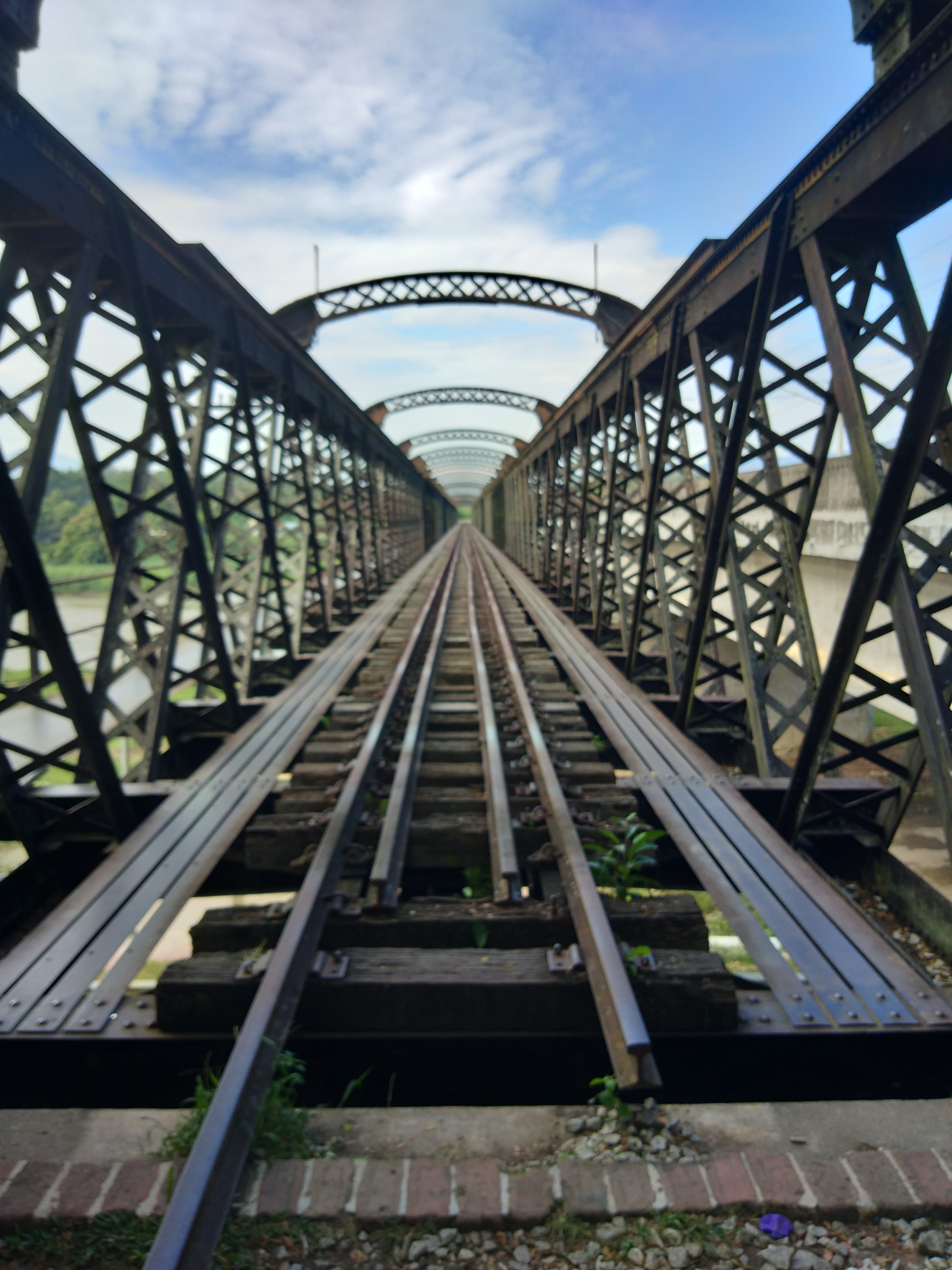
Rails

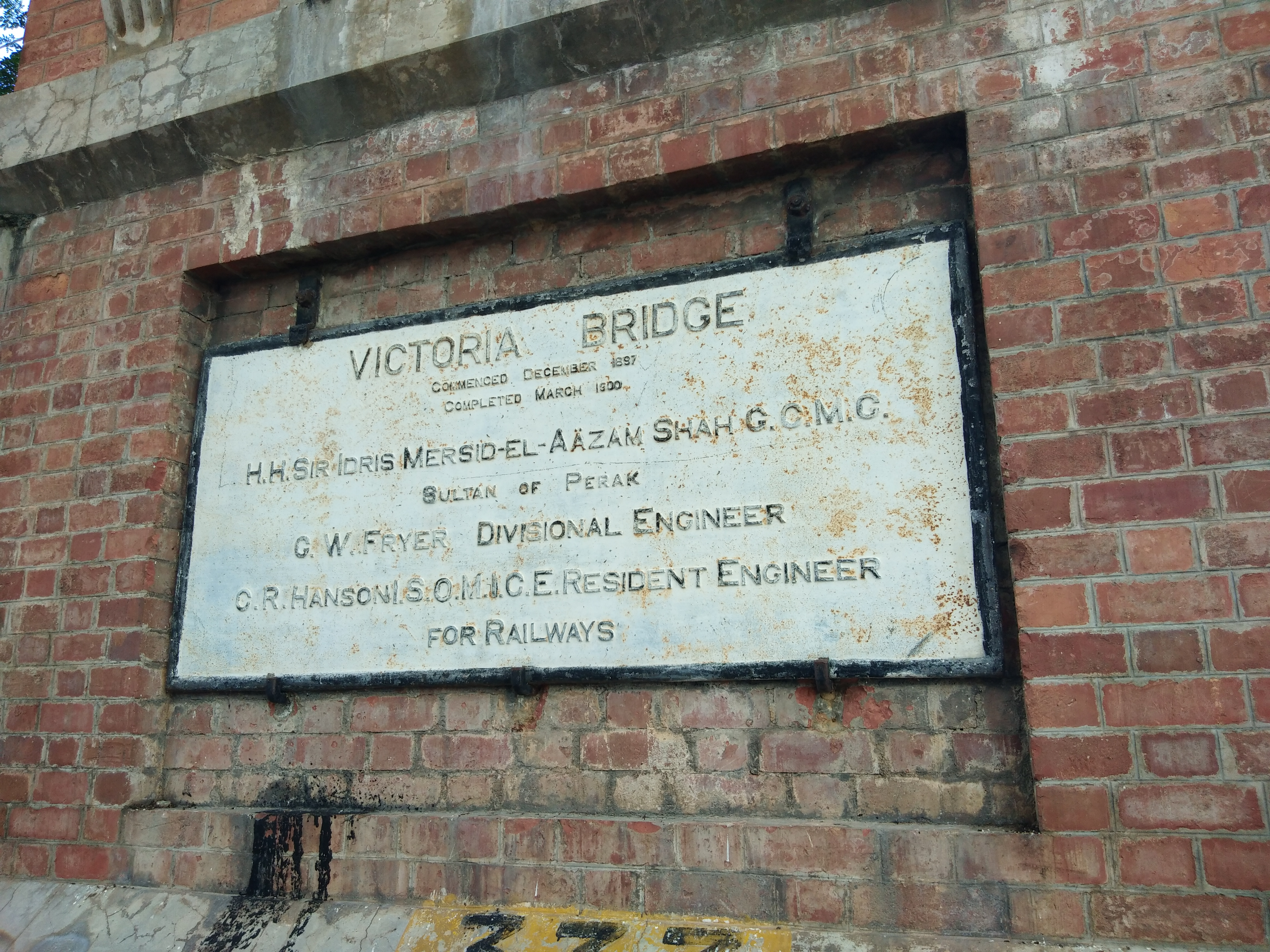
Sign

== See also ==
- Tourism in Malaysia
- Transport in Malaysia
- Guillemard Bridge, another colonial railway bridge in Malaysia
