= Goods and Services Tax (Malaysia) =

Abolished value-added tax in Malaysia

The Goods and Services Tax (GST) is an abolished value-added tax in Malaysia. GST is levied on most transactions in the production process, but is refunded with exception of Blocked Input Tax, to all parties in the chain of production other than the final consumer.

The existing standard rate for GST effective from 1 April 2015 is 6%. Many domestically consumed items such as fresh foods, water and electricity are zero-rated, while some supplies such as education and health services are GST exempted.

After Pakatan Harapan won the 2018 Malaysian general election, GST was reduced to 0% on 1 June 2018. The then Government of Malaysia tabled the first reading of the Bill to repeal GST in Parliament on 31 July 2018 (Dewan Rakyat). GST was replaced with the Sales Tax and Service Tax starting 1 September 2018.

== Background ==
GST was scheduled to be implemented by the government during the third quarter of 2011, but the implementation was delayed until 1 April 2015. Its purpose was to replace the sales and service tax which has been used in the country for several decades. The government is seeking additional revenue to offset its budget deficit and reduce its dependence on revenue from Petronas, Malaysia's state-owned oil company. The 6% tax will replace a sales-and-service tax of between 5–15%.

The Goods and Services Tax Bill 2009 was tabled for its first reading at the Dewan Rakyat (the lower house of the Malaysian parliament) on 16 December 2009. It was delayed amid mounting criticism. The government responded by asserting that the tax on oil income will not be sustainable in the future. National Consumer Complaints Centre head Muhammad Sha’ani Abdullah has said, "The government should create more awareness on what the GST is. The public cannot be blamed for their lack of understanding, and thus, their fears". Sha’ani says that the GST will improve accounting, reduce tax fraud, and facilitate enforcement of the upcoming Anti-Profiteering Act. Muslim Consumer Association of Malaysia leader Datuk Dr. Ma’amor Osman said the GST could help end dishonest business practices, but expressed concern about how the tax would be applied to medical products and services. A group leading the campaign against the GST, Protes (which objects to the GST because of concerns about its effects on low-income Malaysians), cancelled a planned protest but has stated that they will continue to agitate against the legislation.

During the government reading of the 2015 budget, Malaysian Prime Minister Najib Razak announced a GST tax of 6% starting on 1 April 2015. This will replace the Sales and Services Tax. Implementing GST tax will be a part of the Government's tax reform program to enhance the capability, effectiveness and transparency of tax administration and management. The GST was implemented on 1 April 2015.

By June 2015, worldwide crude oil prices fell to half its value, with several nations & oil industries considering it a crisis. The income from the newly implemented GST managed to supplant Malaysia's national budget from the deficit induced by a loss in oil tax revenue. On 7 March 2016, the Yang di-Pertuan Agong Abdul Halim congratulated the government for implementing GST.

By May 2018, the new Malaysian government, led by Mahathir Mohamad, decided to reintroduce the Sales and Services tax after completely scrapping GST. The GST standard rate has been revised to 0% beginning 1 June 2018, pending the total removal of the Goods and Services Tax Act in parliament.

== Zero-rated and exempted supplies ==
Certain good and services, mainly for domestic use and essential services, are categorized as zero-rated supplies and exempted supplies. Zero-rated supplies are taxable supplies that are taxed at a GST of 0%; exempted supplies are non-taxable supplies that are not subjected to GST. While the net effect on consumers for both zero-rated and exempted supplies is the same, i.e. consumers do not pay any GST, the difference lies in the input tax credit claim by businesses. For zero-rated supplies, while GST is charged at the zero rate to the end consumer, businesses may claim input tax credit on the GST incurred in producing the supplies. On the other hand, for exempted supplies, businesses cannot charge GST to the end consumer, and they are not eligible to claim input tax credit on the GST incurred in producing the supplies.

Examples of zero-rated supplies:

1. Agricultural products – paddy, fresh or chilled vegetables, certain provisionally preserved vegetables
2. Essential foodstuff – oils, salt, flour, etc.
3. Livestocks and livestock supplies or poultry – live animals and unprocessed meat
4. Eggs
5. Fish – live, fresh, frozen and dried
6. First 300 kwh of electricity for domestic use
7. Water for domestic users
8. Goods supplied to designated areas from Malaysia – Labuan, Langkawi & Tioman
9. Exported goods
10. Exported services – such as architecture services in connection with land outside Malaysia
11. Selected services in Malaysia – such as pilotage, salvage or towage services
12. International services – such as transport of passengers or goods from a place in Malaysia to a place outside Malaysia
13. RON95 petrol, diesel and LPG
14. Sale of Residential Property
15. Services provided by Government which are not considered commercial services, such as permits, licences etc. Services considered commercial are TV advertisement, rental of equipments, rental of multifunction halls etc.

Examples of exempted supplies:

1. Financial Services
2. Public Transport Services
3. Private Education Services
4. Tolled Highways or Bridges
5. Childcare Services
6. Funeral, Burial and Cremation Services
7. Private Healthcare Services
8. Supplies Made by Societies
9. Residential Land or Building
10. Agriculture or General Use Land

== Protests ==
=== 2014 ===
The May Day Anti-GST Rally (Theme: "GST: Protest Till It's Dropped") was a rally held in Kuala Lumpur, Malaysia on May 1, 2014. The rally was organised by a coalition of 89 non-governmental organisations, including Oppressed People's Network, Parti Sosialis Malaysia, Solidariti Anak Muda Malaysia, and Asalkan Bukan UMNO among others, and was supported by the opposition Pakatan Rakyat. The rally, which coincided with International Workers' Day, was held in response to the Malaysian government's plan to introduce the goods and services tax on April 1, 2015. The rally saw participants march from Kuala Lumpur City Centre and other rally points in the city to the eventual destination, Dataran Merdeka.

=== 2015 ===
The May Day Anti-GST Rally (Theme: "GST: Protest Till It's Dropped") was a rally held in Kuala Lumpur, Malaysia on May 1, 2015. The rally was organised by a coalition of non-governmental organisations, including Oppressed People's Network, Parti Sosialis Malaysia, Solidariti Anak Muda Malaysia, and Asalkan Bukan UMNO among others, and was supported by the opposition Pakatan Rakyat. The rally, which coincided with International Workers' Day, was held in response to the Malaysian government's rollout of the goods and services tax from April 1, 2015. The rally saw participants march from various points in Kuala Lumpur to their eventual destination, Kuala Lumpur City Centre.

== Abolishment ==
Malaysia announced the "abolishment" of its Goods and Services Tax (GST) effective from 1 June 2018. For the first time since 1957, the ruling party's political power was handed over to the opposition coalition, Pakatan Harapan (PH), by the 14th general election, held on 9 May 2018. The PH manifesto stated that abolition's main objective is to put more purchasing power in the hands of the people, particularly those who earn lower or middle incomes. The Malaysian people widely view the GST as having contributed to a spike in living costs since it was introduced on 1 April 2015.

Finance Minister Lim Guan Eng said that as of 2019, the government stood firm on the people's mandate in the election to abolish the Barisan Nasional-imposed 6% GST. The Malaysian Institute of Economic Research (MIER) had called for the government to re-introduce the GST in the 2020 budget but at a lower rate of 3%. Lim said that had to be referred to the PH Presidential Council to decide on the mechanism to collect input from the people on the GST. He added that the GST had helped contain inflation at the rate of 1.5% in September 2019.

After the PH's downfall from Sheraton Move, Deputy Finance Minister I Abdul Rahim Bakri said that the country faced a revenue shortfall when the previous government replaced the GST with the SST and that GST collection was higher since the taxation system was more comprehensive and charged on all taxable goods and services at all stages. However, he admitted that there was a weakness in implementing the GST, which had indirectly affected the people. He said that the government would consider all parties' views and acceptance, including by the people, of the tax system's possible reintroduction in 2018. The debate on the Sales Tax (Amendment) Bill 2020 was winding up in Dewan Negara on 29 December.

In January 2021, Anwar Ibrahim acknowledged that the GST is the most transparent taxation system. The opposition leader said that if it was to be reintroduced, a review should be done. Ibrahim said that the GST could be implemented as soon as the economy was driven with more confidence.

In September 2021, ex-Prime Minister Najib Razak suggested for the GST to be reintroduced as soon as possible after the country had recovered from the COVID-19 pandemic. According to the Pekan MP, Malaysia could achieve the goal of reducing the income gap between the people in the country. Razak explained that GST also targeted the black economy in Malaysia, which was RM300 billion a year earlier and paid no taxes.

== Possible reinstatement ==
As of 2026, the government has indicated that any reinstatement of GST remains conditional on broader income growth. Deputy Finance Minister Liew Chin Tong stated in Parliament on 12 February 2026 that the government would only consider reinstating GST when the country's median wage exceeds RM4,000.

== See also ==
- Goods and Services Tax
- Goods and Services Tax (Vietnam)
- Goods and Services Tax (Japan)
- Goods and Services Tax (Laos)
- Goods and Services Tax (Kembodia)
- Goods and Services Tax (Pakistan)
- Goods and Services Tax (India)
- Goods and Services Tax (Indonesia)
- Goods and Services Tax (Bangladesh)
- Goods and Services Tax (Russia)
- Goods and Services Tax (Australia)
- Goods and Services Tax (Canada)
- Goods and Services Tax (German)
- Goods and Services Tax (New Zealand)
- Goods and Services Tax (Singapore)
