= Thomas Pittar =

English civil servant

Sir Thomas John Pittar, KCB, CMG (29 October 1846 – 20 July 1924) was an English civil servant. He spent his whole career at HM Customs, becoming a Commissioner of Customs in 1900 and then serving as Chairman of the Board of Customs from 1903 to 1908. He represented Britain at the Brussels Sugar Conference in 1901 and 1902 and at the Brussels Permanent Commission in 1903.

Government offices
Preceded by Sir Henry Primrose	Chairman of HM Customs; 1903–1908	Succeeded by Sir Laurence Guillemard
