= Guillemard Bridge =

Guillemard Railway Bridge Jambatan Guillemard جمبتن ڬويلليمارد
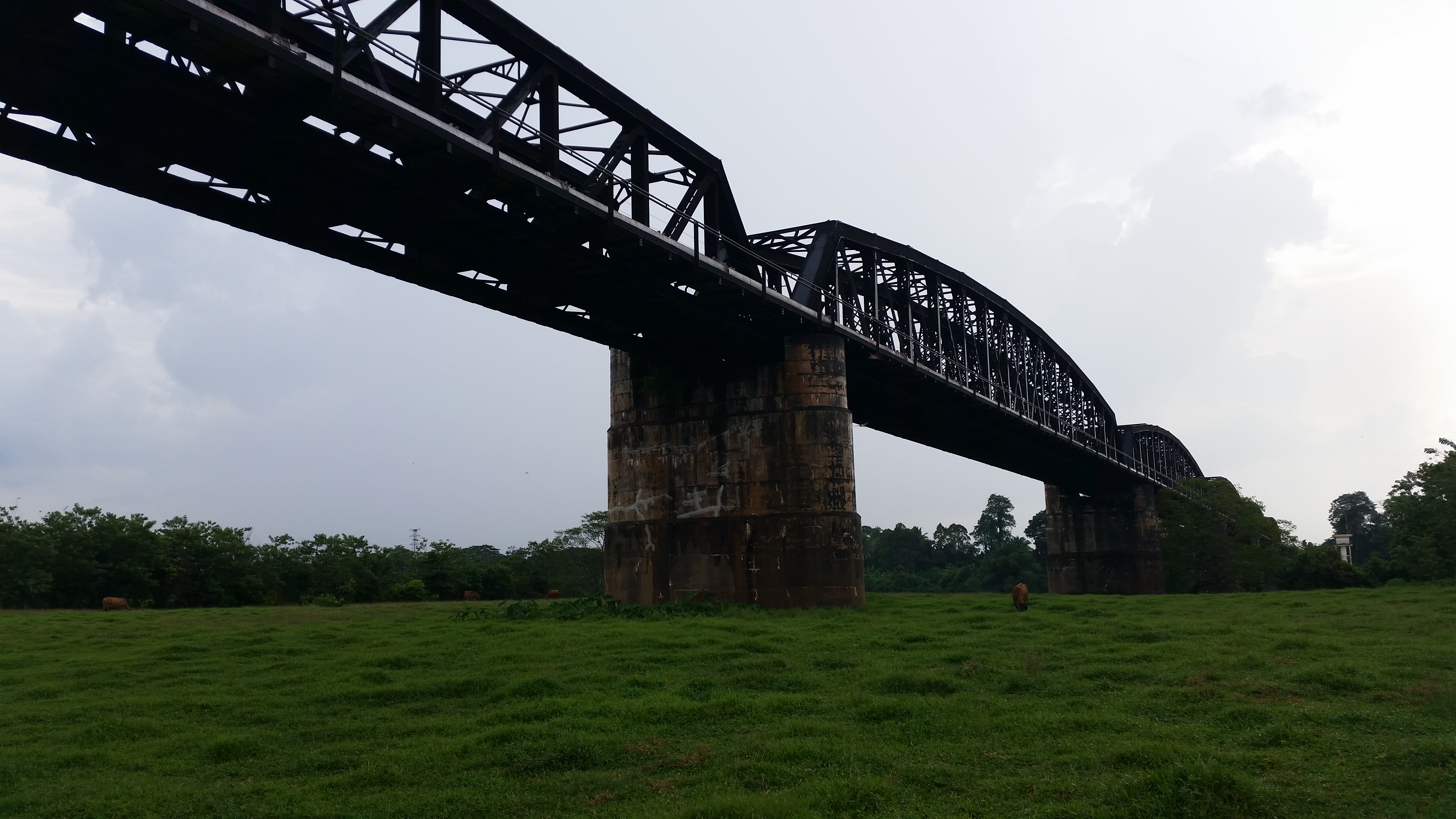
- Coordinates: 5°45′43″N 102°08′59″E
- Carries: Railway; Pedestrian
- Crosses: Kelantan River
- Locale: Tumpat-Gemas Line (East Coast Line)
- Official name: Guillemard Railway Bridge
- Maintained by: Railway Assets Corporation (RAC)

Characteristics
- Design: Double-intersection Warren truss bridge
- Total length: 660.2 m (2166 feet)

History
- Constructed by: Federated Malay States Railways (FMSR) Construction Division
- Opened: 19 July 1924; 100 years ago

The Guillemard Bridge (Malay: Jambatan Guillemard Jawi: جمبتن ڬويلليمارد) is a single track railway truss bridge located in Kusial, Tanah Merah District, Kelantan, Malaysia. It is the second-oldest railway bridge in the country after Victoria Bridge in Perak, although unlike Victoria Bridge, this bridge is still in use today.

== Etymology ==
The bridge was named after the British Governor for the Straits Settlements, Sir Laurence Guillemard.

== History ==
The construction of the Guillemard Bridge as the first crossing over the Kelantan River was initially planned to begin as early as 1915 upon the completion of the 54 km line between Tumpat and Tanah Merah in May 1914. However, due to the breakout of World War I, work was not commenced until 1920. Construction eventually began and was carried out between April 1920 and July 1924 by the Federated Malay States Railways (FMSR) Construction Division, using steel truss structures manufactured by The Metro Carriage Wagon & Finance Co of Wednesbury, England. Much of the material from the West was brought in via the Penang Port and brought all the way to Kelantan by rail transport through Thailand (Butterworth - Hat Yai - Sungai Golok) before ending at the site by way of the already existing Sungai Golok - Pasir Mas and Tumpat - Tanah Merah lines. It was reported that Chinese laborers were hired for the structural works while Indian workers were tasked with the earthworks, under British engineers' supervision. The construction started from the south side, Paloh Rawa (Machang) before completing at the Kusial (Tanah Merah) end.

The bridge was officially opened on Saturday, 19 July 1924 by the British High Commissioner for The Federated Malay States and Governor of the Straits Settlements, Sir Laurence Guillemard at the behest of Almarhum Sultan Ismail ibni Almarhum Sultan Muhammad IV of Kelantan. The Sultan was also present at the opening ceremony held on the north abutment at Kusial Bharu (Tanah Merah), alongside the Raja Kelantan (Crown Prince) Tengku Ibrahim ibni Almarhum Sultan Muhammad IV, who would later become Sultan Ibrahim ibni Almarhum Sultan Muhammad IV (1944~1960) of Kelantan. The Guillemard Bridge was opened less than a month after the opening of Johor Causeway (Tambak Johor) on 28 June 1924, which had also been officiated by Sir Laurence Guillemard.

In December 1941, at the start of the World War II in Malaya, the British forces retreating south to Kuala Krai, destroyed the north span of the bridge to prevent the Imperial Japanese Army advancing. It remained impassable to traffic until it was reconstructed and reopened to traffic on 7 September 1948.

The 660.2 m (2166 feet) bridge was the first bridge over the Kelantan River and was the sole such bridge from 1924 to 1965. In 1965 the Sultan Yahya Petra Bridge was completed and became the second link, connecting Kota Bharu and Tumpat. It was also the only railway bridge in Malaysia that served all land vehicles apart from train service from 1924 up until 1988 when the Tanah Merah (Kusial) Bridge was completed along Federal Route 4, just a few kilometers downstream. Guillemard Bridge was later closed to other traffic, and is limited only to train use as of 2024.

Kelantan Crown Prince Tengku Muhammad Fakhry Petra graced the 100th Anniversary of the Guillemard Railway Bridge in conjunction with Sultan Muhammad V's 55th birthday celebrations on Saturday, 21 September 2024.

As of 2024, Guillemard Bridge is the largest, longest and oldest steel truss railway bridge still in active rail operation in the country. It is the second longest railway bridge in Malaysia after the Bukit Merah Lake Railway Bridge in Perak, Malaysia.

== See also ==
- Transport in Malaysia
- Victoria Bridge, another colonial railway bridge in Malaysia
