= Communism in Malaysia =

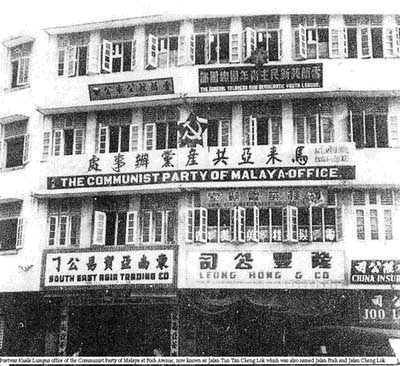
Headquarters of the Communist Party of Malaya in Peel Avenue (today Jalan Tun Tan Cheng Lock), Kuala Lumpur, 1948.

Communism in Malaysia has existed since the 20th century. The political philosophy was first brought to British occupied Malaya by Chinese anarchists in 1919. Soon after, Chinese communists began organizing fellow Chinese immigrants in earnest through classes, publications, and labor organizing. Communism continued to spread in the following decades, coming to a head in the midst of the Cold War. Communism was a major force during the Malayan Emergency as the Malayan National Liberation Army fought to establish independence from the British Empire. The state of emergency was lifted in 1960, followed by a subsequent insurgency between 1968 and 1989. Ultimately, communism was suppressed by the government, and failed to take root in the country.

In the post-colonial era, the Malaysian government has censored media it deems to be communist. Communists have often been portrayed as villains in media and education, with racial elements typically associated with ethnically Chinese Malaysians. The taboo against dissident political engagement in Malaysia that exists today, particularly among ethnic Chinese communities, can be attributed to the longstanding impact of the communist movement and its counter insurgency in this region.

== See also ==
- Malayan Communist Party
- Communist insurgency in Sarawak
- Malayan emergency
- Anarchism in Malaysia
