= May Day anti-GST rally 2015 =

The May Day Anti-GST Rally (Theme: "GST: Protest Till It's Dropped") was a rally held in Kuala Lumpur, Malaysia on May 1, 2015. The rally was organised by a coalition of non-governmental organisations, including Oppressed People's Network, Parti Sosialis Malaysia, Solidariti Anak Muda Malaysia, and Asalkan Bukan UMNO among others, and was supported by the opposition Pakatan Rakyat. The rally, which coincided with International Workers' Day, was held in response to the Malaysian government's rollout of the goods and services tax from April 1, 2015. The rally saw participants march from various points in Kuala Lumpur to their eventual destination, Kuala Lumpur City Centre.

== Rally ==
About 20,000 of protestors began gathering around Jamek Mosque and the National Mosque and started heading to Kuala Lumpur City Centre. Hundreds of protestors were wearing red "Batal GST" (Cancel GST) and KitaLawan (Our struggle) shirts.

It was reported during the rally there were youth agitators who were found to be letting off smoke bombs, burning rubbish and spray-painting graffiti on signboards and metal hoardings.

== Other rallies ==
Other rallies were held in Penang and Sabah, where the turnout was around few thousands and a few hundred respectively.

== Arrests ==
Opposition leaders Anthony Loke, Rafizi Ramli, Tian Chua were arrested for their involvement in the rally. Non-government organisation leaders such as Ambiga Sreenevasan and Hishamuddin Rais were also arrested. In total 59 people were arrested by the police for their involvement in the rally. The arrests were condemned by election watchdog Bersih, Human Rights Watch and Human Rights Commission of Malaysia.
