= Anarchism in Singapore =

There is a brief history of anarchism in Singapore. In contemporary times, there has been little or no significant presence of the ideology in the country.

== History ==
While the area which is now Singapore was inhabited for centuries prior to the arrival of European colonialists, the founding of modern Singapore took place in 1819. Founded by the British statesman Stamford Raffles, Singapore – as a colony of Britain – saw the Chinese become its largest ethnic group already in 1827. This trend has continued until today, with the Chinese Singaporeans making up approximately 74.1% of the population.

The Chinese population, much of which came to Singapore due to political or economic reasons – such as migrants leaving southern China to escape economic hardships, and refugees from the First Opium War (1839–1842) and Second Opium War (1856–1860) – has historically been a driving force behind radical political ideologies in the country. During the anti-Manchu upheavals of the late 19th and early 20th century in China, Chinese anarchists played an influential part opposing and eventually overthrowing the Qing Dynasty. Singapore played an important role in this process, serving as a center for Chinese revolutionary activity. In 1906 it became the headquarters of the Tongmenghui, a left-wing nationalist group, in Southeast Asia.

The branch was led by Sun Yat-sen, who would become a leader of the Revolution of 1911 and the early Republic of China. But political activity in Singapore was not limited to republican revolution. During this period, Sun was associated with the Chinese anarchist Zhang Renjie, who provided a significant amount of Sun's funding (Zhang's daughter Helen would later marry a doctor from Singapore, Robert Lim). Zhang, a member of the so-called Paris group who was active in the colony, purchased a printing press to be used in producing anarchist texts. Another member of the Paris anarchist group, Chu Minyi, joined the Tongmenghui while stopping over in Singapore. Years later, in the wake of the May Fourth Movement of 1919, anarchist groups were formed among overseas Chinese communities, in among other places Singapore. These radical societies published their own newsletters and periodicals and spread anarchist literature. Some republican–influenced anarchists joined the General Labour Union of Guangzhou, which had formed in Singapore.

In the modern period, political radicalism of all forms in Singapore has been far less common than in the past, especially for the political ideology of anarchism. Some rare anarchist-related instances have occurred, such as in May 2014 when five Singaporean teenagers were arrested for spraying crude anarchist symbolism and anti-People's Action Party slogans on a high-rise roof.

== In fiction ==
In Singaporean fiction, the plot of a 2003 six-part drama series produced by the now defunct SPH MediaWorks Channel U, entitled The Frontline (家在前线), circled around how the country coped after the German mastermind of a "neo-anarchist" organisation sets off a bomb at a naval base as an anti-imperialist statement against Singapore's ties with the United States.

== See also ==
- List of anarchist movements by region
- Anarchism in China
- Anarchism in Indonesia
- Anarchism in Malaysia
