= Dirk Lodewijk Willem van Mierop =

Dutch author and anarchist (1876–1930)

Lodewijk van Mierop
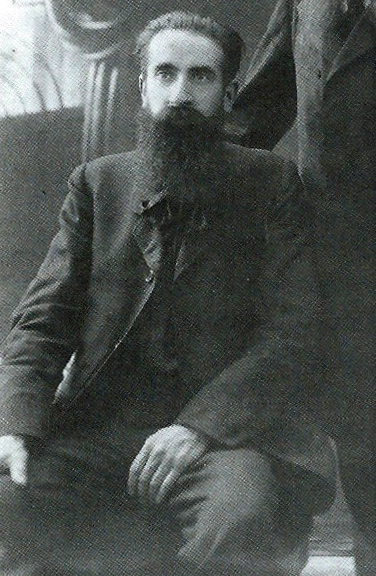
- Lodewijk van Mierop in 1906
- Born: Dirk Lodewijk Willem van Mierop; January 1, 1876; Rotterdam, Netherlands
- Died: June 13, 1930 (aged 54); Bussum, Netherlands
- Occupation: Author
- Known for: Christian anarchism

Dirk Lodewijk Willem van Mierop (January 1, 1876 – June 13, 1930), was a Dutch author, anti-militarist, magazine editor, activist, organizer, pacifist and Christian anarchist. Together with Felix Ortt, van Mierop was one of the most influential Christian anarchists in the Netherlands.

== Biography ==
Van Mierop grew up in a wealthy family. His father, Lodewijk Regnerus Constantijn Gertrudes van Mierop, was a timber merchant. His mother, Justine Marie Pauline van Lelyveld, convinced him to study theology. As a teenager, he was convinced by his mother's interest in socially-oriented Christianity, becoming a supporter of Christian anarchism. In addition to theology in Amsterdam, he also studied mathematics and natural history in Leiden. Through other theology students he got to know the works of Leo Tolstoy.

In October 1899 he founded the Association of the International Brotherhood, (VIB) in Blaricum, which was to live according to the ideals of Christian anarchism. Together with G.F. Lindeijer he was editor of the VIB magazine Arbeiders-Weekblad. The VIB initially consisted of around 20 members, including a baker, a tobacco dealer, workers from various professions and a pastor as well as their wives and children. In 1903 the VIB showed solidarity with the railway strike that took place there.

In 1903 there was a conflict with the neighboring population. They broke into the grounds of the "spinach eaters" and "red grass eaters" (meaning the vegetarians), and arson broke out. Some members of the VIB wanted to defend themselves with weapons, but van Mierop and Felix Ortt rejected the violent resistance. That was the end of the VIB. Felix Ortt described the downfall of the "Union of the International Brotherhood" in his novel Felicia (1905).

Van Mierop moved to Amersfoort in 1903 and founded the magazine Tegen Leugen en Geweld. After the end of the VIB he made contact with the Christian-anarchist group Nieuwe Niedorp, where he was on the board until 1909.

From 1907 to 1925, van Mierop was chairman of the Het Ingekeerde Leven Foundation, which he founded. The foundation published religious writings and made books available on loan. Together with his wife, Geertruida van Mierop-Mulder, he established the Engendaalsschool in 1912, a school based on humanitarian principles. The school management had to meet strict requirements: to be non-smokers, anti-militarists and abstainers. The name was changed to Stichting van der Huchtschool in 1929. In the same year Felix Ortt founded the Foundation for the Preservation of the Van der Huchtschool.

In 1920, Clara Gertrud Wichmann, van Mierop and others founded the Association of Religious Anarcho-Communists (BRAC), which promoted non-violence. Together with Kees Boeke and C.G. Wichmann, van Mierop was member of the Committee of Action Against Existing Views of Crimes and Punishment. In the avant-garde magazine i10, van Mierop published a series of articles.

== Works ==
- Met of zonder staatshulp? Het voor en tegen van wettelijke bepalingen, in zake drankbestrijding, wat nader beschouwd. Een woord tot alle drankbestrijders. Dordrecht 1898.
- Hoe is onze houding tegenover oorlog en militarisme?. Den Haag 1899.
- Weg met het militarisme!, Den Haag 1899.
- Dwepers! Een beschouwing over Tolstoy en zijn geestverwanten. Den Haag 1901.
- Algemene werkstaking. Blaricum (ohne Jahresangabe)
- Mijn aanklacht. Een moordaanslag van staatswege. Amersfoort 1903.
- Wanneer is geslachtsgemeenschap geoorloofd?, Amersfoort 1904.
- De slavernij der vrouw. Den Haag 1907.
- Waarom het 'vrije huwelik' zin heeft in onze tegenwoordige maatschappij. Amsterdam 1910.
- De rein leven-beweging in haar beginsel en arbeid geschetst. 1913.
- Het recht der persoonlike vrijheid tegenover de staatsmacht. Rotterdam 1916.
- Dienstweigering uit beginsel geen strafbaar feit. Soest 1916.
- Een vertrouwelik woord tot jonge mannen aankomende jongens over een geheime gewoonte. 1922.
- Wij eisen vrijlating van onschuldig veroordeelden. 1905.
- Zusammen mit Felix Ortt: Des Christens standpunt tegenover het maatschappelijk leven. Soest 1912.

== See also ==
- Anarchism in the Netherlands
