= Jiang Kanghu =

Chinese politician

- 江亢虎
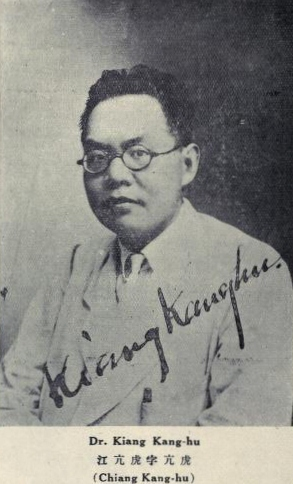
- Born: July 18, 1883; Yiyang, Jiangxi, China
- Died: December 7, 1954 (aged 71); Shanghai, China
- Occupation: Politician

Jiang Kanghu (Chinese: 江亢虎; pinyin: Jiāng Kànghǔ; Wade–Giles: Chiang K'ang-hu; Hepburn: Kō Kōko), who preferred to be known in English as Kiang Kang-hu, (July 18, 1883 – December 7, 1954), was a politician and activist in the Republic of China. His former name was "Shaoquan" (紹銓) and he also wrote under the name "Hsü An-ch'eng" (許安誠).

Jiang was initially attracted by the doctrines of anarchism and organized the Socialist Party of China, the first anarchist-socialist party in China, which existed from 1911 to 1913. As his politics became more conservative, he founded Southern University in Shanghai, taught at University of California, Berkeley, and became chair of the Department of Chinese Studies at McGill University in Canada. During the Second Sino-Japanese War he joined the Japanese-sponsored Reorganized National Government of China. He was arrested as a traitor following the war, and died in a Shanghai jail in 1954.

== Biography ==
=== Early life ===
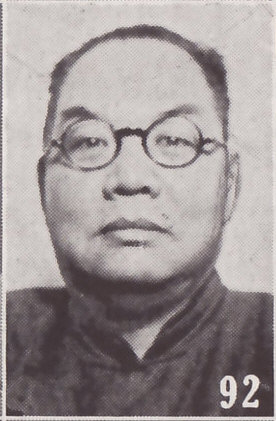
Jiang Kanghu as pictured in The Most Recent Biographies of Chinese Dignitaries

He was born in Yiyang, Jiangxi, China. Jiang, whose reading abilities included Japanese, English, French, and German, learned and began to develop a passion for socialism and anarchism while studying and traveling in Europe and Japan. In 1909 he attended the congress of the Second International in Brussels. On his return to China, he served as educational adviser to Yuan Shikai.

=== Early political and literary activities ===
Jiang served briefly as a professor at Peking University, but was ousted from that position on the grounds of his ideological radicalism. In August 1911, shortly after losing his post at Peking University, Jiang Kanghu established the Association for Socialism, and in November renamed it the Socialist Party of China.

While teaching at Berkeley, Jiang met a fellow faculty member, Witter Bynner, and the two struck up a long lasting friendship based on their love of poetry. Bynner later recalled him as a "gentle scholar" and a "man of principle and brave action." Jiang's off-handed quotations from Chinese literature and poetry led to a collaboration on a translation of the canonical anthology, Three Hundred Tang Poems. Jiang supplied word by word literal translations, then Bynner wrote poems in English which achieved a remarkable balance of faithfulness and literary quality. The volume was published as The Jade Mountain (New York: Knopf, 1928), which has remained constantly in print.

Throughout his life, Jiang continued to promote his views through his personal contacts, through his academic work, and through his writing. When he no longer found the doctrines of anarchism persuasive, he conducted an extensive public debate with anarchist intellectuals such as Liu Shifu which clarified their points of difference. His views influenced contemporary Chinese who later became major political figures in China. After he became estranged from them, Chinese anarchists accused Jiang of being "hopelessly confused." This confusion was not apparent to Mao Zedong, who later stated that, as a student, Jiang's writings had been a major influence on the development of his own political, social, and economic theories.

=== Academic career ===
Through his views, Jiang came to be known as a "Socialistic Confucian". Jiang attempted to provide a traditional sanction for nationalizing agriculture by arguing that in antiquity there had existed an agrarian socialist utopia built around the well-field system that vanished after the Qin dynasty abolished the public ownership of land (which Jiang identified with contemporary practices of land tenureship). Jiang promoted the abolition of private property, a model of rapid industrialization led by the state, as much local self-government as possible, the establishment of universal public schooling, and the advancement of women's rights.

In 1922, Jiang visited Taiyuan, Shanxi, three times, with the intention of convincing the local warlord, Yan Xishan, of the need to carry out political, social, and economic reforms in Shanxi. Although Jiang ultimately failed to convince Yan to follow Jiang's suggestions for reform at that time, Jiang's ideas left a great and lasting impression on Yan. Over the next two decades, Yan would adopt ideas and methods that were very similar to those proposed by Jiang. Particular ideas that Yan may have borrowed from Jiang include the glorification of the village, a dislike for the money economy, a belief that the state must take over responsibilities previously held by the family, his hatred of "parasites" (mostly landlords and money-lenders), and the belief that practice (i.e. manual labour) is an inseparable component of learning.

As American philanthropist Guion Gest located his personal 110,000-volume classical Chinese library collection to Montreal in 1926, McGill University appointed Jiang as Canada's first Professor of Chinese Studies in 1930. During his three-year tenure at McGill, Jiang gained international notoriety through attacking Pearl Buck's The Good Earth in the pages of the Chinese Christian Student. Jiang wrote that although peasants, coolies, and other humble persons constituted the vast majority of the Chinese population, they were "certainly not representative of the Chinese people." In 1933, Jiang returned to China and devoted himself to promoting socialism and traditional Chinese culture. In 1935, Jiang again visited Taiyuan, after Yan Xishan announced plans to implement a system of land reform in Shanxi. Jiang's impression of Yan at this time was so great that Jiang wrote an article lavishing praise on Yan, calling the warlord a "practical rather than a theoretical socialist."

=== Collaboration with Wang Jingwei ===
After the Second Sino-Japanese War broke out, Jiang escaped to Hong Kong. In 1939 he was invited by Wang Jingwei to take a position in Wang's Reorganized National Government of China based in Nanjing. Jiang accepted Wang's offer and traveled to Shanghai, where he wrote "The Shuangshijie Declaration about this Situation" (雙十節對時局宣言), asserting the establishment of a New East Asian Order. Jiang was appointed Chief of the Examination Yuan in March 1942, served as Minister of Personnel, and reopened the Southern University he had previously operated. Despite his position within the government, he remained critical of its policies, particularly on the issue of food supply.

== References and further reading ==
- "Jiang Kanghu," Ceng Yeying (曾业英), Institute of Modern History Chinese Academy of Social Sciences (1978). The Biographies of Republican Figures. Vol. 1. Zhonghua Book Company.
- Krebs, Edward S. (1998). Shifu, Soul of Chinese Anarchism. Lanham, Md.: Rowman & Littlefield. ISBN 0847690148.
- WorldCat Authority Page
- Boorman, Howard L., ed. (1967). "Chiang K'ang-hu". Biographical Dictionary of Republican China Volume I. New York: Columbia University Press. pp. 338–344. ISBN 0231089589.
