= May Day anti-GST rally 2014 =

Malaysian political protest

The May Day Anti-GST Rally (Theme: "GST: Protest Till It's Dropped") was a rally held in Kuala Lumpur, Malaysia on May 1, 2014. The rally was organised by a coalition of 89 non-governmental organisations, including Oppressed People's Network, Parti Sosialis Malaysia, Solidariti Anak Muda Malaysia, and Asalkan Bukan UMNO among others, and was supported by the opposition Pakatan Rakyat. The rally, which coincided with International Workers' Day, was held in response to the Malaysian government's plan to introduce the goods and services tax on April 1, 2015. The rally saw participants march from Kuala Lumpur City Centre and other rally points in the city to the eventual destination, Dataran Merdeka.

== Background ==
Since the last general elections, the Malaysian government began to renege on many of their election promises by raising the prices over a broad scope of cost of living items to arrest the high budget deficit. The Malaysian government then introduced legislation calling for the introduction of a 6% goods and services tax in 2015. The protest organisers also objected to the signing of the Trans-Pacific Partnership Agreement between Malaysia and the United States, and pushed for greater women's, indigenous peoples', students' and migrants' rights, as well as an increase in the minimum wage.

== Participants ==
The Anti-GST Rally was supported by as many as 89 non-governmental organisations and political groups, which are listed below in alphabetical order.

- Academy Of Tamil Studies
- Aliran
- Angkatan Warga Aman Malaysia (WargaAMAN)
- Asalkan Bukan UMNO
- Bantah Lynas
- Baramkini
- Bela Tani
- Bersih
- CAN
- Centre for Orang Asli Concerns
- Centre Of Education. Research And Development (Cedar)
- Child Development Initiative
- Community Development Centre (CDC)
- Council Of Temples Malaysia
- Damn the Dams
- DEMA
- Dignity International
- Empower
- FanTIZhi1748
- Federation of Malaysian Indian Organisation (PRIMA)
- Findars
- Food Not Bombs-Kuala Lumpur.
- Gabungan NGO Pengerang
- Gabungan Pekerja Sungai Petani (GABUNG)
- Gerakan Mahasiswa Maju New Era endorse
- Gerakan Mahasiswa Pantai Timur (GEMPUR)
- Gerakan Menuntut Pendidikan Percuma (GMPP)
- Group Of Concerned Citizens
- Himpunan Hijau
- Indian Malaysian Active Generation (Image)
- Jaringan Orang Asli Semenanjung Malaysia
- Jaringan Rakyat Tertindas (JERIT)
- Jawatankuasa Bertindak Flat Taman Permata Dengkil
- Jawatankuasa Kuala Lumpur Tak Nak Incinerator
- Jawatankuasa Pekerja Sanon Kogyo Malaysia Sdn Bhd
- Jawatankuasa Penduduk Jalan Reko Kajang
- Jawatankuasa Penduduk Kg Hakka
- Jawatankuasa Rakan Segari
- Jawatankuasa Tindakan Tanah Kampung Ampar Tenang
- Johor Yellow Flame (JYF)
- Kelab Bell Belia Selangor
- Kuala Lumpur and Selangor Chinese Assembly Hall Social-Economic Committee
- Klang Consumer Association
- KLCAH Youth
- Kongres Kesatuan Sekerja Malaysia (MTUC)
- Kuala Lumpur Hindu Youth Organisation
- Kumpulan Aktivis Sahabat Alam
- LLG Cultural Development Centre
- Lostgens
- MADPET (Malaysia Against Death Penalty and Torture)
- Majlis Kelab Bell Belia Tamil Malaysia
- Malaysia Tamil Artiste Association
- Malaysian Dravidian Association
- Malaysian Election Observers Network
- Malaysian Indian Historical Association
- Malaysian Indian Youth Development Foundation
- Malaysian Indians Progressive Association (MIPAS)
- Malaysian Trades Union Congress
- Malaysian Youth Care Association (PRIHATIN)
- Malaysians for Beng Hock
- Mamas Bersih
- Nationwide Human Development And Research Centre
- Northern Green Youth (NGY)
- Parti Rakyat Malaysia (PRM)
- Parti Sosialis Malaysia (PSM)
- Pax Romana ICMICA
- Pemuda Sosialis
- People’s Green Coalition
- PERMAS
- Persahabatan Semparuthi
- Persahabatan Semparuthi Johor
- Persatuan Alumni PBTUSM Selangor & KL
- Persatuan Alumni PBTUSM Utara
- Persatuan Kebangsaan Pelajar Islam Malaysia (PKPIM)
- Persatuan Komuniti Prihatin Selangor and KL (PRIHATIN)
- Persatuan Prihatin Belia Malaysia
- Pusat Komas
- Rakan Mantin
- Rudra Devi Samaj Malaysia
- Sahabat Rakyat Working Committee
- Sahabat Wanita
- Saya Anak Bangsa Malaysia (SABM)
- School of Acting Justly, Loving Tenderly, Treading Humbly (SALT), Malaysia
- Selangor Hokkien Association Youth Section
- Sembang-sembang Forum
- Serdang Bharu School Alumni Youth Section
- Sisters in Islam
- Solidariti Anak Muda Malaysia (SAMM)
- SUARAM
- Taskforce Against Kaiduan Dam (TAKAD)
- Tenaganita
- Transformasi Mahasiswa, UUM
- University Malaya Association of New Youth (UMANY)
- Women’s Aid Organisation (WAO)
- Women’s Centre for Change Penang (WCC)
- World Tamil Federation – Malaysian Chapter
- Opposition coalition, Pakatan Rakyat (consisting of People's Justice Party, Democratic Action Party and Pan-Malaysian Islamic Party)

The rally was monitored by the Bar Council and Suhakam.

== 1 May 2014 Declaration ==
The following Declaration (1 May 2014 Declaration) was read prior to the start of the rally.

"2014 is the year of protesting the GST, or the goods and services tax. The Barisan Nasional government has passed the GST Act despite the repeated objections of the rakyat to its implementation.

In Malaysia, only 15% of the rakyat are able to pay income tax, with over 38% of the population falling beneath the poverty line income of RM860 per month, and the implementation of the minimum wage of RM900 still being far from comprehensive.

Moreover, according to the Governor of Bank Negara, Tan Sri Dr Zeti Akhtar Aziz, household debt in Malaysia is 83% of GDP—the highest in Asia—compared to Singapore at 67%, and Hong Kong at 58%. Given this dire situation, how will the rakyat fare if GST is implemented?

The GST will cause the price of all goods and services to increase, despite the Government’s justification that there are 40 essential items which will not be subject to price hikes. This is because every product will undergo processes of production or preparation before reaching the consumer—all of which are taxable under GST. Even if indirectly, this will result in consumers paying more for goods and services in the long run.

The rakyat of Malaysia, especially the workers who represent the 99%, will doubtless suffer as a result of GST, regardless of the Government’s spurious claims of its implementation being good for the country. The same pro-corporate Government that was able to reduce income tax from 40% in the 1980s to 26% today is now ready and willing to jeopardise the welfare of the rakyat with the burden of GST."

Additionally, a list of 15 demands were also read out at the beginning of the rally, which pertain to GST, the Trans Pacific Partnership Agreement (TPPA), minimum wage policy, workers' union rights, women workers' rights, migrant workers' rights, privatisation of public services, media freedom, price of goods, students' rights, Orang Asal rights, environmental protection, affordable housing, and oppressive laws.

== Pre-rally incidents ==
The Malaysian police claimed they would declare the Anti-GST Rally as illegal as the organisers did not obtain the necessary permission to hold the rally at Dataran Merdeka, and added that the site was undergoing upgrading works on the day. The organisers insisted that the rally would be held regardless, informing the police they would not cause any problems. The police also advised the organisers to choose a different venue in the city, such as Stadium Merdeka or Padang Merbok.

Federal Territories Minister Tengku Adnan Tengku Mansor warned the protesters to stay clear of Dataran Merdeka, while Home Minister Datuk Seri Dr Ahmad Zahid Hamidi told the protest organisers to adhere to the stipulations of the Peaceful Assembly Act 2012. However, a ruling by the Appeals Court stated that any punishment given for failure to give notice to the authorities before a protest as stipulated in the Act was unconstitutional, meaning there should be no repercussions for any protesters taking part in the rally.

== Rally ==
It was estimated than between 15,000 and 50,000 people began gathering at several points in the city such as Kuala Lumpur City Centre, Sogo, Dataran Maybank and Jalan Raja Laut before proceeding to Dataran Merdeka. The gathering was largely peaceful with no untoward incidents initially. Speeches were given by a number of NGO representatives, such as Bersih's Maria Chin Abdullah and her predecessor Ambiga Sreenevasan, Opposition leader Anwar Ibrahim, and Mohamad Sabu were among Pakatan Rakyat leaders that give their political speech. Most of the speeches hit out against the introduction of GST, and its potentially disastrous effects on the poorer sections of the Malaysian population.

The president of Congress of Unions of Employees in the Public and Civil Services (Cuepacs) branded civil servants who took part in the rally as "traitors" who might lose their jobs as a result of their participation. Deputy Finance Minister Ahmad Maslan, meanwhile, termed the rally as inappropriate and that the introduction of GST would still proceed as planned.

=== Rally Incident ===
==== Clueless protestors ====
It was reported that a majority of the protesters were clueless on what they were protesting. A protester was noted to have said " I don't know what is GST. What I know is that it is a burden to the people.That's all I care, I don't care to know what is GST." The acronym for GST itself was wrongly interpreted as "Government Service Tax" rather that "Goods and Service Tax".

==== Attack on Media Personnel ====
A 100-strong group protesters which named themselves "Rejimen Anarki" and "Antifa" assaulted several media personnel on the scene. The group, which mostly wearing black attire, cursed, kicked and punched several media photographers on duty. A Malaysian Reserve photographer was also hurled with wooden stick. Some of their cameras were also broken. General Secretary of Association of Malaysian Media Photographers (MPPA) condemned the attack. This has prompted the Minister of Communication and Multimedia, Dato' Sri Ahmad Shabery Cheek to urged the public to respect the journalists' presence as they were merely doing their duty.

==== Hijacked by Pakatan Rakyat ====
An activist, Asiah Abd Jalil was deeply dampened when she alleged that the rally was being hijacked by Pakatan Rakyat even though the organisers were NGOs. She criticised Unit Amal PAS which forced the rally-goers to hear political speeches by their leaders and blocking access to Dataran Merdeka. She was also cynical, questioning whether Unit Amal PAS were the self-appointed "Demonstration Police". Protestors were also seen pushing through Unit Amal PAS in the rally.
