= Laurence Guillemard =

Colonial Administrator

His Excellency Sir Laurence Guillemard GCMG KCB
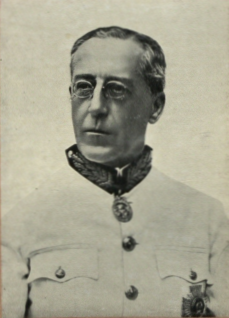

18th Governor of the Straits Settlements
- In office 17 February 1920 – 3 June 1927
- Monarch: George V
- Preceded by: Sir Arthur Young
- Succeeded by: Sir Hugh Clifford

Personal details
- Born: 7 June 1862 Dublin, Ireland
- Died: 13 December 1951 (aged 89) London, England
- Spouse: Lady Ella Guillemard (m. 1902; died 1940)
- Parent: Rev. William Guillemard (father)
- Education: Charterhouse School
- Alma mater: Trinity College, Cambridge
- Occupation: Colonial Administrator

Sir Laurence Nunns Guillemard GCMG KCB (7 June 1862 – 13 December 1951) was a British civil servant who served as the British Governor of the Straits Settlements and high commissioner in Malaya when it was under the British Empire.

== Early life ==
Guillemard was the only son of Rev. William Guillemard. He was educated at Charterhouse School and Trinity College, Cambridge.

== Career ==
Guillemard entered the civil service in 1886 and joined the Treasury in 1888 where he was a Private Secretary to both Chancellors of the Exchequer, Sir William Harcourt and Sir Michael Hicks Beach between 1892 and 1902. In May 1902, he was appointed Deputy-Chairman of the Board of Inland Revenue and Chairman of the Board of Customs in 1908.

He was appointed Governor of the Straits Settlements and High Commissioner for the Federated Malay States in 1920 and retired from the civil service in 1927. In 1925 he was the target of an assassination plot by anarchist Wong Sau Ying.

== Awards and honours ==
Guillemard was invested as a Companion of Order of the Bath (CB) in 1905, Knight Commander of the Order of the Bath (KCB) in 1910, and a Knight Commander of the Order of St Michael and St George (KCMG) in 1923. He was later awarded Knight Grand Cross of the Order of St Michael and St George (GCMG) in the 1927 New Year Honours.

== Personal life ==
In 1902 Guillemard married Ella Walker (1881-1940), the daughter of Thomas Spencer Walker. She predeceased him.

== Legacy ==
During his administration, Guillemard was criticised by opinion pieces in The Straits Times remarking on his lack of "bold initiative." Guillemard's attempts to decentralise more control over internal affairs to the Federated Malay States met with opposition, and some of his proposals were abandoned. Guillemard's obituary published in The Straits Times began by stating he was "not likely to be regarded by Malayan historians as a great Colonial Governor." However it went on to call him "a sound administrator, and the right man for Malaya at the end of the first world war," praising him for his decentralisation efforts, reforms expanding the number of local seats on the Straits Settlements Legislative Council, and his financial stewardship during the Great Depression.

The Guillemard Bridge in Kelantan and the Guillemard Reservoir in Penang are named after him. The road Jalan Tuanku Abdul Halim (formerly known as Jalan Duta) and its adjoining hill Bukit Ledang in Kuala Lumpur were both initially named for Guillemard. Guillemard Road in Singapore is also named after him.

Government offices
Preceded by Sir Thomas Pittar	Chairman of HM Customs; 1908–1909	Succeeded by himself as Chairman, Board of Customs and Excise
Preceded by himself as Chairman of the HM Customs	Chairman of Board of Customs and Excise; 1909–1919	Succeeded by Sir Horace Hamilton
Preceded by The Lord Chalmers as Chairman, Inland Revenue^{1}	Chairman of Board of Customs and Excise; 1909–1919	Succeeded by Sir Horace Hamilton
Preceded by Sir Arthur Young	Governor of the Straits Settlements and British High Commissioner in Malaya; 1920 – 1927	Succeeded by Sir Hugh Clifford
Notes and references
1. The excise functions were demerged from the Inland Revenue, but the latter otherwise remained a separate body.
