= Liu Shifu =

Chinese anarchist (1884–1915)

- 劉師復
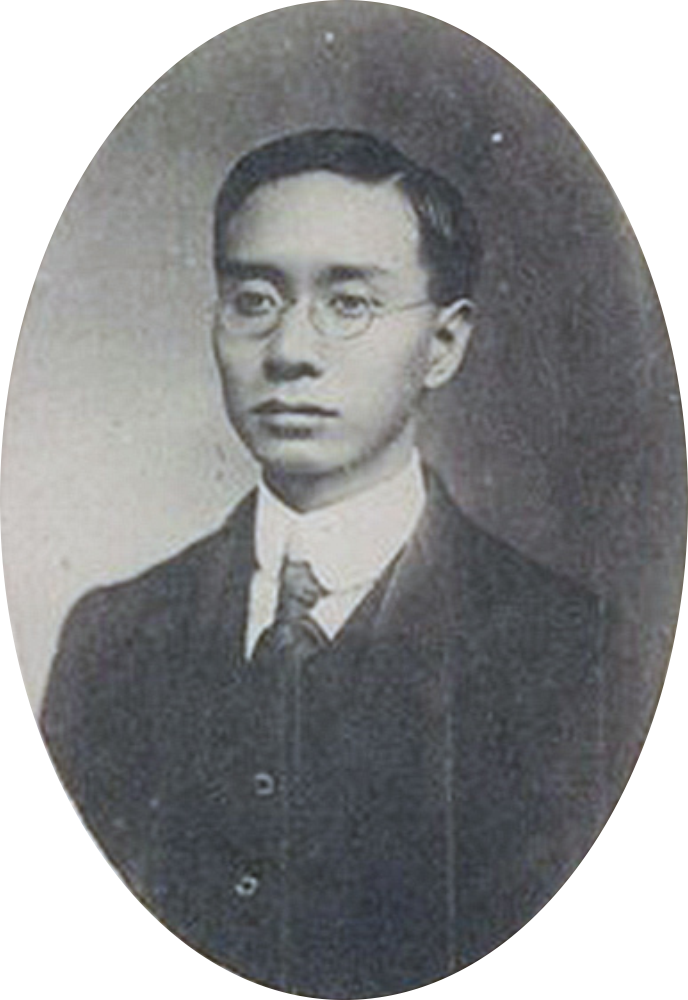
- Born: Liu Shaobin; June 27, 1884; Xiangshan County, Guangdong, China
- Died: March 27, 1915 (aged 30); Shanghai, China
- Other name: Sifo
- Occupations: Assassin, politician

Liu Shifu (Chinese: 劉師復; Wade–Giles: Liu Shih-fu; Jyutping: Lau Si Fuk; born Liu Shaobin; 27 June 1884 – 27 March 1915) also known as Sifu, was a Chinese assassin and politician. He was an Esperantist and an influential figure in the Chinese revolutionary movement in the early twentieth century, and in the Chinese anarchist movement in particular. He was a key figure in the movement, particularly in Guangdong province, and one of the most important organizers in the Chinese anarchist tradition. He is sometimes considered as the Pierre-Joseph Proudhon of China.

== Early years ==
Liu Shaobin was born on 27 June 1884, to a prosperous family in Xiangshan County, Guangdong. His father, Liu Biancheng was a local official and engaged in business ventures. Normally educated as a child while along with other teenagers being shocked by the result of the First Sino-Japanese War in that era, he earned the top place in the local examinations of Guangdong in 1898. The next year, Liu, due to his disappointment in Chinese politics, failed the provincial examination in Guangzhou on purpose, which greatly astonished his father. Liu disliked his formal education, and thought China needed to reform.

After failing the test, Liu undertook his first reform activities by helping a reading group to study books and magazines for the new knowledge and organizing a public speaking society. His cousin, Liu Yuehang joined him in these activities. They also set up a branch of their reading group in Macau, where Shifu met Zheng Guangong, one of the most radical Chinese thinkers in that era, and started a girls' school in Xiangshan. Alongside these reform activities Liu maintained a quest for knowledge to meet his country's needs, and for a viewpoint, some broader sense of how China ought to be transformed.

These thoughts on the reform of a country led him into fields for which he had little aptitude and little genuine interest, and he studied the fields of traditional mathematics equivalent to algebra and trigonometry. He also read widely in the works of the heterodox thinkers of the Hundred Schools of Thought.

In 1902, he traveled to Japan to pursue western studies. In Japan, he investigated radical politics and joined Sun Yat-Sen's Revolutionary Alliance. As a teenager, he changed his name to Liu Sifu (Sifu literally means "thinking of restoration of the Han people") for the first time.

== Later activities ==
Liu returned to China in 1906. After returning to China, Liu organized several revolutionary movements during late 1906 and early 1907. On the morning of 1 May 1907, Liu attempted to assassinate Li Zhun, the Guangdong naval commandant of Qing dynasty, but Liu failed and lost one hand in an accidental explosion. Liu was later arrested and jailed for about three years due to the failed assassination. In early 1910, after his release, Liu co-founded the China Assassination Corps with Xie Yingbo, Zhu Shutang and others. The China Assassination Corps was an anti-colonial movement which was strongly influenced by the tactics of the Russian nihilist movement and advocated revolutionary terrorism and the assassination of criminal elites (propaganda of the deed). Upon conversion to anarchism he denounced these tactics as counter-productive and switched his focus to grass-roots organizing among peasants and workers in order to build a revolutionary mass movement. He was one of the first Chinese Revolutionaries to seriously advocate Peasant organizing as a key element of his revolutionary strategy.

In 1912 Liu founded the Society of Cocks Crowing in the Dark (a.k.a. Cock-Crow Society, simplified Chinese: 晦鸣学社; traditional Chinese: 晦鳴學社), whose journal, People's Voice, was the leading organ of Chinese anarchism in the 1910s. Liu was a skilled expositor of anarchist doctrine and his polemical exchanges with the socialist leader Jiang Kanghu helped to popularize anarchism as a "pure socialism" and to distinguish it from other currents in socialist thought.

The Cock-Crow Society, also known as the "Guangzhou Group", is usually described as being "led" by Liu, and this is generally accurate insofar as we understand it as leadership by example since he was never granted any formal position or coercive authority by the group. Their most significant contributions at this stage were the foundation of "an alliance between intellectuals and workers" and their propaganda work which set out to differentiate anarchism from all the other socialisms that were gaining in popularity; and in so doing crystallized for the first time exactly what anarchism was. The Guangzhou group used positive assertions of rights and workers, women, peasants, and other oppressed groups to outline their vision of an anarchist society. Noticeably absent was any mention of Ethnic minorities, since a basic part of their platform was the elimination of ethnic, racial, and national identities in favor of an internationalist identity that placed primary importance on loyalty to humanity as a whole, instead of to one's ethnic or racial group.

It is important to recognize that this position was formulated in response to the primacy placed on ethnicity by the Anti-Manchu movement, which sought to assert the illegitimacy of the Qing dynasty based in part on the fact that its members were part of an ethnic minority out of touch with the Han majority, a position which Anarchists of all four major groups decried as racist and unbefitting a movement that claimed to be working for liberation. Their position, therefore, was that ethnicity-based organizing promoted racism, and had no place in a revolution that sought liberation for all of humanity.

He was very active in the movement for the international language Esperanto, in which he used the pseudonym Sifo.

== Sources ==
- Benton, Gregor (2007-05-23). Chinese Migrants and Internationalism: Forgotten Histories, 1917–1945. Routledge. ISBN 978-1-134-11330-9.
- Cairns, Daniel (2009a). "Shifu (1884–1915)". In Ness, I. (ed.). The International Encyclopedia of Revolution and Protest. John Wiley & Sons, Ltd. p. 1. doi:10.1002/9781405198073.wbierp1802. ISBN 9781405198073.
- Dirlik, Arif (1991). Anarchism in the Chinese Revolution. Berkeley: University of California Press. ISBN 978-0520072978. OCLC 1159798786.
- Krebs, Edward S. (1998). Shifu, Soul of Chinese Anarchism. Lanham, Md.: Rowman & Littlefield. ISBN 0847690148.
- Li, Guangyi (1981). "无政府主义在中国的传播及其破产" [The spread of anarchism in China and its impoverishment]. 史学月刊 [Monthly Historical Journal] (in Chinese (China)) (2): 74–80. ISSN 0583-0214.
- Wu, Yaqi (2015). "'师复主义'对马克思主义传播的影响" [The influence of 'Shifuism' on the spread of Marxism]. 郑州航空工业管理学院学报，社会科学版 [Journal of Zhengzhou Institute of Aviation Industry Management, Social Science Edition] (in Chinese (China)). 34 (6): 30–33. doi:10.19327/j.cnki.zuaxb.1009-1750.2015.06.007. ISSN 1009-1750.
