= Sino-International Library =

Sino-International Library, in Geneva (1932-1950) and Montevideo (1950-1993)

Bibliothèque Sino-Internationale
- 中國國際圖書館
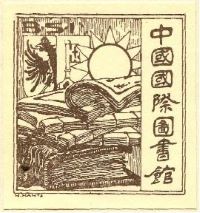
- Location: Geneva (Switzerland) - Montevideo (Uruguay)
- Type: Research library and cultural agency
- Established: 1932 in Geneva, Switzerland.
- Dissolved: 1993 in Montevideo, Uruguay

Other information
- Director: Hu Tianshi - Xiao Yu

The Sino-International Library (original name in French: Bibliothèque Sino-Internationale, or BSI; simplified Chinese: 中国国际图书馆; traditional Chinese: 中國國際圖書館) was a Chinese library and cultural agency active from 1932 to 1950 in Geneva, Switzerland, and from 1951 to 1993 in Montevideo, Uruguay.

The BSI aimed at bettering the knowledge of Chinese life and culture around the world. Its holdings included up to 200'000 volumes, as well as special materials such as paintings, calligraphies, photographs, children's drawings and artefacts such as costumes and musical instruments. The BSI organized many events, in Geneva, in other European cities, and later in Montevideo: art exhibitions, conferences, courses and film screenings. It published two periodicals: Orient et Occident (1934-1936) and La Chine Illustrée (China Illustrated, China Illustriert, 中國畫報 1935-1937) as well as various monographs.

In 1950, at the Foundation of the People's Republic of China, the BSI was integrally transported to Montevideo, and deposited at the Biblioteca Nacional de Uruguay. In 1993, the core of the Library, including all ancient Chinese books, was transported to Taipei and integrated into the collections of the National Central Library.

== Organization ==
Formally a private association, the BSI was funded by individuals forming a Committee of founding members (French: Comité des Membres Fondateurs) whose seat was in Geneva, and whose statutes were established under Swiss law. The institution was recognized and subsidized by the Nanjing Government, by decision of the Executive Yuan.

The BSI Committee intersected widely with the Chinese National Commission of the International Committee on Intellectual Cooperation (Chinese: 國際文化合作中國聯盟) of the League of Nations. The Committee leading members were Li Shizeng, Zhang Renjie, Wu Zhihui and Cai Yuanpei, the cofounders in Paris in 1906-07 of the Che Kiai Cheu (World Society, Chinese: 世界社; pinyin: Shijie she).

Among members of the Committee were many significant personalities of Republican China, such as : Chiang Kai-Shek, Wang Jingwei, Hu Hanmin, Sun Fo, T.V. Soong, etc. Western members were Joseph Avenol, Édouard Herriot, Ludwig Rajchman and Eduard Von der Heydt.

The successive Directors of the BSI were Hu Tianshi and Xiao Zicheng.

== Places ==
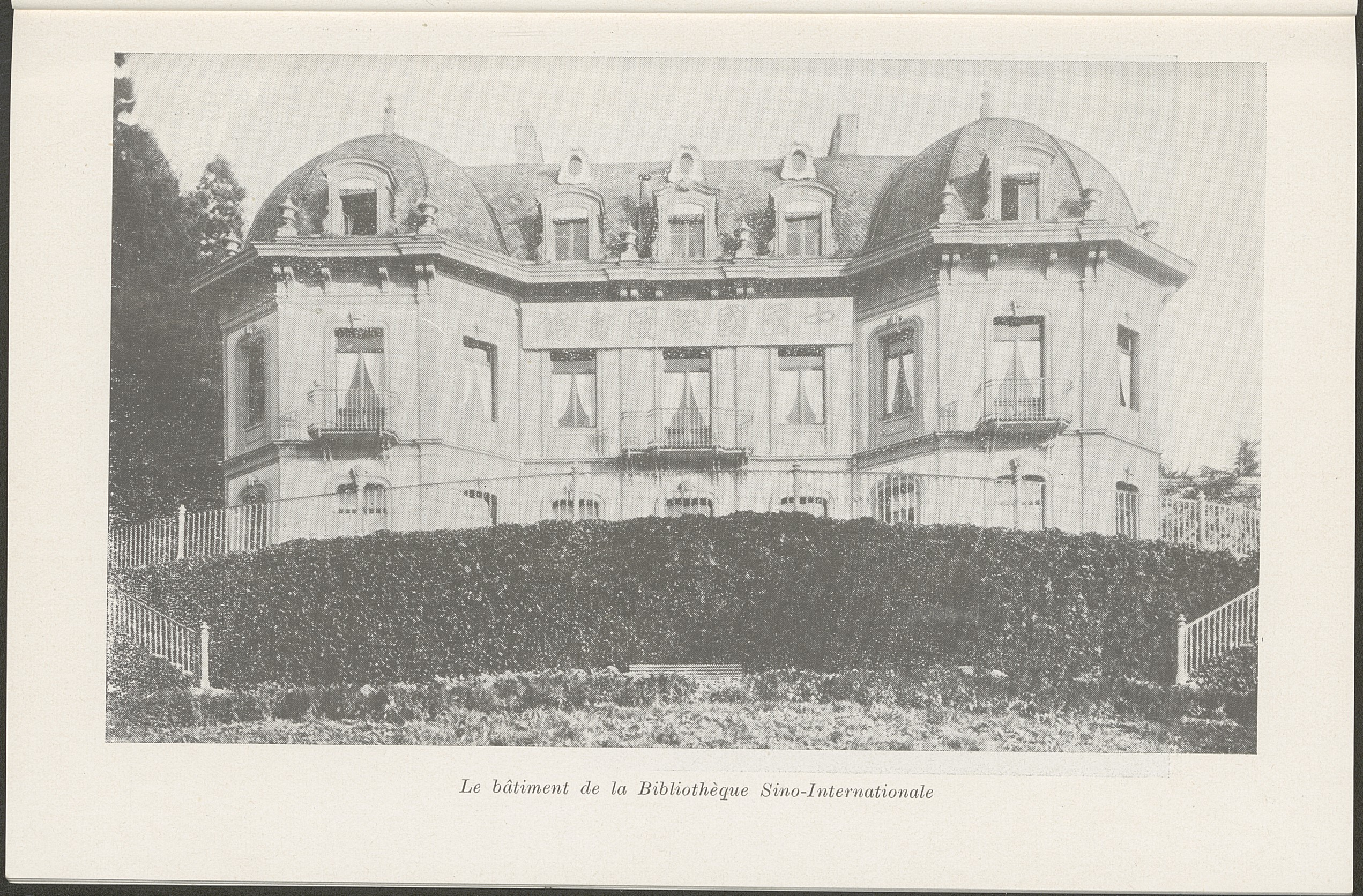
The BSI at the Château de Montalègre, 1936.

In Geneva, the BSI had three consecutive addresses: initially located in the city center, at 5, route de Florissant, it moved in September 1934 to the Château de Montalègre in the neighboring municipality of Cologny. In October 1937, it was moved again to the Pavillon du désarmement of the Palais Wilson.

A Shanghai branch (French:Section de Shanghai) of the BSI was situated at Route Fergusson 393 - now Wukanglu (Chinese: 武康路) 393, a property of the Che Kiai Cheu (World Society). Other branches were planned in Nice, Lyon, and New York, but seem to have never been fully implemented.

== Holdings ==
The holdings of the BSI were huge. According to a 1939 description it counted 125'000 Chinese books and manuscripts and 30'000 European books. Later inventories amount to 200'000 volumes.

Among the rarities were precious Chinese books from the Ming Dynasty, as well as an original of the 1725 Encyclopedia Complete Classics Collection of Ancient China (Chinese: 古今圖書集成) in 6'000 volumes. The special materials included ancient and modern Chinese paintings and calligraphies, a large set of children's drawings, up to 4000 photographs and many artefacts such as musical instruments.

== Events and visitors ==
Many events were organized by the BSI, such as a 1934 Exhibition of Chinese Art featuring 1000 items at the Geneva Kursaal, a 1935 exhibitions of children's drawings both in Geneva and at the Pestalozzianum in Zürich, the screening of films such as the 1931 Love and Duty - whose last existing copy was to be later found in the BSI holdings in Montevideo. Conferences were regularly given, e.g. on Chinese music by Xiao Shuxian or on Chinese feminism by Marcela de Juan. Many prominent people visited the BSI, such as the philosopher and diplomat Hu Shih, the opera performer Mei Lanfang, the actress Hu Die or the author Gao Changhong.

== The BSI in Montevideo ==
At the Proclamation of the People's Republic of China in 1949, Switzerland promptly recognized the new regime (January 17, 1950). According to his own narrative, Li Shizeng considered that the BSI was at risk to be seized by the PRC. Contacts were taken with the Uruguayan authorities through the meddling of Hugo Fernández Artucio, who contributed with Li Shizeng for the Free World magazine in New-York. The entire library, 350 boxes, were transported by train to Genoa and then by boat to Montevideo.

Archive documents left in Montevideo testify that the Library was in precarious financial situation. Its transportation from Geneva and its installation in Uruguay was financed by the Uruguayan Government. At first, the Library was left in boxes, it was then given an important space, inaugurated on April 3, 1967, in the new building (1965) of the Biblioteca Nacional de Uruguay.

In Montevideo, the BSI continued its action for cultural dissemination, organizing events such as a 1969 exhibition 3000 anos de arte Chino.

== Fate ==
In March 1993, a letter on behalf of the Che Kiai Cheu asked for the return of the BSI holdings. After negotiation, the core of the library, including all ancient Chinese books, was transported to Taiwan. The collections are now integrated into the National Central Library in Taipei. A few items, including some archive documents about the BSI, remain at the Special materials room of the Biblioteca Nacional de Uruguay.
