= Xin Shiji =

Chinese anarchist periodical

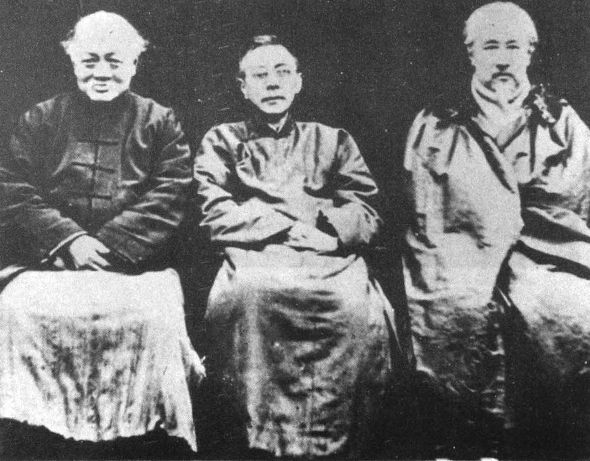
Wu Zhihui, Zhang Renjie and Li Shizeng in Paris.

Xin Shiji (Chinese: 新世紀, Esperanto: La Tempoj Novaj, French: Les Temps Nouveaux – later Nouveau Siècle), translated to English as both New Century and New Era, was a periodical published by the "Paris Group", a movement of radical Chinese intellectuals who subscribed to the ideology of anarchism. Unlike the contemporary "Tokyo Group", who focused more on indigenous Asian traditions, the Paris-based revolutionaries instead favoured more Western thought – such as anarcho-syndicalist and anarcho-communist tactics, the study of the constructed language Esperanto, and the works of thinkers like Mikhail Bakunin and Peter Kropotkin.

This was mirrored in the content of Xin Shiji, which began publication in June 1907. Founders and prominent contributors included Zhang Renjie, Li Shizeng, Chu Minyi, and Wu Zhihui. It would last for three years, until May 1910, through 121 issues, until it eventually disbanded due to funding issues. It was subtitled in French with inspiration from the fellow anarchist newspaper with which it shared a building, Les Temps Nouveaux published by Jean Grave. Articles featured included "On women's revenge" by He Zhen and "Revolution in the three constant relationship", both of them feminist tracts which rejected key tenets of Confucianism. Beyond publishing articles, the newspaper serialized long Chinese translations of texts by authors such as Bakunin, Kropotkin, Pierre-Joseph Proudhon, Élisée Reclus, and Errico Malatesta.

== See also ==
- Anarchism in China
- Chinese Assassination Corps
- Xinhai Revolution
