= Former Residence of Cai Yuanpei =

- 蔡元培故居
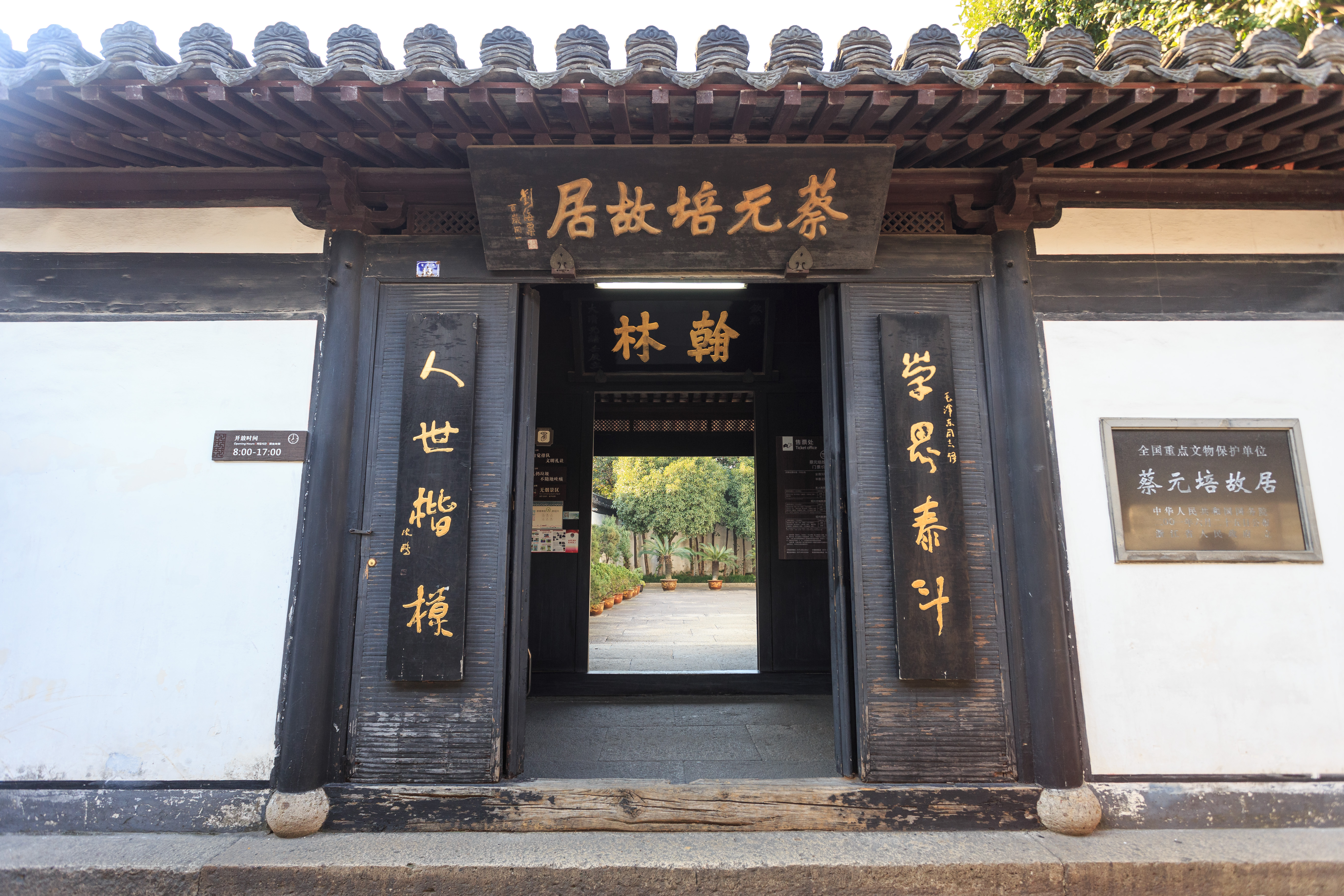
- Entrance.

- Location within Zhejiang

General information
- Type: Traditional folk houses
- Location: Yuecheng District, Shaoxing, Zhejiang, China
- Coordinates: 30°00′33.84″N 120°34′45.84″E
- Completed: Qing dynasty (1644–1911)
- Owner: Shaoxing Municipal Government

Height
- Architectural: Chinese architecture

Technical details
- Material: Bricks and wood
- Floor area: 1,004 m^{2} (10,810 sq ft)
- Grounds: 1,856 m^{2} (19,980 sq ft)

The Former Residence of Cai Yuanpei or Cai Yuanpei's Former Residence (Chinese: 蔡元培故居; pinyin: Cài Yuánpéi Gùjū) is the birthplace of Cai Yuanpei, a Chinese educator, esperantist, president of Peking University, and founder of the Academia Sinica.

== History ==
The former residence was originally built by Cai Jiamo (蔡嘉谟), the grandfather of Cai Yuanpei, in the reign of Daoguang Emperor (1821–1850) in the Qing dynasty (1644–1911).

On 11 January 1868, Cai Yuanpei was born here.

On 25 June 2011, it was listed among the fifth group of "State Cultural Protection Relics Units" by the State Council of China.

== Architecture ==
It has a building area of about 1,004-square-metre (10,810 sq ft), embodies buildings such as the main hall, the gate and the reception hall.

== Gallery ==
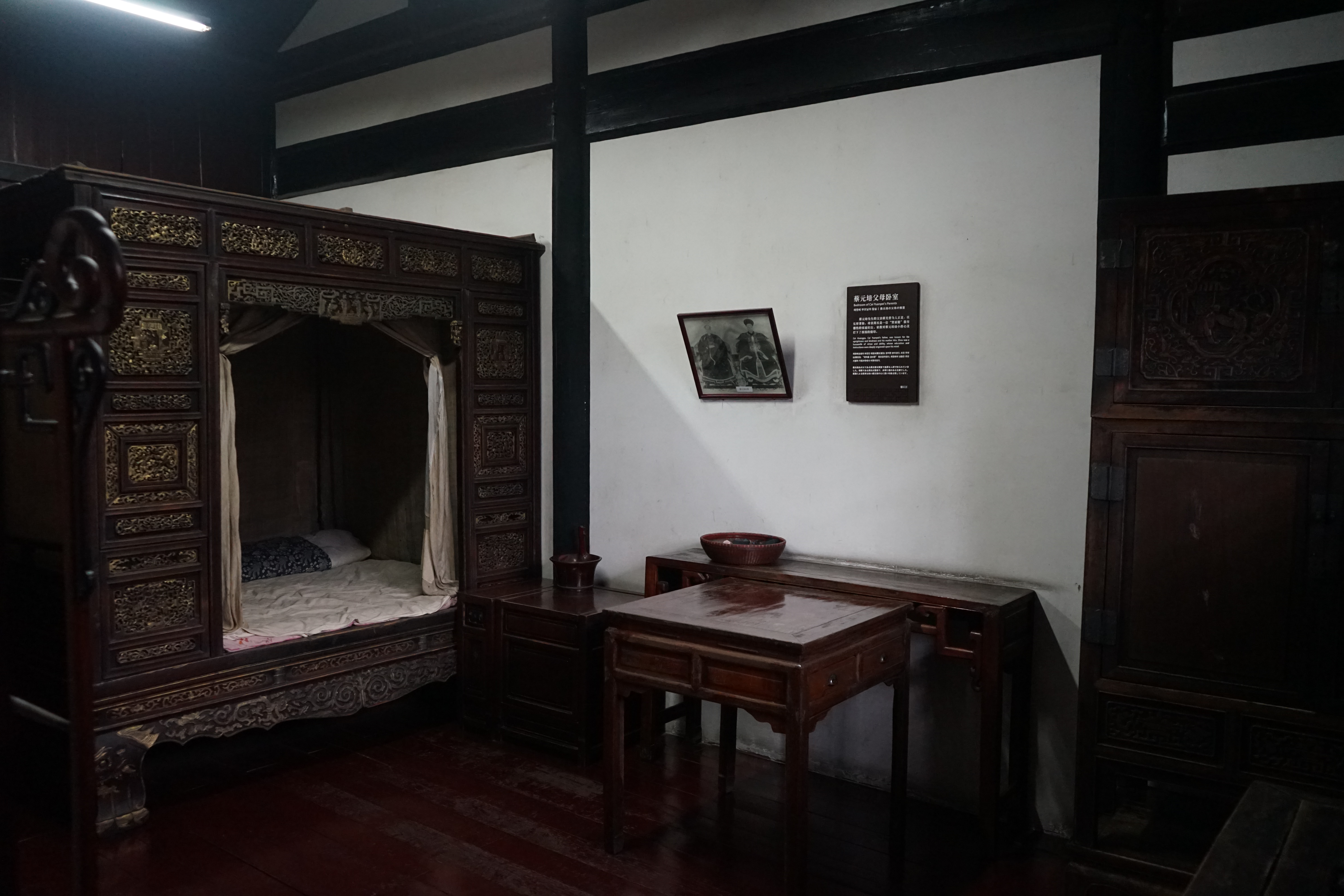
Bedroom of Cai Yuanpei's parents

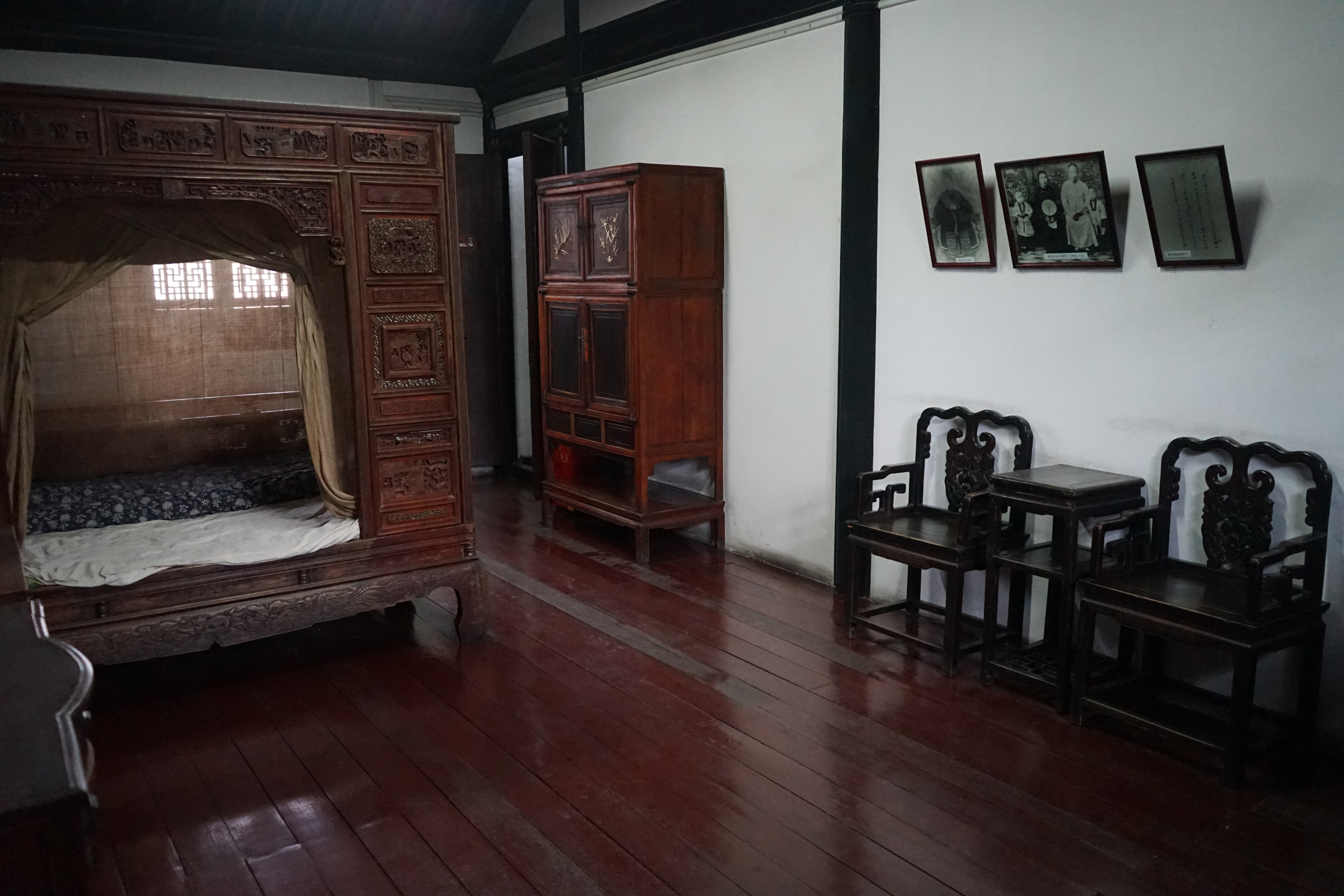
Cai Yuanpei's bedroom

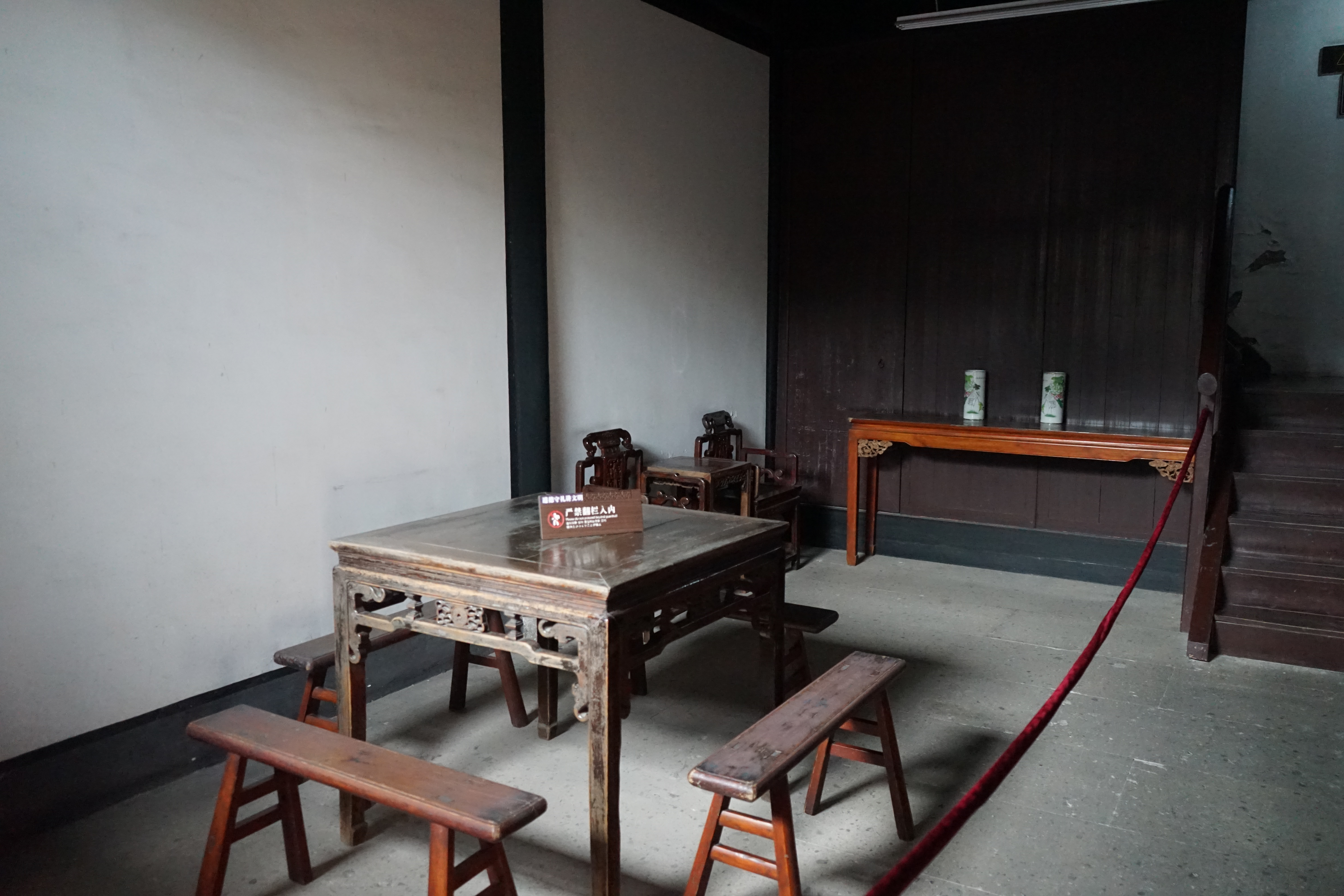
Dining room

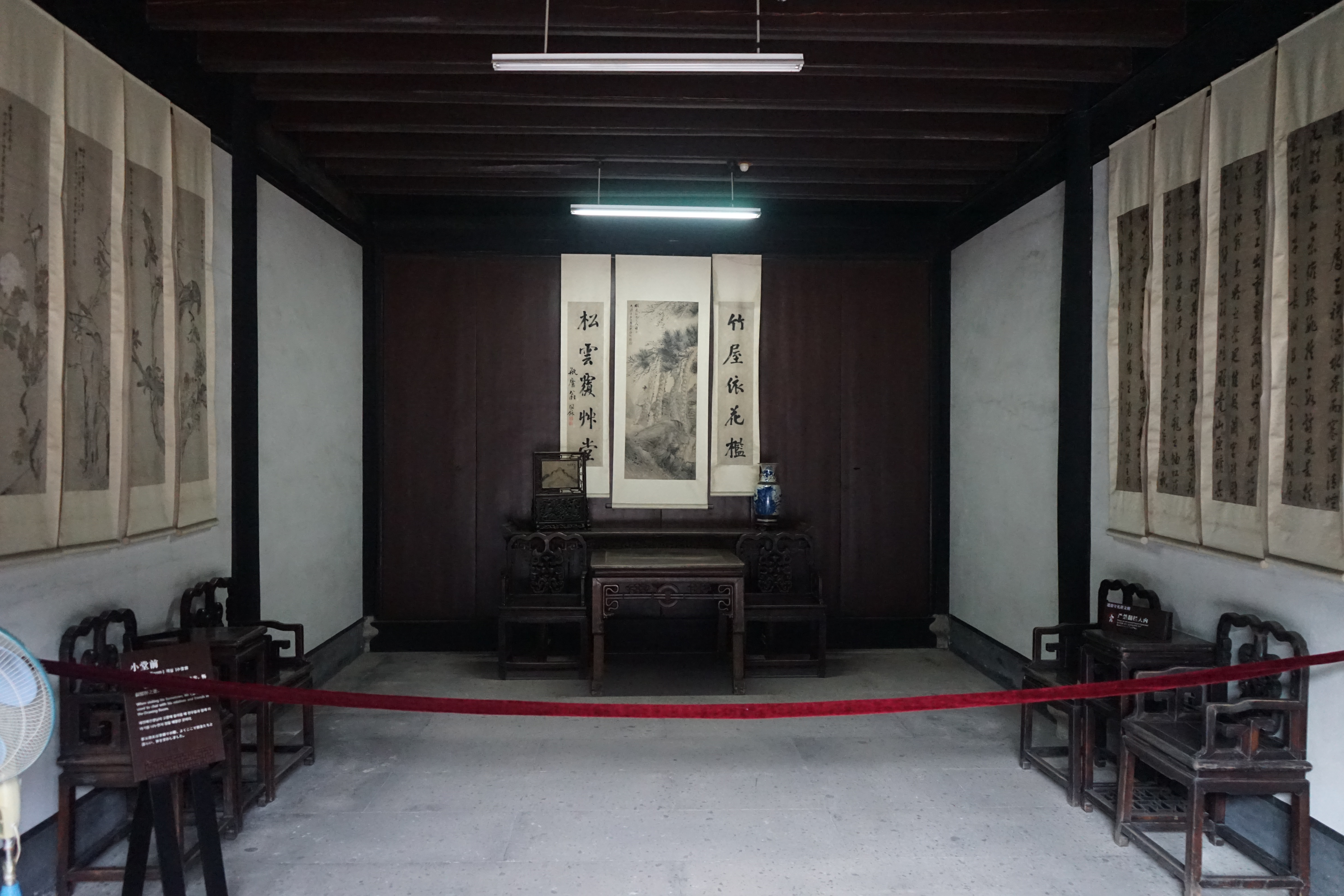
Reception room

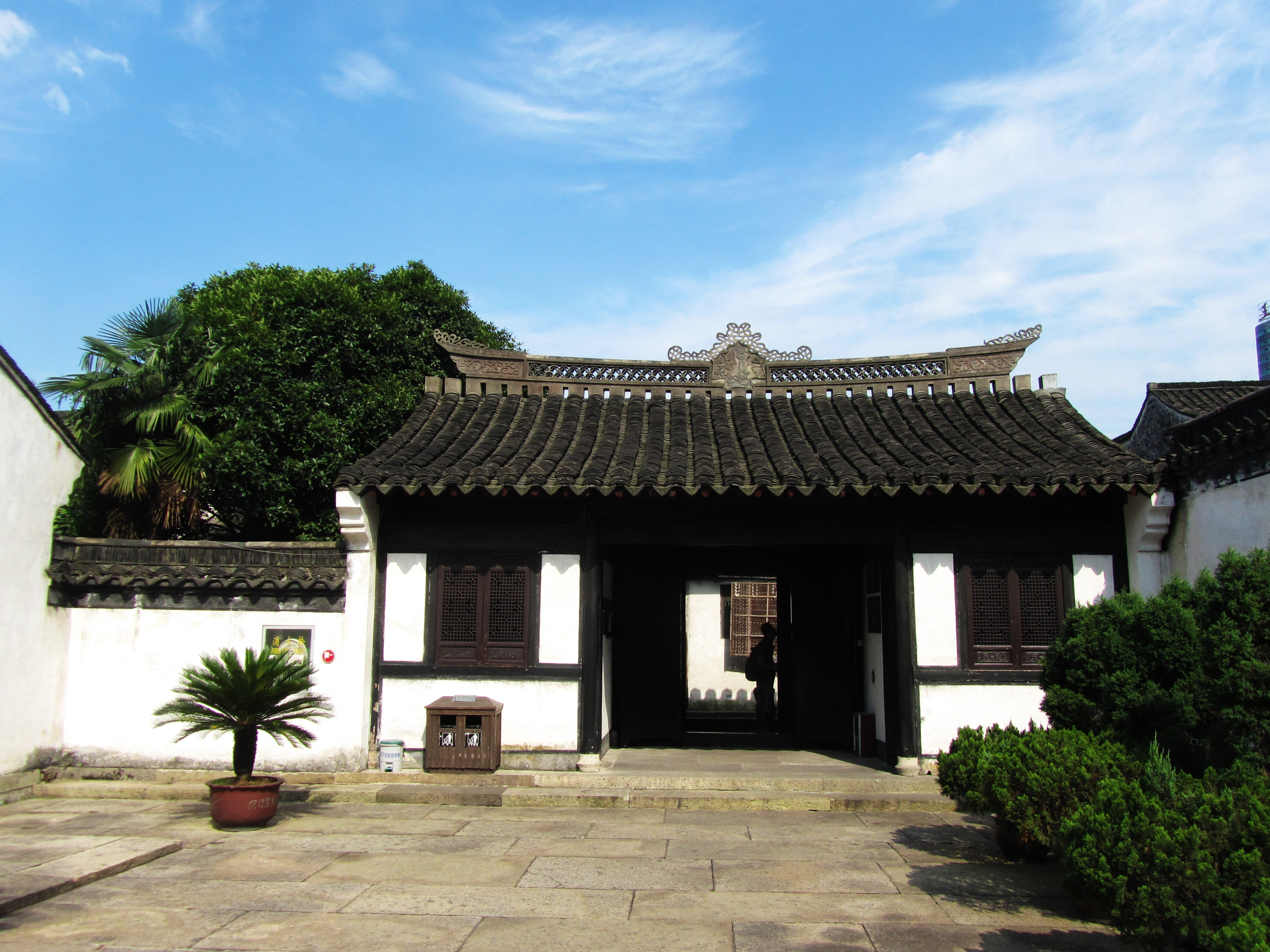
Entrance

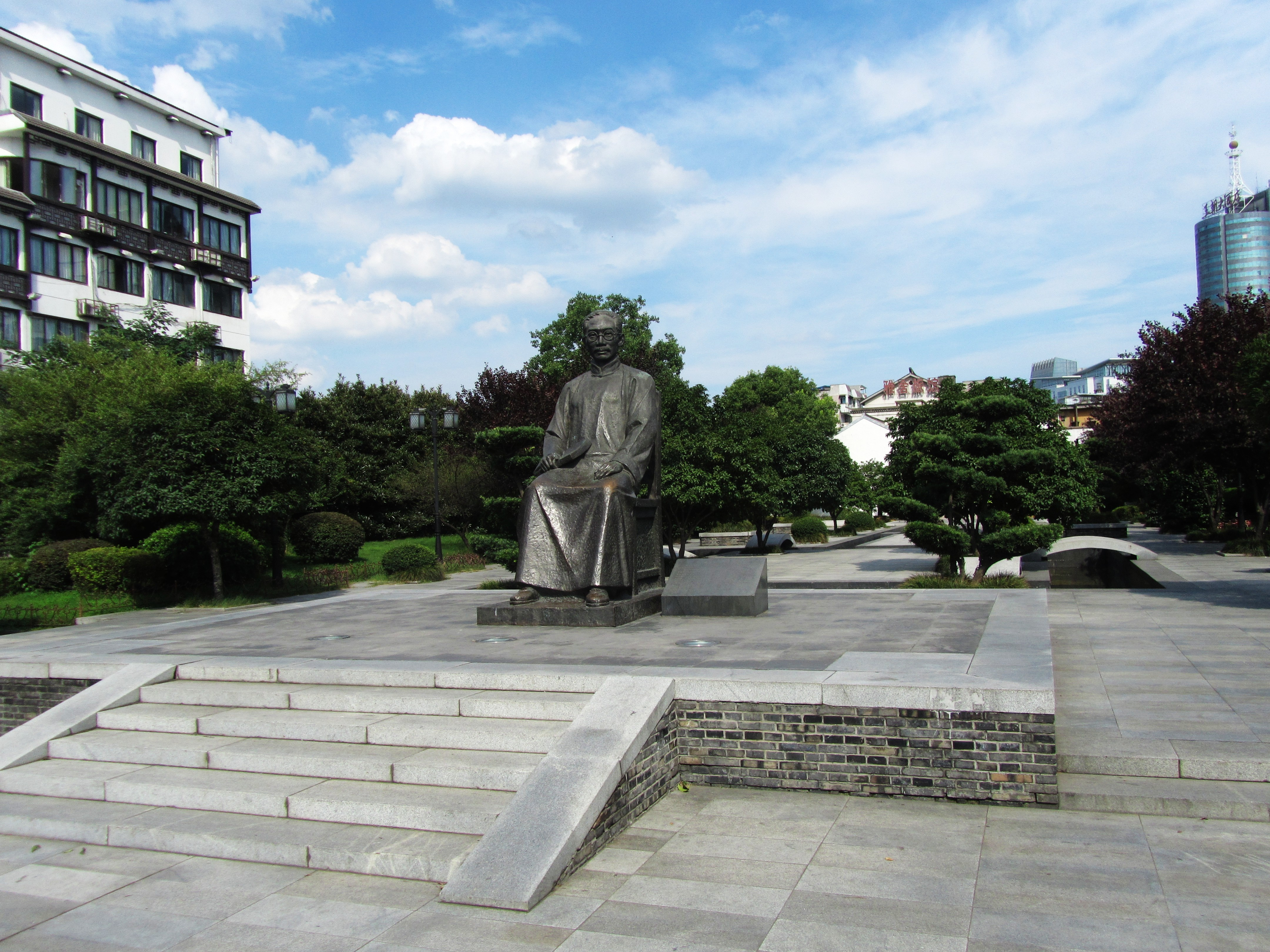
Statue of Cai Yuanpei
