= Chinese Education Improving Institute =

1921 education organization

The Chinese Education Improving Institute (CEII) is a Chinese education institution founded in 1921, with the aim of evaluating the status of Chinese education and improving it.

== History ==
After the Jiawu Sino-Japanese War, China advanced in several educational subjects. On December 23, 1921, the New Education Co-evolution Institute, New Education Magazine Institute, and Practical Education Investigation Institute established the CEII jointly. Meng Lu, Liang Qichao, Yan Xiu, Zhang Zhongren, Li Shizeng Cai Yuanpei, Fan Yuanyuan, Guo Bingwen, Huang Yanpei, Wang Jingwei, Xiong Xiling, Zhang Boweling, Li Xiangchen and Yuan Xitao were nominated as directors, and Tao Xinzhi was hired as director general. It was the largest educational group at that time, which aims to evaluate and assess the quality of Chinese education. It promoted the process of scientization, democratization, and globalization in education. After reopening in 2011, there are now over 300 members in the CEII, which has formed a platform for mutual improvement and mutual encouragement among educators, non-profit, specialized third-party think tanks.

The first board meeting was held in February 1922 in Shanghai. Fan Yuanlian was voted as the first chairman, and Tao Xingzhi was nominated as Director General. The Chinese Education Improvement Institute was the largest educational community at that time. It held annual meetings in Jinan, Beijing, Nanjing and Taiyuan, participated in world education conferences, and established the China Association for the Promotion of Civilian Education. It also published New Education Reviews and founded Xiaozhuang Experimental Village Normal School. Most principal members were educationists, including Hushi, Zhang Pengchun, Chen Heqin, etc. Since the establishment of the Chinese Education Improvement Institute, Chinese education accelerated the process of modernization, which was suspended due to wars.

=== Taiyuan annual conference ===
On August 17, 1925, the annual conference was held in Taiyuan, and over 700 participants attended the meeting. Ma Yinchu and Ye Gongchuo attended the meeting and delivered a speech. Over 90 cases were discussed and decided, with some defining the educational cases according to nationalism, carrying out military training in school, regulations of treatment at all levels of school staff, promotion of Tibetan culture, among others. The congress proposed in accordance with the case of the definite educational purpose of nationalism: China's current education aims to cultivate patriotic people based on the state. The congress believes that there are several points to achieve this; firstly, Chinese should pay attention to the culture of our own country to inspire the independent thinking of national development; secondly, to carry out military education so as to develop a strong body; thirdly, national shame education should be properly used to cultivate patriotic feelings; and fourthly, to promote science education to gain basic knowledge.

=== Rural education for the benefit of civilians ===
On December 3, 1926, China Education Improvement Association released the Declaration on the Reform of the National Rural Education, stating that the purpose of rural education is to train the student with "a scientific mind". To achieve this, the organization commented that "testing, researching, investigating, popularizing, and guiding people" within rural villages can serve about three to four million more people.

On December 1, 1927, Republic Daily published, Chinese rural education movement spot which is edited by Tao Xingzhi and translated by Zhang Zonglin. This is a report sent by the Chinese representative to the World Education Conference in Canada. The editorial emphasizes that rural education in China is a major event for one-fifth of the world's population. To this end, the China Education Improvement Society has formulated a plan to transform rural education in China with three phases. The report elaborates on the details of this plan and introduces the situation of carrying out rural education campaigns in Xiaozhuang, Nanjing.

== Restoration ==
On December 23, 2011, the restoration and reestablishment conference of the Chinese Education Improvement Institute was held in Beijing. Educational professors and scholars from the National Institute Of Education Sciences, Peking University, Renmin University of China, Tsinghua University, and Beijing Normal University, members of the media, and people from multiple backgrounds attended the conference. Advertising the CEII, Chu Chaohui is a researcher from the National Institute of Education Improvement.

The Educational Communication and Publication assisted in sub forums of 2014 WISE in Qatar, the annual conference session of Chinese Education Improving Development, Psychological Education in Elementary and Secondary Schools, educator spirit series, education philanthropy, and CSR consultation.

=== Consultants and directors ===
The counselors and directors of CEII come from UNESCO, China Law Society, China Writers Association, Peking University, among others.

=== Modern education reform in China ===
Meng Lu, Liang Qichao, Tao Xingzhi, Hu Shih, Cai Yuanpei, Huang Yanpei, Chen Heqin, Xiong Xiling, Zhang Boling, Zhang Pengchun, Fan Yuanyuan, Guo Bingwen, Li Xiangchen, Yuan Xitao, Yan Xiu, Zhang Zhongren, Li Shizeng reformed and constructing modern Chinese education, founded Xiaozhuang Experimental Village Normal School and China Association for the Promotion of Civilian Education, published New Education and New Education Review Scientific education. In December 1922, Professor Michael, an expert on education measurement in the USA, was invited by CEII to come to China to help compile various educational tests and train relevant personnel.

== See also ==
- Cai Yuanpei
