= Cai Yuanpei =

Chinese educator and statesman (1868–1940)

Ts'ai Yuan-p'ei Cai Yuanpei
- 蔡元培
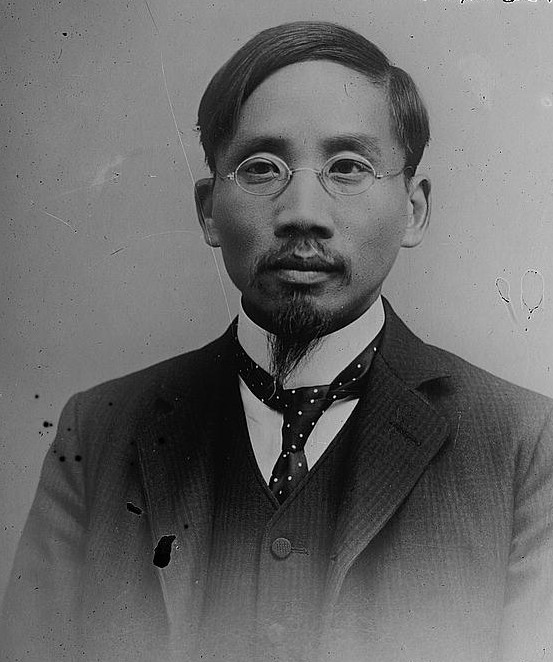

President of the Control Yuan
- In office 1928–1929
- Preceded by: Office established
- Succeeded by: Zhao Daiwen

President of Academia Sinica
- Preceded by: Office established
- Succeeded by: Zhu Jiahua

Personal details
- Born: 11 January 1868 Shaoxing, Zhejiang, Qing dynasty
- Died: 5 March 1940 (aged 72) British Hong Kong
- Spouses: Wang Zhao (m. 1889; died 1900); Huang Zhongyu (m. 1902, died); Zhou Jun (m. 1923–1940)
- Children: 7 (including Cai Weilian)
- Parent: Cai Guang (father)
- Education: Leipzig University; University of Hamburg
- Occupation: Philosopher, politician

Chinese name
- Chinese: 蔡元培
Transcriptions
Standard Mandarin
- Hanyu Pinyin: Cài Yuánpéi
- Gwoyeu Romatzyh: Tsay Yuanpeir
- Wade–Giles: Ts'ai^{4} Yüan^{2}-p'ei^{2}
- IPA: [tsʰâɪ ɥɛ̌npʰěɪ]

Courtesy name
- Traditional Chinese: 鶴卿
- Simplified Chinese: 鹤卿
Transcriptions
Standard Mandarin
- Hanyu Pinyin: Hèqīng
- Gwoyeu Romatzyh: Hehching
- Wade–Giles: Ho-ch'ing

Second alternative Chinese name
- Chinese: 孑民
- Literal meaning: Lone Citizen
Transcriptions
Standard Mandarin
- Hanyu Pinyin: Jiémín
- Gwoyeu Romatzyh: Jyemin
- Wade–Giles: Chieh-min

Cai Yuanpei (Chinese: 蔡元培; 1868–1940), spelt Ts'ai Yuan-p'ei (Wade–Giles: Ts'ai^{⁴} Yüan^{²}-p'ei^{²}) during his lifetime, was a Chinese philosopher and politician who was an influential figure in the history of Chinese modern education. He made contributions to education reform with his own education ideology. He was the president of Peking University, and founder of the Academia Sinica. He was known for his critical evaluation of Chinese culture and synthesis of Chinese and Western thinking, including anarchism. He got involved in the New Culture, May Fourth Movements, and the feminist movement. His works involve aesthetic education, politics, and education reform.

== Biography ==
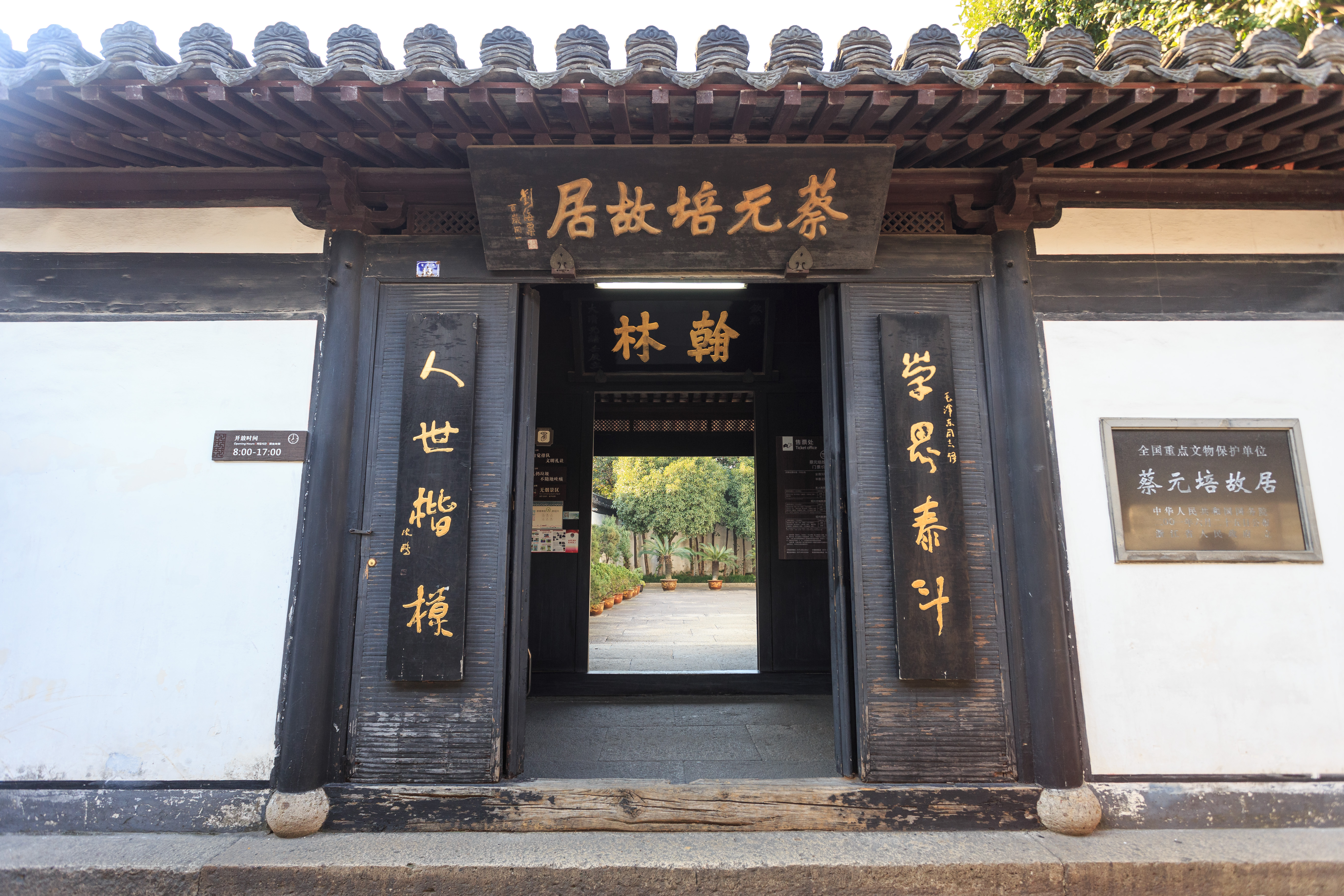
The Former Residence of Cai Yuanpei in Shaoxing

Born in Shanyin County, Shaoxing, Zhejiang, Cai was appointed to the Hanlin Academy at 26. In 1898, he became involved in administering institutes and became:

- Superintendent of Shaoxing Chinese-Western School (紹興中西學堂監督)
- Head of Sheng District Shanshan College (嵊縣剡山書院院長)
- Director-Teacher of the Special Class (特班總敎習) of Nanyang Public School (predecessor of Shanghai Jiao Tong University)

He established Guangfuhui in 1904 and joined Tongmenghui in Paris the next year, and became a member of the Chinese anarchist group led by Wu Zhihui, and Li Shizeng. He studied philosophy, psychology, and art history in the Universität Leipzig of Germany in 1907 under Karl Lamprecht and Wilhelm Wundt.

He became Minister of Education in the new Republic of China in 1912. As Minister of Education, Cai advocated that film should be used to support public education.

Cai returned to China in 1916 and served as the President of Peking University the following year. There he resumed his support, begun in his Paris years with Li Shizeng, for the Diligent Work-Frugal Study Movement, which sent worker-students to France. It was during his tenure at Peking University that he recruited such famous thinkers to the school as future Chinese Communist Party leaders Chen Duxiu and Li Dazhao, as well as thinkers like Hu Shih, a close friend, Liang Shuming and the painter Xu Beihong.

In 1919, after the student leaders of the May Fourth demonstrators were jailed, Cai resigned in protest (returning to office in September). Meanwhile, he and Xu Beihong wrote regularly for the Daily University of Peking University that dealt with broader issues than just campus politics. Xu addressed issues of Art and Art History and in 1920 a university art journal called Painting Miscellany was published. After resigning again in 1922, he spent a period of withdrawal in France. Returning in 1926, he supported his fellow-provincial Chiang Kai-shek and the Kuomintang's efforts to unite the country. Along with Wu Zhihui, Li Shizeng, and Zhang Renjie, he was known as one of the "Four Elders" of the Party, and a staunch anti-communist. He was appointed president of the Control Yuan, but soon resigned.

Cai was frustrated in his efforts to remodel the national system of education to resemble the French system, but in 1927, he co-founded the National College of Music, which later became the Shanghai Conservatory of Music, and in April 1928, he helped to found and became the first president of the Academia Sinica. He and a wide circle of colleagues founded the China League for Civil Rights which criticized the national government and Chiang Kai-shek for abuse of power. The situation worsened, however; the League could not attain the release from jail of Chen Duxiu, Cai's former dean at Peking University, for instance. In June 1933, the Academia Sinica's academic administrator and co-founder of the League, Yang Quan, was shot and killed in the street in front of the League's Shanghai offices. After a period of shock and reflection, Cai retired from public view in a statement denouncing the political repression of the Nanjing government.

After the outbreak of the Second Sino-Japanese War in 1937, partly because of declining health, instead of accompanying the national government to Sichuan, Cai moved to Hong Kong. He lived there in seclusion until his death in March 1940 at the age of 72.

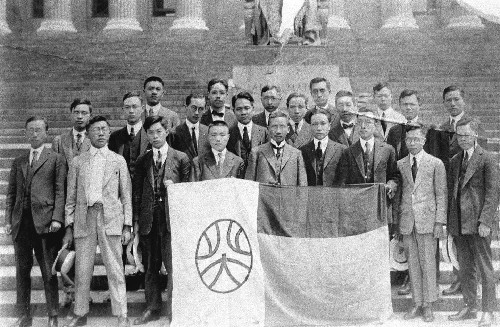
Cai with students from Peking University studying abroad

== Contributions to education ==
Under Cai's influence, and with his support for literati and educators in New China, Peking University became important for the development of Chinese education and culture. Cai established the Ministry of Education in 1927, modelled after the French education system.

=== Aesthetic education ===
Cai was an advocator and implementer of Chinese aesthetic education. He promoted the development of Chinese aesthetic education. He had his own unique insights into aesthetics which he associated aesthetics with Chinese traditional virtues. He connected aesthetics with education and politics, which is influenced by his experiences. He emphasized the importance of aesthetics for social stability and development. Besides, he proposed that aesthetics is beneficial to the formation of "public morality and civic virtue".

=== Women's education ===
Cai not only improved women's equity in the education system, such as the first women's admission in 1920 and mixed-sex education, but he also advocated feminism to change the traditional Chinese concept of women. Cai successively invited several feminists to teach at Peking University, including Chen Duxiu and Hu Shih. They played an important role in Cai's reform of women's education at Peking University, which was a breakthrough in the history of Chinese education.

== Pedagogy ==
=== Education independence ===
In the journal New Education (新教育), Cai proposed that education must be independent of the government. He tried to protect the University Council from direct control by the government.

=== Liberality and democracy ===
Cai raised the traditional virtue of "righteousness (義), reciprocity (恕) and humanity (仁)" based on the Western ideas of "Freedom, equity, fraternity". He was committed to establishing academic freedom and a pure research atmosphere at Peking University. He also tried to protect the freedom of educators and students, in education reform. Among the teaching staff at Peking University, there were many representatives of the new cultural movement such as Li Dazhao, Hu Shih, and Chen Duxiu. He also assembled notable conservative and old-fashioned scholars such as Gu Hongming and Liu Shipei to teaching at Peking University.

=== Five types of education ===
Cai advocated practising five types of education in the education system. The five types of education refer to military education for citizen (軍國民教育), utilitarian education (實利主義教育), civic education (公民道德教育), education for a world view (世界觀教育), and aesthetic education (美感學教育).

== Other thought ==
=== Women ===
Cai's perspectives on women combined both traditionalism and modernism. He believed in the subordinate, Confucian, relationship between husband and wife, holding that men rule outside the house, and women inside it (男主外女主内). His views on women's virtues were also conventional, including, for example, the idea that mothers should be the educators of their children. He held that an unmarried woman was not a virtuous one. Cai Yuanpei was a proponent of women's right to divorce and remarry. He strongly opposed foot binding and concubinage, both of which were widely practiced in China at the time. He also advocated education equity as well as physical education for women.

=== Political thoughts ===
He advocated anarchism about anti-oppression to re-establish human civilization. But he emphasized the importance of "a complete state", which is partly influenced by Western anarchism's views on the state and the family. Cai Yuanpei's view on anarchism mainly targets to abolish the colonial oppression China suffered. He studied anarcho-communism and was influenced by Pierre-Joseph Proudhon, Mikhail Bakunin, and Peter Kropotkin.

== May Fourth movement ==
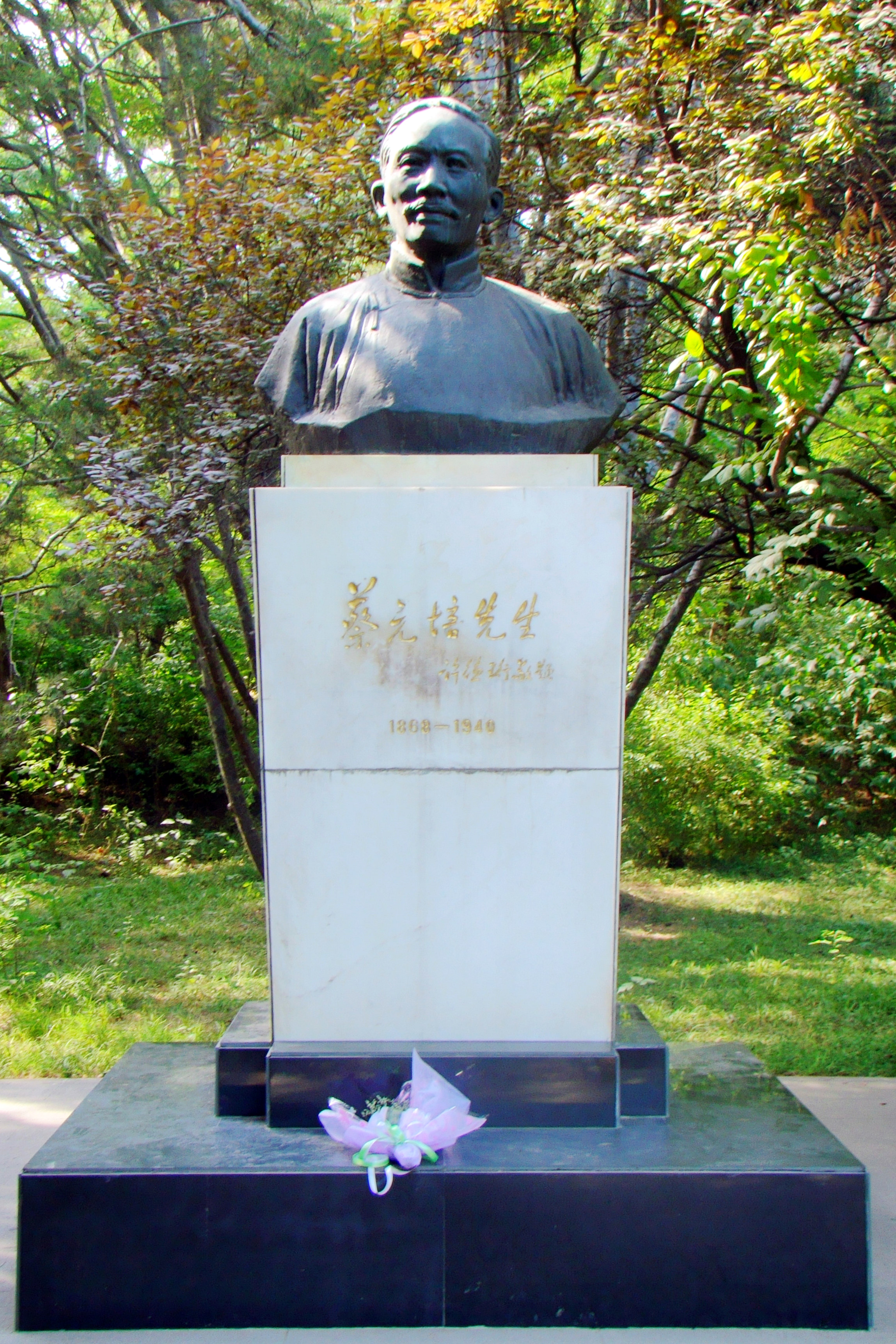
The statue of Cai Yuanpei in the campus of Peking University

=== New Civil Religion ===
Cai Yuanpei, Chen Duxiu, and Hu Shih put forward their own views on social values and were committed to solving the impact of the Revolution of 1911 on social systems and beliefs during the May Fourth Movement. Cai Yuanpei proposed that the formation of a new civil religion can be achieved by cultivating the Chinese to learn aesthetics, democracy, and science.

Consistent with the New Culture Movement, Cai contended that divine authorities and superstitions should be overthrown. He also viewed religious aesthetics as containing major potential for achieving transcendence through appreciation of beauty.

=== Linguistics ===
Just as Cai recommended the teaching of the non-state international language Esperanto in China, he also defended the written use of the spoken language (Pe̍h-ōe-jī, in which he himself also had written a novel (新年夢)) to replace the classical Chinese language of the early 20th century. This was one of the main demands of the May 4th Movement (1919).

== Representative works ==
=== New Year's Dream ===
New Year's Dream (新年夢) is a short story based on Cai's own life, reflecting his ideal society. It is influenced by Liang Qichao's utopian story The Future of New China. The writing style is "painful, even violent, and struggle". The story revolves around the protagonist, a Chinese citizen, telling about China's 20th-century revolution. Cai wrote the story while China was suffering from the war with Japan, and was also influenced by the Russo-Japanese War.

== See also ==
- Chinese Education Improving Institute
- Anarchism in China

Government offices
| Preceded by Position created | President of Control Yuan; 1928—1929 | Succeeded by Zhao Daiwen |
