= Wu Zhihui =

Chinese linguist and philosopher (1865-1953)

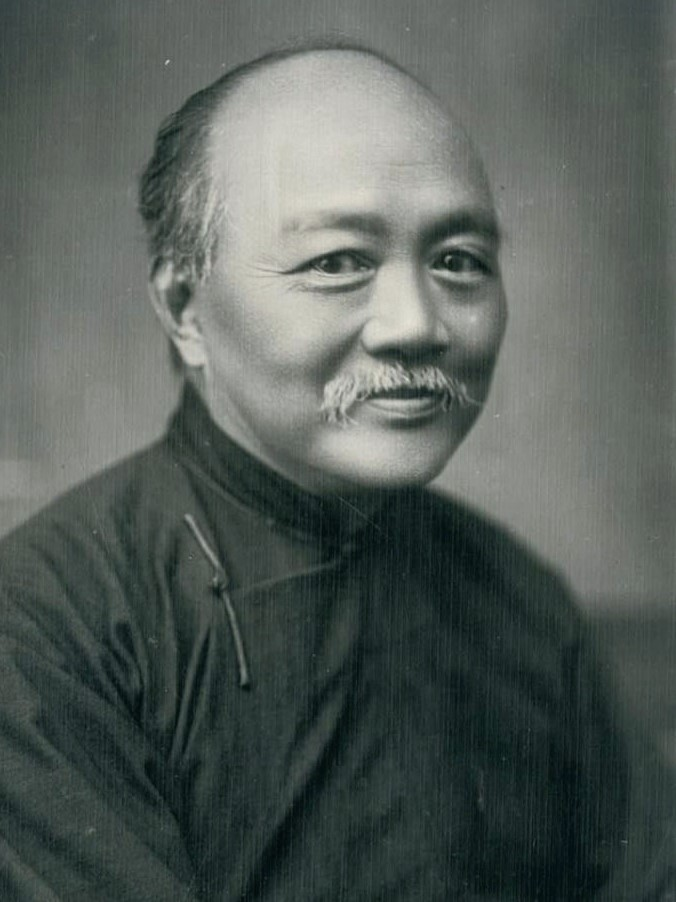
- Wu as pictured in The Most Recent Biographies of Chinese Dignitaries
- Born: 25 March 1865; Wujin, Changzhou, Jiangsu, Qing China
- Died: 30 October 1953 (aged 88); Taipei, Taiwan
- Known for: Bopomofo
- Political party: Kuomintang
- Spouse: Yuan Rongqing (袁榮慶)

Chinese name
- Traditional Chinese: 吳稚暉
- Simplified Chinese: 吴稚晖
Transcriptions
Standard Mandarin
- Hanyu Pinyin: Wú Zhìhuī
- Wade–Giles: Wu^{2} Chih^{4}-hui^{1}
- IPA: [ǔ ʈʂɨ̂xwéɪ]
Southern Min
- Tâi-lô: Ngôo Tī-hui

Chinese name
- Traditional Chinese: 吳敬恆
- Simplified Chinese: 吴敬恒
Transcriptions
Standard Mandarin
- Hanyu Pinyin: Wú Jìnghéng
- Wade–Giles: Wu^{2} Ching^{4}-heng^{2}
- IPA: [ǔ tɕîŋxə̌ŋ]
Southern Min
- Tâi-lô: Ngôo Kìng-hîng

Wu Jingheng (Chinese: 吳敬恆), commonly known by his courtesy name Wu Zhihui (Woo Chih-hui, Chinese: 吳稚暉; 25 March 1865 - 30 October 1953), also known as Wu Shi-Fee, was a Chinese linguist and philosopher who was the chairman of the 1912–13 Commission on the Unification of Pronunciation that created Zhuyin (based on Zhang Binglin's work) and standardized Guoyu pronunciation.

Wu became an anarchist during his stay in France in the first decade of the 20th century, along with Li Shizeng, Zhang Renjie, and Cai Yuanpei. With them, he was known as one of the strongly anti-communist "Four Elders" of the Nationalist Party in the 1920s.

== Career ==
Born into a poor family in Wujin, Jiangsu province as Wu Tiao (Chinese: 吳朓; pinyin: Wú Tiǎo), Wu Zhihui was an outstanding student, passing the challenging Juren examination in 1891.

He served at the Nanyang College Preparatory School Hall (now the Shanghai Nanyang Model High School). In 1903 in the Subao newspaper, Wu criticized the Qing government and derided then ruling Empress Dowager Cixi as a "withered old hag" and a "whore."

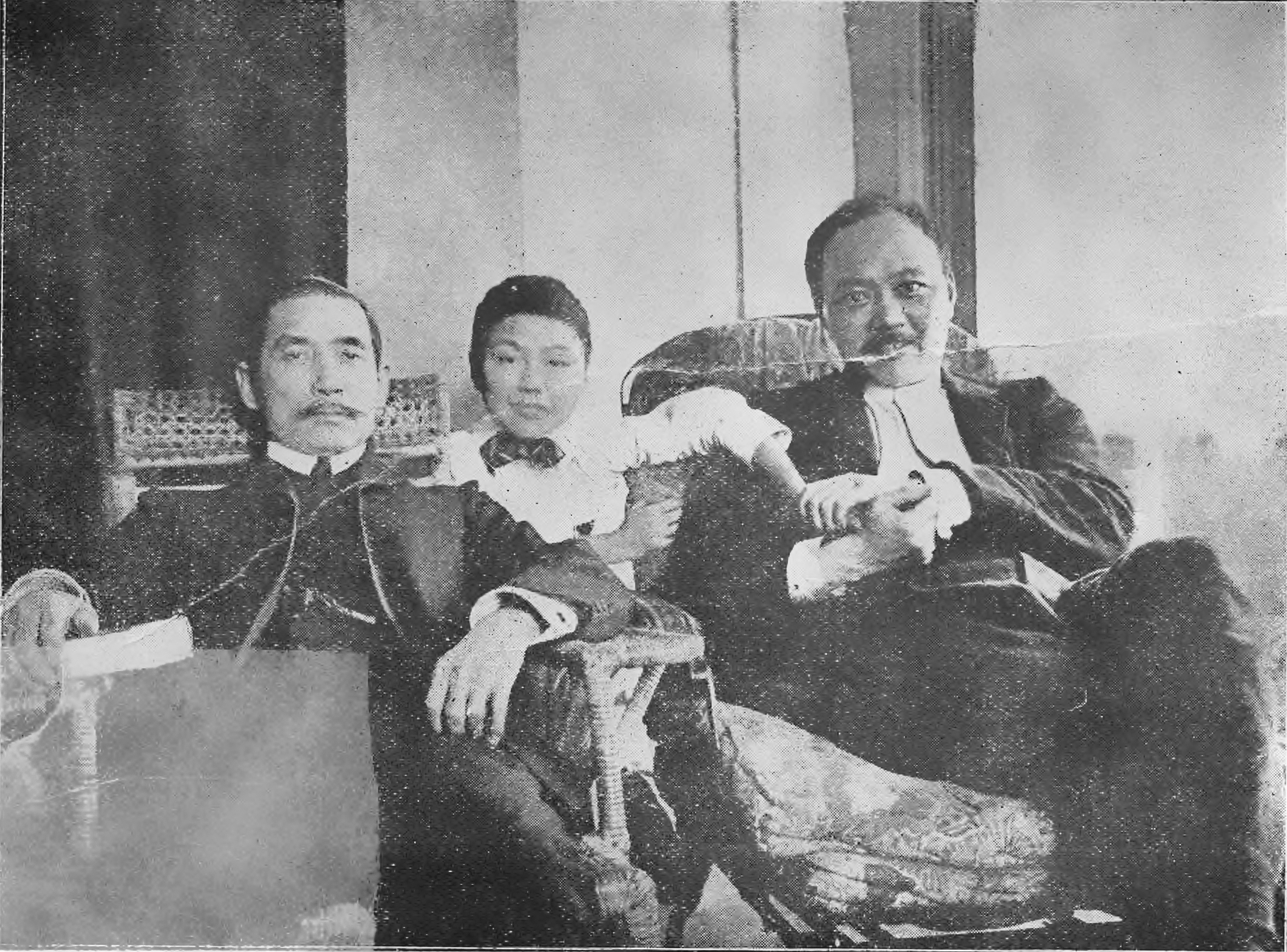
Wu Zhihui with founding father of China Sun Yat-sen and his son.

After this incident, Wu fled by way of Hong Kong to London. His official status enabled him to travel and live in Scotland and France. He attended university lectures in Edinburgh. In 1903, he went to Paris, where he renewed his friendship with Li Shizeng, the son of a high official he had met in Beijing, and with Zhang Renjie, well-connected son of a prosperous merchant. Although Wu was their elder by more than a decade, the three young scholars, although well-versed in the Confucian philosophy which dominated Chinese thought, were impressed by the doctrines of anarchism which flourished in France. Together with Li and Zhang, he formed the Shijie She (World Society), which became a center of anarchist thought and recruitment for several decades.

Together they joined the Tongmenghui, the precursor to the Chinese Nationalist Party (GMD), in 1905. Wu declared himself an anarchist the next year. He later founded influential revolutionary organizations like the Society to Advance Morality and supervised radical journals like New Era and Labor, China's first syndicalist magazine. He promoted science, rationalism, language reform, and the abolition of marriage. His ideas were revolutionary, but he estimated that it would take 3,000 years to achieve his vision of a utopian society. Wu was instrumental in the Diligent Work-Frugal Study Movement in France. Among his students were a large group of anarchists – and future communists.

== Return to China and allegiance to Kuomintang ==
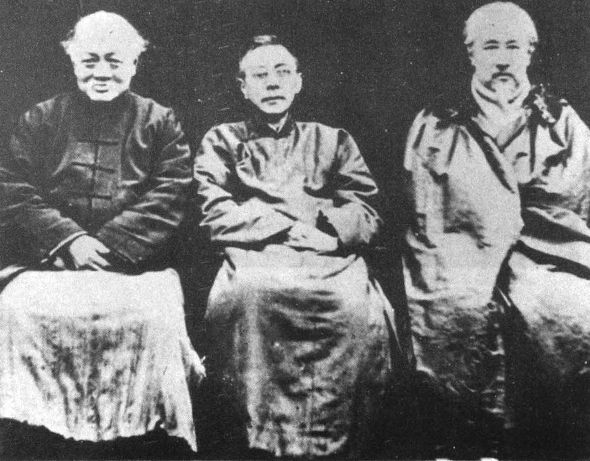
Wu, Zhang Renjie, and Li Shizeng, proprietors of Xin Shijie

Soon after their return in 1912, Wu, Li, Zhang Ji, and Wang Jingwei organized The Society to Advance Morality (Jinde hui, Chinese: 進德會), also known as the "Eight Nots," or "Eight Prohibitions Society (八不會 Babu hui)". Wu felt that the new Republic must not be menaced by the social decadence of the late Qing, evils which ranged from mah-jong and stag parties to taking second wives. True to its anarchist principles, there was no president or officers, no regulations or means to enforce them, and no dues or fines. Each level of membership, however, had increasingly rigorous requirements. "Supporting members," the lowest level, agreed not to visit prostitutes and not to gamble. "General members" agreed in addition not to take concubines. The next higher level further agreed not to become government officials — "Someone has to watch over officials" — not to become members of parliament, and not to smoke. Finally, the highest level also promised to abstain from alcohol and meat.

While declining to hold office, Wu did accept Cai Yuanpei's offer join the commission on language reform, beginning work on a phonetic system for writing which would replace regional dialects. This work eventually resulted in the Guoyu Zhuyin fuhao system which is widely used today. In June 1913, Wu was one of the founders of the journal Public Opinion (Chinese: 公論) When in 1913 Sun Yat-sen's Second Revolution failed, Wu and Li Shizeng for safety returned to France. Li and Wu founded the University of Lyon-France and launched the Work-Study movement.

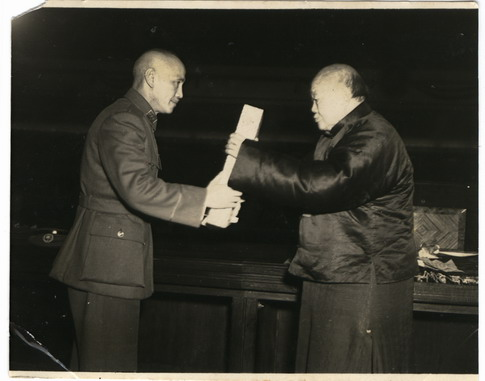
Delivering Ceremony of the Republic of China Constitution Wu and Chiang Kai-shek

In the 1920s, along with Li Shizeng, Zhan Renjie, and Cai Yuanpei, was one of the so-called "Four Elders" of the GMD and led the anti-communist campaign which drove leftists and communists from the party and supported Chiang Kai-shek. In accordance with his anarchist principles, Wu Zhihui declined any government office.

In 1943, National Government Chairman Lin Sen died in provisional wartime capital of Chongqing, Chiang Kai-shek inviting Wu to be the new president, but Wu declined, citing "three no's":

- I usually wear very casual clothes, but the heads of state wear tuxedos. I would feel uncomfortable.
- My ugly face, like a big shock.
- My people love to laugh. To see something funny makes me laugh, When foreign diplomats deliver credentials, I could not help but laugh. This would not be decent.

In 1946, Wu was elected to the National Assembly, which drew up a new constitution. He administered the oath of office to Chiang Kai-shek in May 1948, shortly before the government left the mainland for Taiwan.

He moved to Taiwan and was the teacher of Chiang Kai-shek's son, Chiang Ching-kuo. He died in Taipei at the age of 88. Chiang Ching-kuo carried out Wu's directive that his ashes be lowered into the sea off the island of Quemoy.

== Works ==
- 吳稚暉先生集(Collected Works of Mr. Wu Chih-hui)

== References and further reading ==
- Dirlik, Arif (1991). Anarchism in the Chinese Revolution. Berkeley: University of California Press. ISBN 0520072979.
- Rea, Christopher (2015). The Age of Irreverence: A New History of Laughter in China. Oakland: University of California Press. ISBN 9780520283848., chapter 4: "Mockery".
- "Wu Chih-hui," in Boorman, Howard L., ed. (1970). Biographical Dictionary of Republican China Vol III. New York: Columbia University Press. ISBN 0231045581., pp. 416–419.
- Scalapino, Robert A. and George T. Yu (1961). The Chinese Anarchist Movement. Berkeley: Center for Chinese Studies, Institute of International Studies, University of California. Available at The Anarchist Library.
- Zarrow, Peter Gue (1990). Anarchism and Chinese Political Culture. New York: Columbia University Press. ISBN 0231071388..
- "Mr. Wu Chih-hui," in Wen, Yuan-ning; et al. (2018). Imperfect Understanding: Intimate Portraits of Modern Chinese Celebrities. Amherst, MA: Cambria Press. ISBN 9781604979435., pp. 185–186.
