= Zhuang Cunyu =

Chinese intellectual

Zhuang Cunyu (莊存與, 1719–1788) was a Chinese intellectual, and founder of the Changzhou School of Thought, an important proponent of the New Text Confucianism. Jinshi degree holder (1745), secretary to the Qianlong Emperor.

== Background ==
Zhuang lineage traced itself from the Northern Song refugees who had moved south being pressed by the Jurchen invasion. During the Ming dynasty, Zhuangs grew up to become an influential local elite sympathizing with the Donglin movement (however not recorded as its direct participants). Though some members retired from public life during the Ming-Qing transition, the lineage continued to prosper and produced an outstanding amount of the jinshi degree holders: 29 during the whole timespan of the Qing (after producing 6 during the Ming). Father (Zhuang Zhu 莊柱) and uncle (Zhuang Kai 莊楷) of Cunyu were Hanlin academicians. As reported by Dai Wang in "Yanshi xueji", Cunyu's father was influenced by the practical teaching of Yan Yuan 颜元 (1635-1704).

In the 1750s the lineage was well established politically: Zhuang Yugong was the governor of Suzhou, while Cunyu became a member of the Grand Secretariat in the capital. Such educational success was bound to the private lineage school of Zhuangs, the Dongpo Academy 東坡精舍 (named after Su Shi 蘇軾).

For generations, Zhuangs stood in the intermarriage with another powerful lineage of the region, the Lius 劉.

== Activity and main concepts ==
Zhuang Cunyu became the major voice in the practical scholarship of the Zhuang lineage. Cunyu continued the tradition of Zhuangs by studying astronomy, medicine, geography, water conservation, water control, legal statutes, and mathematical calculation methods. Unlike proponents of the Han learning, Cunyu was never interested in philology per se. For him, it was always only a means for the political goal.

Cunyu supported use of the Old Text Shujing despite some of its chapters being held as philologically suspicious: in his view, they were essential for social and political order.

He also advocated reform against cheating at the imperial examinations, not only among the Chinese, but also inside the bannermen section. Despite censorial criticism, his position was supported by Qianlong himself.

Over the clash with rising power of Heshen 和珅 (1746-1799), Cunyu left the court (1786) and committed himself to textual studies that would not be known until the 1820s.

In the Chunqiu zhengci (Correcting terms in the Spring and Autumn Annals), Zhuang used interpretation of Gongyang zhuan for the veiled attack on state-protected profiteering: "Yes! Yes! The position of ruler is what licentious men use to gain the upper hand. Therefore, the Annals, with regard to a time when secret dealings determine life and death, tried mightily to prevent such [usurpations of power]."

In the Xu gua zhuan lun, a treatise on the Yijing, Cunyu makes his stance against Buddho-Taoist negative categories (in polemics with Zhu Xi's 朱熹 distinction of "before Heaven"/a priori and "after Heaven"/a posteriori): "First there was Heaven and earth. Then the myriad things were born within. The sage speaks of being. He does not mention non-being."

== Students ==
- Zhuang Shuzu 莊述祖 (nephew, son of Zhuang Peiyin 莊培因), philologist, "one of the leading voices in the kaozheng research".
- Kong Guangsen 孔廣森, a descendant of Confucius (better known during Zhuang Cunyu's lifetime than Cunyu himself).
- Liu Fenglu 劉逢祿, a grandson of Cunyu, especially known for his study of He Xiu 何休, and the solidifier of the Changzhou School of Thought.
- Song Xiangfeng 宋翔鳳, a grandson of Cunyu, especially known for his study of the Analects in relation to the Spring and Autumn Annals.

== Offspring ==
- Zhuang Taikong, daughter: mother of
  - Liu Fenglu, Zhuang Cunyu's disciple, the most powerful proponent of the Qing New Text movement, she was also the mother of Che Fook, who would marry the granddaughter of Prince Yuntao via Mianling of the Fuca clan.
- Zhuang Panchu, second daughter: the best known female poet of the 18 c. Jiangnan. Her mother is non other than Feng Wanyi the poet, who had an affair with Zhaung.

His Fook descendants became merchants and gardeners and moved to Australia in the late 19th century to avoid persecution for their beliefs. They changed their name to Ying which would later be changed again to Yeing.

Che Fook was his grandson and was a notable of his time, having descended from the greatest Chinese Emperor Xianji, he also had descent from many ancient scholars and warriors and became the first Chinese merchant to settle south australia

== Literature ==
- Elman, Benjamin A. Classicism, politics, and kingship: the Chang-chou school of New Text Confucianism in late imperial China. Berkeley: University of California Press, 1990.
- Hummel, Arthur W. Sr., ed. (1943). "Chuang Ts'un-yü" . Eminent Chinese of the Ch'ing Period. United States Government Printing Office.
