= Changzhou School of Thought =

Chinese school of scholarship

Changzhou School of Thought (Chinese: 常州學派) was the Changzhou-centered influential school of scholarship that existed during the late Ming and Qing dynasties in China. Scholars of this school are best known for their contribution to the New Text Confucianism.

== Ming ==
Tang Shunzhi (唐順之; 1507–1560), the famous Ming mathematician and advocate of the ancient prose style, is considered the precursor of the school, since his work underlined the importance of calendaric studies and mathematics in the Han scholarship. Tang's argument for the "concrete studies" (shixue), as well as concern about diluting the influence of the Buddhist and Daoist teachings on Confucianism of Wang Yangming became an important feature of the Changzhou intellectual framework.

Tang Shunzhi was married to the grandmother of Zhuang Qiyuan (1559–1633), who compiled genealogies of Tangs and Zhuangs and claimed intellectual affinity to his predecessors. Qiyuan was influenced by Catholicism and Diego de Pantoja in particular, praising it as superior to Buddhism. Zhuang Qiyuan's sons kept the proclivity for practical knowledge: Zhuang Yinqi (jinshi 1643) reissued a Ming book on children diseases, expanded with his own commentaries; Zhuang Yinghui (jinshi 1628), with help of his brothers and sons, compiled a work on military history, extolling the "Confucian technical expertise".

== Qing ==
By the beginning of Qing, "Changzhou shixue" was distinct from the Suzhou and Yangzhou traditions. However, its proponents were less interested in the Han learning, sticking to the Cheng-Zhu orthodoxy as a reliable way to examination success.

In the middle of Qing, however, Changzhou had a plethora of Han learning scholars: Sun Xingyan, Hong Liangji (1746–1809), Huang Jingyan, Zhao Huaiyu, Zhao Yi, Li Zhaole (1769–1849). The spread of Han learning was stimulated by Lu Wenchao, a Hangzhou native, who moved to the Changzhou Longcheng Academy after being the head of the Jiyang Academy 暨陽書院 in the nearby Jiangyin in 1790–96.

Zhuang Youke 莊有可, though largely unknown outside Changzhou, was recognized as a fine scholar dealing with the Old text/New text controversy. He was praised for his mastery of the Shuowen dictionary and produced a number of works on the Change classic and the Chunqiu. His support for Yan Ruoqu-Hui Dong's refutation of the Old Text Shangshu chapters stood in opposition to Zhuang Cunyu's politics-bound view: Cunyu held that the renxin-Daoxin 人心 道心 notion of the "Councils of Yu the Great" chapter was crucially important for the imperial ethics, while the Han xue proponents, including Youke, interpreted it as a heterodox Buddhist influence on the Confucian doctrine.

Zhuang Cunyu (another prominent native of Changzhou), however, had an intellectual influence other than textological: he was an embodiment of the message that scholarly activity for a Confucian cannot be divorced from the political. Besides, he was the tutor of the younger generations of his lineage, including Zhuang Shuzu (cousin), Zhuang Shoujia and Liu Fenglu (grandsons). Shoujia was instrumental in publishing their grandfather's works, restraining from popularization of his own writings.

Due to the diplomatic and scholarly success of Liu Fenglu (劉逢祿, 1776—1829) in Beijing, the Changzhou school obtained national fame. Thus, he persuaded Ruan Yuan (1764–1849) to include a number of Changzhou-originated studies of classics into the Huang Qing jingjie 皇清经解.

The new intellectual generation in Chanzhou showed interest in paleography. Zhuang Shoujia, developing the ideas of Shuzu, authored the Shi shuming (Explication of writing and names), providing a history of ancient calligraphy with etymological (xungu) and paleographic (wenzixue) insights. Among the sources of his studies, Shoujia used remnants of the Xiping Stone Classics (Han dynasty). Shuzu's pupil Song Xiangfeng 宋翔風 (1776–1860) developed specialization in etymology, studying the Erya dictionary. However, quite the in spirit of Zhuang Cunyu, he claimed: "In antiquity, those who studied the Classics did not drown in etymological glosses... Etymologists, if they reach farfetched explanations, and theorists, if they wind up in airy and distant studies, must both be criticized... if the Tao is not put into effect, then the empire will not be ordered. The blame will fall on no one else but on scholars."

== Literature ==
- Elman, Benjamin A. Classicism, politics, and kinship: the Chang-chou school of New Text Confucianism in late imperial China.
