= Guo Shoujing =

Chinese astronomer and mathematician (1231–1316)

- 郭守敬
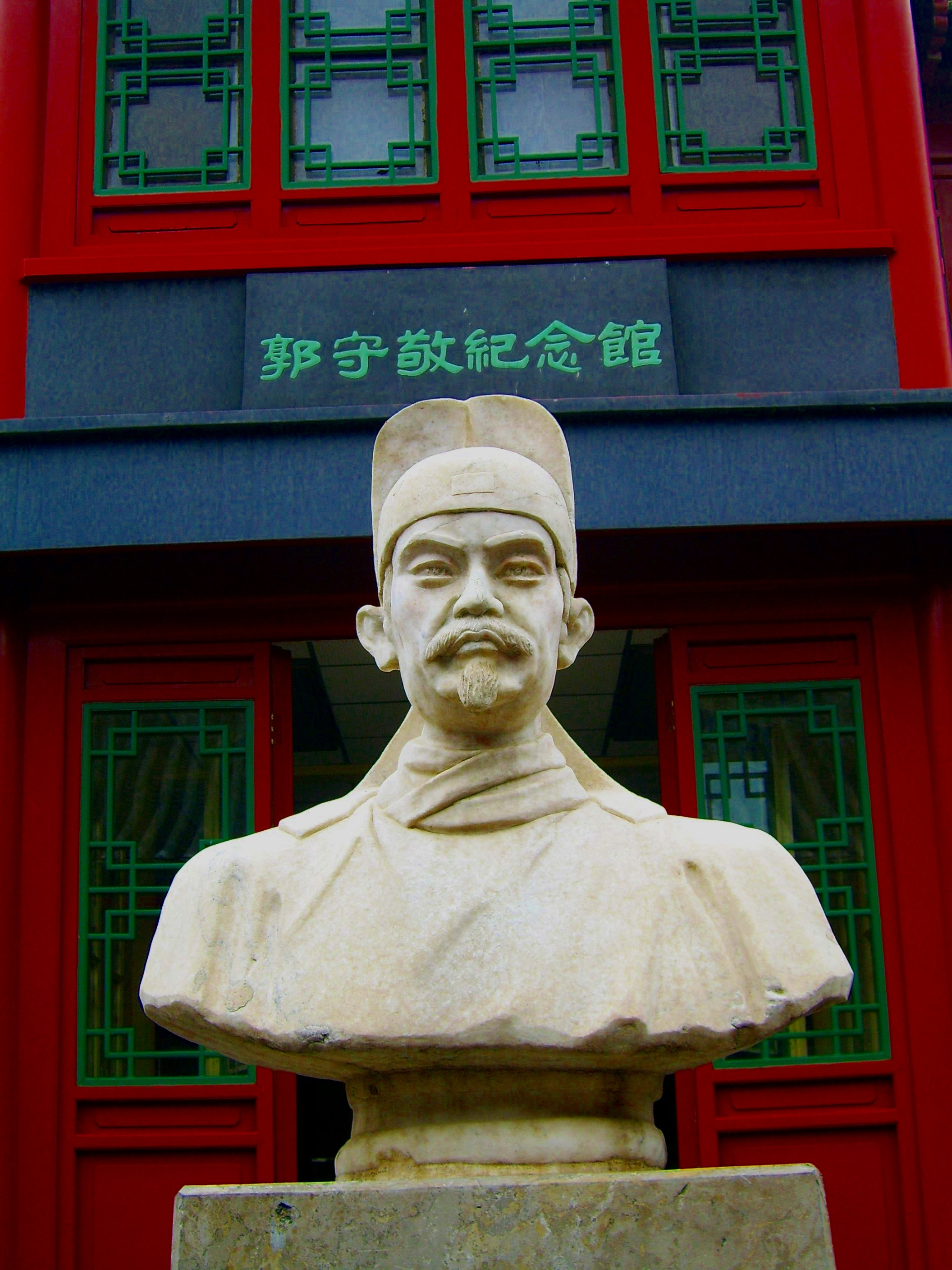
- Born: 1231; Xingtai, Hebei, China
- Died: 1314 or 1316
- Known for: Shòushí Calendar (授时曆; 'Season-Granting Calendar')
- Scientific career
- Fields: Astronomy, hydraulic engineering, mathematics
- Institutions: Gaocheng Astronomical Observatory

Guo Shoujing
- Chinese: 郭守敬
Transcriptions
Standard Mandarin
- Hanyu Pinyin: Guō Shǒujìng
- Wade–Giles: Kuo^{1} Shou^{3}-ching^{4}
- IPA: [kwó ʂòʊtɕîŋ]
Yue: Cantonese
- Yale Romanization: Gwok Sáu-ging
Southern Min
- Tâi-lô: Kueh Tsiú-kìng (col.); Kok Siú-kìng (lit.)

Guo Shoujing (Chinese: 郭守敬; 1231–1316), courtesy name Ruosi (若思), was a Chinese astronomer, hydraulic engineer, mathematician, and politician of the Mongol Empire and Yuan dynasty. The later Johann Adam Schall von Bell (1591–1666) was so impressed with the preserved astronomical instruments of Guo that he called him "the Tycho Brahe of China." Jamal ad-Din cooperated with him.

== Early life ==
In 1231, in Xingtai, Hebei province, China, Guo Shoujing was born into a poor family. He was raised primarily by his paternal grandfather, Guo Yong, who was famous throughout China for his expertise in a wide variety of topics, ranging from the study of the Five Classics to astronomy, mathematics, and hydraulics. Guo Shoujing was a child prodigy, showing exceptional intellectual promise. By his teens, he obtained a blueprint for a water clock which his grandfather was working on, and realized its principles of operation. He improved the design of a type of water clock called a lotus clepsydra, a water clock with a bowl shaped like a lotus flower on the top into which the water dripped. After he had mastered the construction of such water clocks, he began to study mathematics at the age of 16. From mathematics, he began to understand hydraulics, as well as astronomy.

== Career ==
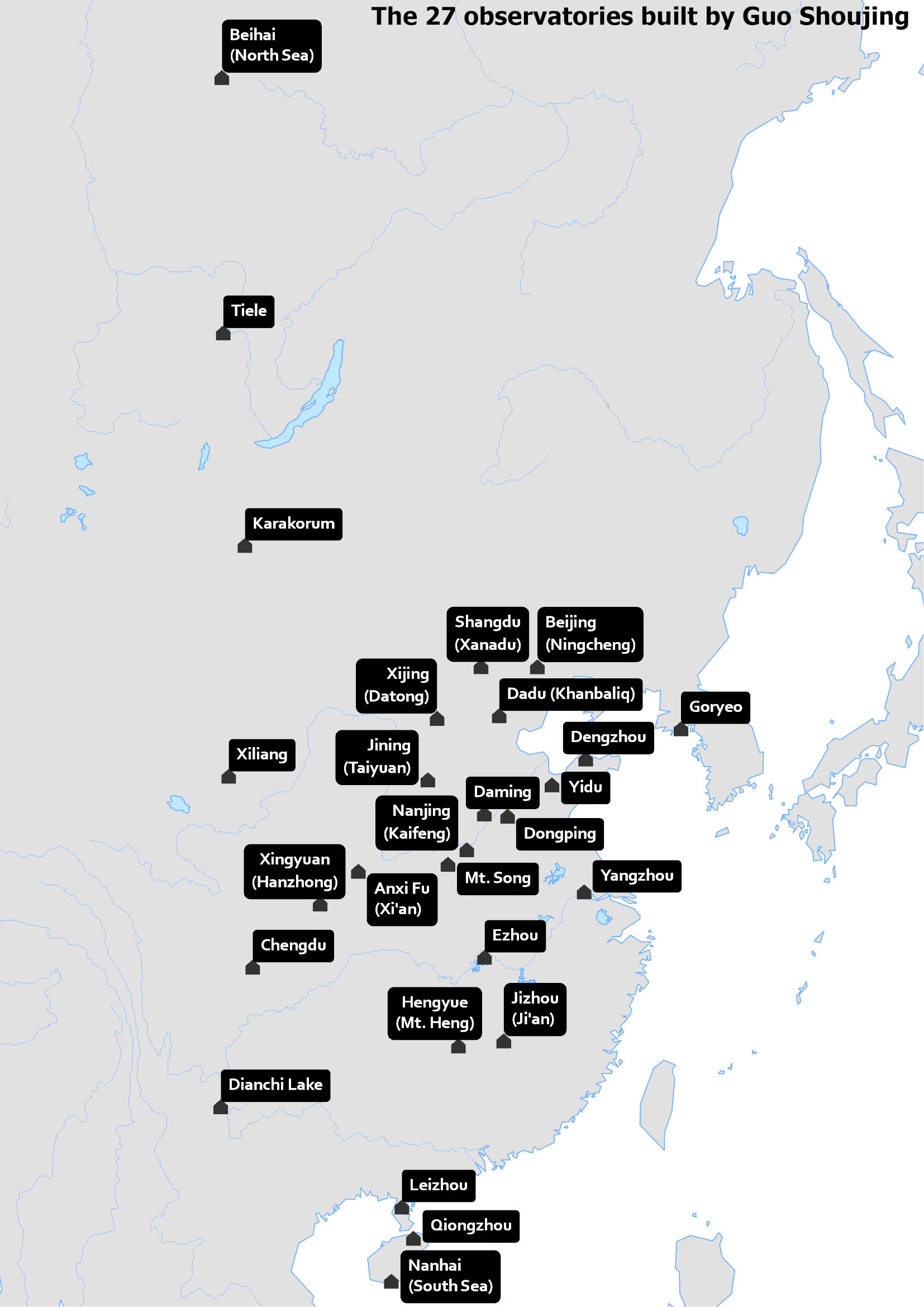
The 27 observatories built and used by Guo Shoujing and his colleagues

At 20, Guo became a hydraulic engineer. In 1251, as a government official, he helped repair a bridge over the Dahuoquan River. Kublai realized the importance of hydraulic engineering, irrigation, and water transport, which he believed could help alleviate uprisings within the empire, and sent Liu Bingzhong and his student Guo to look at these aspects in the area between Dadu (now Beijing or Peking) and the Yellow River. To provide Dadu with a new supply of water, Guo had a 30 km channel built to bring water from the Baifu spring in the Shenshan Mountain to Dadu, which required connecting the water supply across different river basins, canals with sluices to control the water level. The Grand Canal, which linked the river systems of the Yangtze, the Huai, and the Huang since the early 7th century, was repaired and extended to Dadu in 1292–93 with the use of corvée. After the success of this project, Kublai Khan sent Guo off to manage similar projects in other parts of the empire. He became the chief advisor of hydraulics, mathematics, and astronomy for Kublai Khan.

Guo began to construct astronomical observation devices. He has been credited with inventing the gnomon, the square table, the abridged or simplified armilla, and a water powered armillary sphere called the Ling Long Yi. The gnomon is used to measure the angle of the sun, determine the seasons, and is the basis of the sundial, but Guo Shoujing revised this device to become much more accurate and improved the ability to tell time more precisely. The square table was used to measure the azimuth of celestial bodies by the equal altitude method and could also be used as protractor. The abridged or simplified armilla was used to measure the angle of the sun, as well as the position of any celestial body. The Ling Long Yi is similar to an abridged armilla except larger, more complex, and more accurate. Kublai Khan, after observing Guo's mastery of astronomy, ordered that he, Zhang, and Wang Xun make a more accurate calendar. They built 27 observatories throughout China in order to gain thorough observations for their calculations. In 1280, Guo completed the calendar, calculating a year to be 365.2425 days, just 26 seconds off the year's current measurement. In 1283, Guo was promoted to director of the Observatory in Beijing and, in 1292, he became the head of the Water Works Bureau. Throughout his life he also did extensive work with spherical trigonometry. After Kublai Khan's death, Guo continued to be an advisor to Kublai's successors, working on hydraulics and astronomy.

== Personal life ==
=== Death ===
His year of death is variously reported as 1314 or 1316.

== Analysis of his contributions ==
Guo Shoujing was a major influence in the development of science in China. The tools he invented for astronomy allowed him to calculate an accurate length for the year, which allowed Chinese culture to set up a whole new system of exact dates and times, allowing for increasingly accurate recording of history and a sense of continuity throughout the country. The calendar stabilized the Chinese culture allowing subsequent dynasties to rule more effectively. Through his work in astronomy, he was also able to more accurately establish the location of celestial bodies and the angles of the Sun relative to Earth. He invented a tool which could be used as an astrological compass, helping people find north using the stars instead of magnets.

Within the field of hydraulics, even at a young age, Guo was revolutionizing old inventions. His work on clocks, irrigation, reservoirs, and equilibrium stations within other machines allowed for a more effective or accurate result. The watches he perfected through his work in hydraulics allowed for an extremely accurate reading of the time. For irrigation, he provided hydraulics systems which distributed water equally and swiftly, which allowed communities to trade more effectively, and therefore prosper. His most memorable engineering feat is the man-made Kunming Lake in Beijing, which provided water for all of the surrounding area of Beijing and allowed for the best grain transport system in the country. His work with other such reservoirs allowed people in inner China access to water for planting, drinking, and trading. Guo's work in mathematics was regarded as the most highly knowledgeable in China for 400 years. Guo worked on spherical trigonometry, using a system of approximation to find arc lengths and angles. He stated that pi was equal to 3, leading to a complex sequence of equations which came up with an answer more accurate than the answer that would have resulted if he did the same sequence of equations, but instead having pi equal to 3.1415.

As people began to add onto his work, the authenticity of his work was questioned. Some believe that he took Middle Eastern mathematical and theoretical ideas and used them as his own, taking all the credit. However, he never left China which would have made it more difficult for him to access others' ideas. Otherwise, Guo was highly regarded throughout history, by many cultures, as a precursor of the Gregorian calendar as well as the man who perfected irrigation techniques in the new millennium. Many historians regard him as the most prominent Chinese astronomer, engineer, and mathematician of all time.

His calendar would be used for the next 363 years, the longest period during which a calendar would be used in Chinese history. He also used mathematical functions in his work relating to spherical trigonometry, building upon the knowledge of Shen Kuo's (1031–1095) earlier work in trigonometry. It is debated amongst scholars whether or not his work in trigonometry was based entirely on the work of Shen, or whether it was partially influenced by Islamic mathematics which was largely accepted at Kublai's court. Sal Restivo asserts that Guo Shoujing's work in trigonometry was directly influenced by Shen's work. An important work in trigonometry in China would not be printed again until the collaborative efforts of Xu Guangqi and his Italian Jesuit associate Matteo Ricci in 1607, during the late Ming Dynasty.

== Influence ==
Guo Shoujing was cited by Tang Shunzhi 唐順之 (1507–1560) as an example of solid practical scholarship, anticipating the rise of the Changzhou School of Thought and spread of the "evidential learning".

Asteroid 2012 Guo Shou-Jing is named after him, as is the Large Sky Area Multi-Object Fibre Spectroscopic Telescope near Beijing.

== See also ==
- History of Beijing
