= On the Question of Women's Liberation =

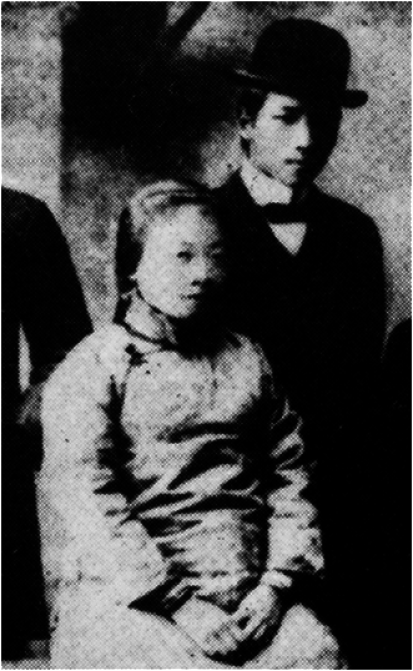
He-Yin Zhen, author of On the Question of Women's Liberation. Pictured with Liu Shipei.

On the Question of Women's Liberation (女子解放問題; Nǚzǐ jiěfàng wèntí) is an article by Chinese anarchist-feminist He-Yin Zhen (何殷震). The work was published in 1907 to Natural Justice (天義; Tiānyì), the official journal of The Society for the Restoration of Women's Rights. Among many things, the article elaborates on He-Yin Zhen's views on women's labor, Confucian tradition, Western and European women's suffrage movements, prostitution, and the role of men in women's liberation. Much focus is placed on the nature of liberation and women's active versus passive participation in the movement.

In this and other writings, He-Yin Zhen conveyed a view of the inequality between men and women as imminently connected to systems of class and racial inequality, requiring a widespread social and economic upheaval and radical restructuring of society. This involved the abolition of the traditional family structure, private property, the separation of the sexes (nannü youbie), and all hierarchical systems.

The classification of He-Yin Zhen's feminism is subject to some scholarly debate. Some propose her feminism is better defined as an organic position rooted in women's historical and present experiences rather than exclusively anarchist. Others maintain that He-Yin Zhen's awareness of the interconnectedness of class, foreign-imperial, and gender-based oppression, as well as her commitment to a fundamental political and economic restructuring of society, places her squarely in an anarcha-feminist ideology.

== Provenance ==
Together with her husband Liu Shipei, He-Yin Zhen founded the Society for the Restoration of Women's Rights (Nüzi Fuquan Hui), and its accompanying journal, Natural Justice, which published On the Question of Women's Liberation in 1907. The journal ran from 1907 to 1908 and published many of He-Yin Zhen's other works on feminist theory, women's liberation, anarchism, and Socialism. The journal's establishment in 1907 coincided with the intellectual and revolutionary ferment in China at the turn of the twentieth century. Western imperialism in trade and foreign relations, the upheaval of China's dynastic system, and the spread of enlightenment thinking and free-market capitalism were among the social, political, and economic developments around the time of the work's publication. In addition, rising competition with tariff-protected foreign industrial imports and mechanization adversely affected many Chinese women who relied on home-based textile and handicraft manufacturing for household financial stability. The workplace conditions faced by these women were one frequent subject of He-Yin Zhen's writing, and which few other feminist scholars of her time discussed. Natural Justice was also the source of the first Chinese translation of Karl Marx's Communist Manifesto, introducing Communist thought to China. However, despite the significant impact her publications have had on both feminist thought and Chinese Communism, He-Yin Zhen's works are not widely studied in Chinese or feminist scholarship. In addition, many of her works are misattributed to her husband.

In this and other works, He-Yin Zhen elected to hyphenate her last name, including her mother's maiden name He as part of her belief that the patrilineal surname was a function of patriarchal oppression. In other publications, her name is signed He Zhen.

== Summary and topics ==
=== Nannü (concept) ===
The literal translation of "nannü" (男女) is "man woman", however its use in He-Yin Zhen's writings has no direct English translation. He-Yin Zhen used the concept nannü to describe a system of unequal social relations between men and women throughout history. This is achieved through "political and moral institutions" including religious rituals and cultural practices that construct and separate the categories of "man" (nanxing) and "woman" (nüxing). He-Yin refers to Confucian traditions in The Book of Rites including marriage customs and the practice of cloistering as several such institutions that enforce unequal social relations.

As Lydia Liu, Rebecca Karl, and Dorothy Ko propose, the concept of nannü can be interpreted as an "analytical category" or lens through which to understand the situation and status of woman in the past and present. Within the system of nannü, the status of woman can be understood in He-Yin Zhen's writings as an effect or outcome of unequal treatment, differing access to education, and confinement to the domestic sphere. This constructs a social distinction between the sexes that does not exist in nature or independent of the social interventions and institutions that uphold it. He-Yin Zhen argues that both the inequality between men and women in society as well as the very existence of the categories "man" and "woman" themselves are not the result of nature but of differing treatment. She elaborates on this concept in The Feminist Manifesto, writing:

"by 'men' (nanxing) and 'women' (nüxing), we are not speaking of 'nature,' but the outcome of differing social customs and education. If sons and daughters are treated equally, raised and educated in the same manner, then the responsibilities assumed by men and women will surely become equal. When that happens, the nouns 'nanxing' and 'nüxing' would no longer be necessary"

Nannü is therefore also a means of division and distinction through which social hierarchies are constructed. Through the analytical category of nannü, He-Yin Zhen created a way of understanding women's' unequal social position and proposed a radical rethinking of gender that came well before similar poststructuralist feminist theorists.

=== "Passive" and "active" calls for liberation ===
At the center of He-Yin Zhen's feminist beliefs is the principle that the liberation of women must involve not only freedom of the body but of the mind as well. This is reflected in her position on issues such as the situation of working-class women and sexual freedom, which in her view achieved physical liberation, but not "liberation of the mind." She instead argues that women's liberation can only be achieved through women's initiation and active participation.

She distinguishes between "active" and "passive" calls for women's liberation: liberation initiated by women for women, and that which is pursued by the male intelligentsia largely for the benefit of themselves. He-Yin questioned the sincerity of men who took up the call for women's liberation and proposed three ulterior motives behind these calls: the "pursuit of self-distinction", the "pursuit of self-interest", and the "pursuit of self-comfort."

She proposed first that women's liberation served as a means of gaining power and authority for Chinese male intellectuals through an appeal to newly popular "civilized" European standards. This appeal to European standards can be seen among several of He-Yin Zhen's male contemporaries, including Jin Tianhe and Liang Qichao. She remarks that, whereas in the past Chinese men derived such authority by subordinated and cloistering women, "when the tides turn in favor of Europeanization, they attempt to acquire distinction by promoting women's liberation." That is, the motivation that had once led men to subordinate women (the pursuit of self-distinction) had been recently redirected towards support for women's liberation with the rise of Western and European influence in China. However, the motive itself remained unchanged.

He-Yin Zhen pointed to men's self-interested desire to escape the responsibility of providing for the household as another motive behind "passive" calls for women's liberation. She observed that men had begun to champion women's higher education and role in the workforce, and argued that such actions were driven by the "pursuit of self-interest" and profit that could be gained from women's' additional labor.

Finally, men had begun to champion women's liberation out of a "pursuit of self-comfort", she argued. This men sought to avoid the task of running the household and performing domestic chores. This was achieved by a political discourse that emphasized the importance of household management and family education, which fell to the responsibility of women. Thus, a "secret desire to make use of women [and their labor]" was the genuine motive behind men's pursuit of women's liberation.

He Yin-Zhen argued that the championing of women's liberation by men was in fact an "empty discourse" with "no intent on conferring real rights on women." She argued that men's passive liberation left Chinese women in a worse position by allowing them to enter the workforce and "partake of men's hard work" while still expecting women to perform the same domestic labor and household management. This can be compared to the concept of the "second shift" in many modern-day feminist discourses.

In this way, passive liberation according to He-Yin Zhen is driven "purely out of a desire to claim women as private property" by using women as a tool for male social advancement and self-interest. In He-Yin Zhen's views, women were once again being treated as the property of men and used for their benefit. This unchanging state of affairs, the possession and exploitation of women by men, is cited as an enduring cause behind women's subordination throughout history in her works. Thus, for He-Yin Zhen, true liberation can only be achieved through women's active participation and effort.

=== Critique of parliamentary politics ===
He-Yin Zhen offered a critique of western women's liberation movements' prioritization of parliamentary politics, and promoted instead a series of economic and social reforms targeted at elevating the status of working women and men. She acknowledged the progress won by suffragists in Finland, Norway, England, and Italy, where efforts to expand women's right to vote and increase women's representation in political offices were underway. However, He-Yin Zhen disagreed with the agenda of western women's suffrage that was being won through the route of parliamentary politics, and argued that such a method did not adequately address the root causes of social injustice and women's subordination. Rather, pursuing women's liberation through parliamentary politics only empowered a small, wealthy minority of women, and did little to advance the interests of working-class women. Such a movement, she argued, could not truly be liberation if it served only the aristocratic elite. Universal suffrage was flawed as well in He-Yin Zhen's views, as existing power structures and class stratification would impede free elections while parliamentary positions would still be largely exclusive to the upper class. She argued that without addressing the root of social injustice and patriarchal oppression the majority of working-class women would continue to suffer.

He-Yin Zhen questioned whether female members of parliament would truly advance the needs of working-class women. She reflected on the election of Social Democrats to parliaments across Europe, and claimed that these parties had failed to bring economic reforms and enact change for the common people whom they represented. Applying this situation to women, He-Yin Zhen argued that it is, therefore, possible for progressive individuals and parties to become forces of oppression within parliamentary politics. She asserted that the common woman's interest was not represented by the election of elite upper-class women to political office. In fact, wealthy women constituted a "third force" of oppression that the common woman faced, next to men and the government. The class divide between women would thus be exacerbated by the elevation of a wealthy minority to political office.

He-Yin argued that women's liberation must be accompanied by a larger social and economic upheaval in order to secure the freedom of all women. Liberation could not be achieved in her view until the circumstances of economic exploitation faced by both female and male laborers ended. The women's liberation movements of her time would merely enable the "professional enslavement" of working women by failing to reform the capitalist economic system that exploited the labor of the working class. She advocated for a system of economic reforms, including the establishment of "common property" (gongchan), and ultimately the abolition of government. These reforms, which suffragists in Europe and America failed to enact, were in He-Yin Zhen's view the only path to true liberation for women and men of all classes.

=== Communalization ===
She closed the essay by writing, "Labor is a natural calling for women. But everyone, not just poor women. When labor is borne only by some poor women, then it is a kind of subservient labor. So, in our opinion, if there were the implementation of a system of communalized property, then everyone, whether man or woman, would labor equally..."
