= Yanjingshi ji =

Yanjingshi ji 揅经室集 (a title page)

Yanjingshi ji (Chinese: 研经室集 or simplified Chinese: 揅经室集; traditional Chinese: 揅經室集; pinyin: Yánjīngshì jí; Wade–Giles: Yen-ching-shih chi; “Collection from the Studio for the Investigation of Classics”, also translated as “Collection from the Studio of Studying the Classics”, etc.) is a collection of the private writings of the Qing dynasty scholar-official and philologist Ruan Yuan 阮元 (1764–1849), first printed in 1823. Ruan Yuan was one of the most important editors and scholars of Confucian research during the reigns of the Qianlong Emperor (r. 1736–1795) and the Jiaqing Emperor (r. 1796–1820), and a leading figure of the so-called Qian-Jia School (乾嘉学派) of evidential scholarship.

The writings of his entire life are largely included in it, except for several works for which he served as the leading editor. The collection reflects his academic views and his methods of scholarship. Ruan Yuan was also the editor of an influential annotated edition of the Thirteen Classics (Shisanjing) and of the collection Huang-Qing jingjie (皇清经解).

According to Fang Chao-ying the collection of Ruan Yuan’s poems and short prose writings was printed in 1823 and divided into five sections, of which 29 juan consist of prose and 11 juan of verse. Two supplements were later added: one in 9 juan, printed in 1830, and another in 6 juan, printed in or after 1844. A separate selection of his poetry, entitled Yanjingshi shilu (揅經室詩錄 / 揅经室诗录), in 5 juan, appeared in 1833.

In a new Zhonghua Shuju edition the whole work is divided into three parts: Yanjingshi ji (揅经室集), Yanjingshi xuji (揅经室续集, “Supplement/Continuation”), and Yanjingshi waiji (揅经室外集, “Outer Collection”), which together comprise 64 juan (volumes). The Waiji (“Outer Collection”) contains 173 summaries of works that were not included in the Siku Quanshu. Ruan Yuan himself stated that about half of these pieces were not entirely written by him.

The Hanyu da zidian, for example, uses for the a photographic reprint of the first edition of the original publication in the Sibu congkan series (四部丛刊).

== See also ==
- Shisanjing zhushu
- Qian-Jia xuepai

== Bibliography ==
- Yanjingshi ji (Sibu congkan) - Wikisource
- Ruan Yuan 阮元, punctuated and annotated by Deng Jingyuan 邓经元: Yanjingshi ji 揅经室集(上下). Zhongguo lishi wenji congkan 中国历史文集丛刊. Zhonghua shuju 中华书局 1993. ISBN 9787101001907 (book.douban.com)
