= Gong Zizhen =

Chinese poet, calligrapher and intellectual

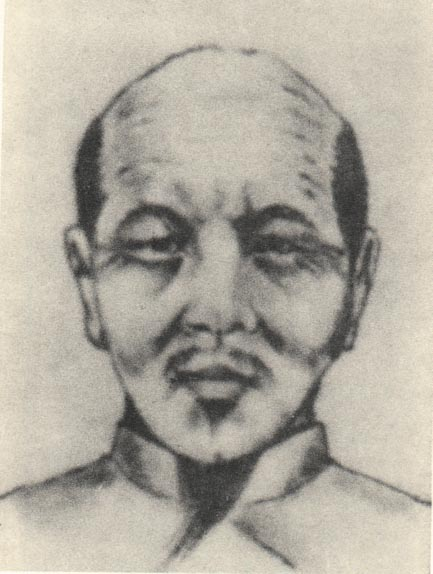

Gong Zizhen (Chinese: 龔自珍; Wade–Giles: Kung Tzu-chen; 1792–1841), courtesy name (zi) Seren, literary name (hao) Ding'an, was a Chinese poet, calligrapher and intellectual active in the 19th century whose works both foreshadowed and influenced the modernization movements of the late Qing dynasty.

== Biography ==
He was born August 22, 1792, in the town of Renhe near Hangzhou, Zhejiang province, into an eminent family of scholars and officials. He moved to the capital Beijing with his parents when he was six, about 1100 kilometers to the northwest of his hometown. As a child, he was required to read all the classics in literature, poetry and philosophy. Gong was a grandson of the famous philologist Duan Yucai, who put a lot of hope in Gong and began educating him in the Han period old text classics. Later on Gong studied the new text tradition under Liu Fenglu, as well as Tiantai Buddhism under Jiang Tiejun. But, when he grew up, Gong became more interested in social and government affairs. In 1821 when he was 29, Gong passed the imperial civil examinations at the provincial level and obtained the title of Juren, or Recommended Man. He succeeded to a series of metropolitan posts in the Qing administration. His lifelong desire to serve the nation was frustrated by repeated failure to gain the Jinshi degree, or Presented Scholar. When he finally did pass that in 1829, his low ranking on the list disqualified him from the Hanlin Academy. The highest office he ever held was a chief official on the Board of Rites and Ceremonies in 1837.

Gong was interested in studies of the Gongyang Zhuan, using its theory of the historical cycle (chaos - ascending peace - universal peace) to criticize the current social practices in the Qing empire. Concern over the Qing failure to deal with internal problems and Western pressures led Gong in 1830 to join other progressives in founding a literary club to agitate for reform. Unlike most of his political companions, Gong stressed that the greatest danger to Qing society was not Western pressure but the loss of the spiritual basis of society. He also pointed out that apart from domestic troubles, the country was facing external threats from the Russian Czar in the north and the Japanese aggression in the east. In his style and behavior, Gong Zizhen was reminiscent of the early Qing "essentrics", breaking the ritual norms, gambling, and being disrespectful to elders.

In his stance against opium, Gong became a confidant of Imperial Commissioner Lin Zexu. When he learned the Qing government had sent his colleague Lin to the south to suppress the opium trade, Gong was excited and advised Lin to beef up military defenses on the southern and southeastern coasts to fend off a possible invasion of British warships. However, seeing that he could do little to change the government as a minor official, Gong resigned in disillusionment in 1839 when he was only 47.

He began to be sunk in confusion, depression and agony following his frustration at court. He tried to relieve himself from the miserable life by resorting to Buddhism. However, he failed to become a Buddhist, because his passion for the nation and his concern about the general public prevented him from cutting off the external connection with the secular world.

On the way home to Hangzhou, Gong wrote 315 poems in the traditional form of "qiyan jueju" or seven-character, four-line "cut-shorts." In these poems, the writer recorded what he had seen along the journey, expressed his deep concern about the country on the eve of the conflict that would become known as the First Opium War and put forward his ideas for reform. Gong believed all the problems that had been plaguing the government and society were caused by a disheartening dearth of talents. He said the imperial court was staffed by unqualified officials, and even "dumb" thieves and "incapable" bandits were roaming the streets around the country. He also predicted the country would inevitably fall into chaos one day due to this lack of talent. Gong fell ill when he arrived at Danyang, Jiangsu province, about 200 kilometers to the north of his hometown, and died there soon after on September 26, 1841.

The poems Gong wrote on the journey were later compiled into a book, Ji Hai Miscellaneous Poems, which is still quite popular among Chinese people today. His first poems date from the age of 15, and during his life he composed a total of 27 volumes of poetry, in addition to more than 300 articles and nearly 800 songs. His works include Annotations on Chinese, A Textual Research on The Three Rituals, A Critical Review of 'History of the Han and Latter Han Dynasties', and Verification on the Names and the Objects in 'Songs of Chu'.

Gong's New Text Confucianism influenced thinking of later reform-minded Chinese intellectuals, especially Kang Youwei and Kang's student Liang Qichao.

A Memorial Hall to Gong opened in 1990 in Hangzhou.
