= Xing Bing =

Confucian scholar and commentator

Xing Bing (Chinese: 邢昺; pinyin: Xíng Bǐng; Wade–Giles: Hsing Ping; born 932; died 1010), courtesy name Shuming (叔明), was a Confucian scholar and commentator of the Northern Song dynasty.

== Life and works ==
Xing was a native of Jiyin 濟陰 in the prefecture of Caozhou 曹州 (today Cao County (Caoxian) in Shandong Province). He was highly proficient in the Confucian Classics.

He wrote commentaries on the Analects (Lunyu 论语), the Classic of Filial Piety (Xiaojing 孝经), and the Erya (尔雅). His works were among those later referenced in the compilation of the Hanyu da zidian (HYDZD).

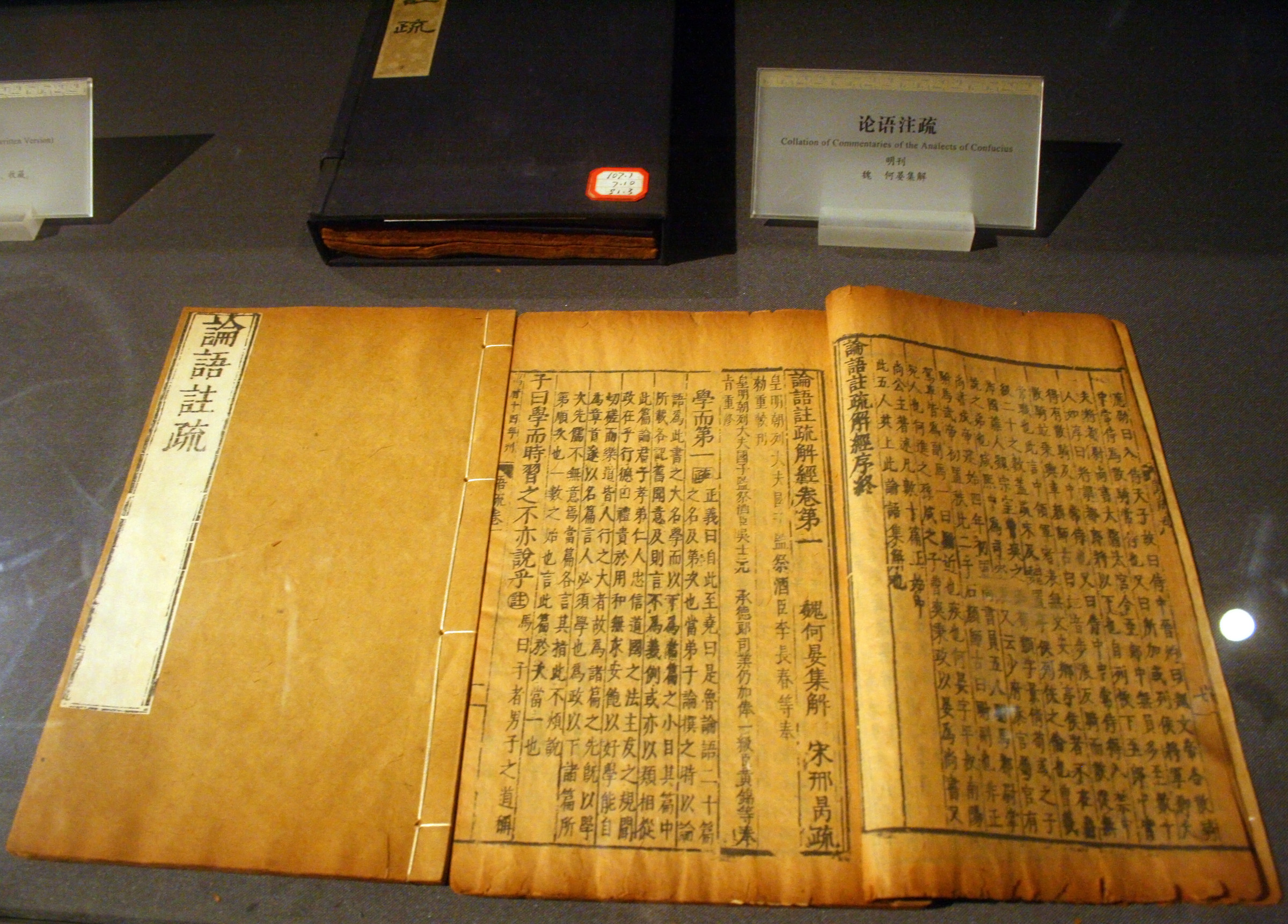
Lunyu zhushu (Commentary and Subcommentary on the Analects) - A copy of (Wei) He Yan's commentary (zhu) on the Analects, with the subcommentary (shu) by (Song) Xing Bing, printed during the Ming dynasty

His subcommentary (shu) on the Analects discusses the notions of mind, nature, principle, and the Mandate of Heaven. Xing argued that Heaven possessed neither mind nor mandate, rejecting the idea of a personified Heaven.

== Works ==
- Lunyu shu 论语疏 (in Shisanjing zhushu)
- Xiaojing zhushu 孝经注疏 (in Shisanjing zhushu)
- Erya shu 尔雅疏 (in Shisanjing zhushu)

== Bibliography ==
- Han-Ying Zhongguo zhexue cidian 汉英中国哲学辞典. Kaifeng, 2002.
- Wu Qingfeng 吴庆峰: "Xing Bing 邢昺: Erya shu 尔雅疏", in: Qian Zengyi 钱曾怡 and Liu Yuxin 刘聿鑫 (eds.): Zhongguo yuyanxue yaoji jieti (中国语言学要籍解题, “Fundamental Works of Chinese Linguistics”). Jinan: Qilu shushe 齐鲁书社, 1991. ISBN 7-5333-0210-9.
