= 2012 Guo Shou-Jing =

Main-belt asteroid

Discovery
- Discovered by: Purple Mountain Obs.
- Discovery site: Purple Mountain Obs.
- Discovery date: 9 October 1964

Designations
- Named after: Guo Shoujing (Chinese astronomer)
- Alternative designations: 1964 TE_{2} · 1971 SF_{1} 1974 MS
- Minor planet category: main-belt · Flora · Interloper

Orbital characteristics
- Epoch 4 September 2017 (JD 2458000.5)
- Uncertainty parameter 0
- Observation arc: 63.80 yr (23,303 days)
- Aphelion: 2.7436 AU
- Perihelion: 1.9137 AU
- Semi-major axis: 2.3286 AU
- Eccentricity: 0.1782
- Orbital period (sidereal): 3.55 yr (1,298 days)
- Mean anomaly: 6.7252°
- Mean motion: 0° 16^{m} 38.64^{s} / day
- Inclination: 2.9066°
- Longitude of ascending node: 277.11°
- Argument of perihelion: 36.696°

Physical characteristics
- Dimensions: 5.67 km (calculated); 11.65±0.26 km 11.931±0.080 km 12.248±0.035 km 12.82±3.11 km 14.46±4.71 km 14.70±4.42 km
- Synodic rotation period: 12 h
- Geometric albedo: 0.030±0.006; 0.035±0.041; 0.04±0.04; 0.04±0.03; 0.0486±0.0016; 0.070±0.004; 0.24 (assumed)
- Spectral type: C · S
- Absolute magnitude (H): 13.20 · 13.30 · 13.4 · 13.46 · 13.51±0.22 · 13.56

2012 Guo Shou-Jing, provisional designation 1964 TE_{2}, is a carbonaceous asteroid and Florian interloper from the inner regions of the asteroid belt, approximately 13 kilometers in diameter. It was discovered on 9 October 1964, by astronomers at the Purple Mountain Observatory in Nanking, China. The asteroid was named after Chinese astronomer Guo Shoujing.

== Orbit and classification ==
Guo Shou-Jing orbits the Sun at a distance of 1.9–2.7 AU once every 3 years and 7 months (1,298 days). Its orbit has an eccentricity of 0.18 and an inclination of 3° with respect to the ecliptic. The body's observation arc begins 11 years prior to its official discovery observation, with a precovery taken at Palomar Observatory in August 1953.

=== Florian interloper ===
Guo Shou-Jing is a dark, carbonaceous asteroid but possesses the orbital characteristics of a member of the Flora family, which is one of the largest groups of bright, stony S-type asteroids in the main-belt. It is therefore thought to be an unrelated interloper that does not origin from the Flora family's parent body.

== Physical characteristics ==
Guo Shou-Jing has been characterized as a carbonaceous C-type asteroid by Pan-STARRS photometric survey.

=== Fragmentary lightcurve ===
In August 2010, a fragmentary rotational lightcurve of Guo Shou-Jing was obtained from photometric observations by French amateur astronomer René Roy . Lightcurve analysis gave a rotation period of 12 hours with a brightness variation of 0.05 magnitude (U=1+).

=== Diameter and albedo ===
According to the surveys carried out by the Japanese Akari satellite, and the NEOWISE mission of NASA's Wide-field Infrared Survey Explorer, Guo Shou-Jing measures between 11.65 and 14.70 kilometers in diameter and its surface has a low albedo between 0.030 and 0.070.

Based on purely orbital criteria, the Collaborative Asteroid Lightcurve Link (erroneously) assumes an albedo of 0.24 – derived from 8 Flora, the largest member and namesake of the Flora family – and subsequently calculates a smaller diameter of 5.67 kilometers.

== Naming ==
This minor planet was named after Chinese astronomer and engineer Guo Shoujing (1231–1316) who lived during the Yuan Dynasty. He designed and constructed several astronomical instruments for precise observations and has been called the "Tycho Brahe of China". The official naming citation was published by the Minor Planet Center on 1 August 1978 (M.P.C. 4420).
