= Tianyi bao =

Chinese language anarchist magazine published in Japan (1907–1908)

- Categories: Anarchist publication
- Founder: Liu Shipei; He Zen
- Founded: 1907
- Final issue: 1908
- Country: Japan
- Based in: Tokyo
- Language: Chinese

Tianyi bao (Chinese: 天義報; Journal of Natural Justice) was an anarcho-feminist magazine which was published in Tokyo, Japan, for two years between 1907 and 1908. It was started by the Chinese exiles and closed down by the Government of Japan.

== History and profile ==
Tianyi bao was established in Tokyo by Liu Shipei and He Zen in 1907. The magazine featured articles written by a group of anarchists which is called the Tokyo anarchists, including Jing Meijiu. In contrast to the westernized Chinese anarchists in Paris this group much more firmly criticized imperialism and Western culture and supported feminism. They also adopted the views of Peter Kropotkin concerning the fusion of agriculture and industry in social organization and of mental and manual labor. The articles by He Zhen were mostly about her feminist project, and she argued that their goal was to destroy the old society and practice human equality. She supported not only women's revolution, but also racial, political and economic revolutions in her writings.

The magazine occasionally employed Esperanto, for instance, in the title of a photo of the French anarchist Élisée Reclus, and published the Esperanto anthem by L. L. Zamenhof. Liu Shipei also published an article about Esperanto.

Tianyi bao was banned by the Japanese authorities and ceased publication in 1908 immediately following the publication of a translation of the Communist Manifesto in January 1908. It was succeeded by another anarchist publication entitled Hengbao.
