= He-Yin Zhen =

Chinese feminist, anarchist, and revolutionary

- 何殷震
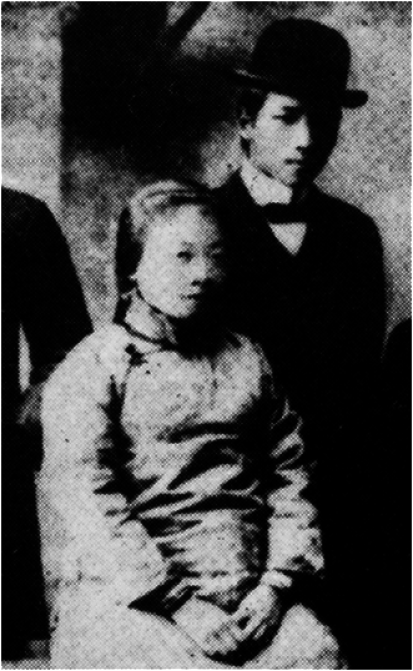
- He Zhen and Liu Shipei
- Born: He Ban; 1884; Yizheng, Jiangsu, Qing Empire
- Died: 1920 (aged 35–36); Republic of China
- Other name: Xiao Qi
- Occupation: Writer
- Spouse: Liu Shipei

Philosophical work
- Era: Modern
- Region: Chinese
- School: Anarchism; feminism
- Language: Chinese
- Notable works: On the Question of Women's Liberation

Chinese name
- Chinese: 何殷震
Transcriptions
Standard Mandarin
- Hanyu Pinyin: Héyīn Zhèn
- Wade–Giles: ho^{2} yin^{1} zhen^{4}
- Tongyong Pinyin: Héyīn Jhèn
- IPA: [xɤ̌.ín ʈʂə̂n]

He-Yin Zhen (Chinese: 何殷震; pinyin: Héyīn Zhèn, c. 1884 – c. 1920) was an early 20th-century Chinese feminist and anarchist.

She was born as He Ban in Yizheng, Jiangsu, but took the name He Zhen (何震, He "Thunderclap") when she married the noted scholar Liu Shipei in 1903. Despite this, she signed her published writings as He-Yin Zhen (何殷震) to include her mother's maiden name. She published a number of strong attacks in anarchist journals on male social power, arguing that society could not be free without the liberation of women.

== Biography ==
He-Yin was born into a prosperous Jiangsu family and received a good education in Confucian classics, despite being female. She married Liu Shipei in 1903 and moved with him to Shanghai where she continued her education at the Patriotic Women's School run by Cai Yuanpei.

She and Liu fled from the Manchu government to Tokyo in 1907, where she became an active member of a Chinese anarchist group and a major contributor to several journals. She contributed to Tianyi bao (Natural Justice), which published from 1907 to 1908, as well as to the Paris-based journal Xin Shiji (New Century or New Era), edited by the anarchist group led by Li Shizeng and Wu Zhihui. She and her husband both wrote under pen names, and many of her articles were misattributed to Liu.

He-Yin also founded the Women's Rights Recovery Association (Nüzi Fuquan Hui), which called for the use of force to end the male oppression of women, and advocates resistance to the ruling class and capitalists, while endorsing traditional values such as perseverance and respect for the larger community.

In 1909, after a falling-out with the conservative but strongly anti-Manchu scholar Zhang Taiyan, she and Liu returned to China to work with the Manchu government. After the 1911 Revolution, Liu worked with the new government and was a faculty member at Peking University.

The end of He-Yin's life remains uncertain. Following Liu's death from tuberculosis in 1919, there was a rumor that she became a Buddhist nun and ordained under the name Xiao Qi. However, there were also reports that she died of heartbreak or a mental disorder.

== Philosophy ==
He-Yin had a different approach to the "Women Question" and women's oppression that were raised in China in the late 19th century. She believed that gender and social class were inseparable, and analyzed the misery endured by Chinese women for millennia from the perspective of labor. She distinguished herself from contemporary feminist thinkers in that she considered anarchy the one condition in which women could be fully liberated. Unlike many of her contemporaries, such as Liang Qichao, who viewed the liberation of women as a means to revive China, He-Yin made resolving women's oppression her ultimate goal.

He-Yin's feminism was also formed through her critiques of capitalism, especially of inhumanity. In her opinion, women would never be free if capitalism persisted. This line of critique provided a logical and powerful philosophy against mainstream western feminism of the time, which prioritized women's suffrage as the ultimate liberation of women. He-Yin criticized not only the social forms women were subjected to but also the political and cultural suppression that limited the freedom of women.

=== Labor Theory ===
According to He-Yin, the organization of capital around the wage relation relied on less visible forms of social production, such as the unwaged reproductive labor in which women engaged. Approaching the concept of labor theory from a historical point of view, she argued that throughout history, Chinese women were relegated to closed quarters, such as the home and family, and prohibited from connecting with the outside world. They could not provide for themselves, which made them dependent on their husbands, and thus subject to their power and authority. She argued against male thinkers who denounced women for dependence on their husbands and their inferiority to men, criticizing their hypocrisy. She pointed out that since women were not allowed to leave their inner quarters, it was unthinkable for them to find a job to support themselves. Although lower-class women were part of the workforce, they were forced into labor because they had to subsidize their family income, thus whose labor was not viewed as their own production but something insignificant in a male-dominated society.

One popular proposal to solve the purported problem of women's lack of productivity was to call women into the labor force. However, He-Yin saw the flaws in this solution promulgated by male feminists of the time. She pointed out that under capitalism, women remained exploited even if they achieved professional independence in factories as workers or in offices as secretaries. In workplaces, women had to obey their superiors and follow orders since they depended on them for wages. The capitalist system put women into a situation where their work was undervalued: even if women received their full wages, the wages were still low to benefit the capitalists. Women would never rise up and earn a fair share in a capitalist society. He-Yin also observed that modern machinery reorganized technological knowledge that "Western skills are being transmitted as specializations in schools" but "poor women have no money for tuition." Ultimately, joining the labor force would not liberate women from their shackles, because regardless of their type of work, women's bodies and labor were still exploited.

He-Yin thus saw the solution for the "Women Question" as the liberation of the working class. Concerned with the commodification of women's bodies, she emphasized labor as an autonomous and free practice among humans, contrasted with its commodified model in classical and neoclassical political economy. Labor should represent both economic liberation and intellectual liberation, as women became free in their actions; however, in a capitalist society, women were commodified, with their bodies and labor being exploited for the benefit of others, over which they had no control. For He-Yin, labor was not only an economic concept but also a fundamental impact on human society. She refused the commoditization of labor, and insisted on seeing labor as a ontological concept rather than a mere economic concept. As long as a system of exploitation monopolized production, where women remained commodities dependent on society, "professional independence" remained "professional enslavement." Thus, to liberate women from their subjugation, He-Yin concluded that the capitalist system must be broken and a communal system must be established.

In her essay What Women Should Know About Communism, He-Yin described the communist society as one in which "the things required for eating, clothing, and daily use, will all be available in one place, and all, regardless of whether they be men or women, provided that they participate in work, will be able to take whatever they want, in whatever quantities, like collecting water from the ocean."

=== Anarchism ===
He-Yin also argued against any type of established government. He-Yin's anarchical ideas are evident in her criticism of the parliamentary governments of the west. She did not believe in the women's suffrage movement, although she praised suffragists for their courage. He-Yin cited the Norwegian women's suffrage movement as an example, arguing that since only women from a noble background or a wealthy family could become elected in the parliament, how could one ensure that the elected women would not act against their fellow women from the lower-class, and only act in favor of her fellow members of the upper-class?

He-Yin believed that electing women into office only added a third tier of suppression for working-class women, in addition to the oppression by men and by the government. For the same reason, she did not believe that leftist parties, such as the Social Democratic Party in the United States, would act in favor of the common people. Once they were in office, the governmental system would lure these leftist parties towards power and authority and neglect their fellow suppressed commoners, including working-class women. These leftist parties would diverge from their original goal of liberating the lower class and abolishing capitalism. He-Yin concluded that women's liberation could only be achieved through the action of the common people, without the intervention of the government. She provided as an example the working class in the United States who did not benefit even when the Social Democratic Party was elected, Let alone the women, who were barely represented in the party.

He-Yin did not agree with the agenda of many leftist parties or how they listed their end goals to be elected. She believed that without the government, men and women from the lower classes could focus on improving their livelihood instead of diverting their attention into other fields that interested the government and the upper classes.

Instead of endorsing participation in a society governed by bourgeois elections, He-Yin proposed an ideal communal society in which women and men were equal and shared the same responsibilities and production. Her ideal society would be similar to a socialist or communist country in the 21st century, but without a central government. In this ideal society, children would be brought up in "public child care facilities," therefore freeing women of their motherly duties and leveling the playing field for women do that they could assume responsibility equal to men. He-Yin also proposed that if men and women were raised and treated equally, and the responsibility assumed by both genders was equal as well, then the distinction between "men" and "women" would become unnecessary. Hence, neither men nor women would be oppressed by their duties. He-Yin attempted to rebuild a system where women could actively participate in society and have real power to decide their future. Her solution to gender inequality and the oppression of women was to liberate women from any form of oppression, including oppression by an established governmental system, regardless of its ideology.

Some recent scholars argue that He-Yin's anarcho-feminist arguments should not be separated from her political life in Tokyo, and modern portrayals of He-Yin as a pure anarcho-feminist could oversimplify her later political commitments and overlook her unstable political circumstances at the time. According to Deng, He-Yin's anarcho-feminist writings emerged mainly during a brief period, 1907-1908, when she and her husband Liu Shipei left the Revolutionary Alliance in China and joined socialist-anarchist communities in Japan. However, both He-Yin and her partner later abandoned anarchism and were viewed by contemporary revolutionists as counter-revolutionary. Deng argues that He-Yin's anarcho-feminist ideology could be shaped by the year she spent with the Tokyo socialist groups as well as the conflicts between the Revolutionary Alliance and the broader crisis of Qing politics. Thus, Deng believes that rather than viewing He-Yin as a feminist with lifelong commitments to anarchism, it is important to situate her thought within the unstable political environment of the late Qing dynasty.

=== Feminism ===
He-Yin's critique focused on two aspects of Chinese patriarchy at that time. First is directly against traditional Chinese Confucianism, which oppressed women for thousands of years in China's history. Traditional Chinese Confucianism defines women's duty and life purpose, which restrain women's basic human rights like working, attending imperial exams (Keju), studying, and equal domestic status. Other Chinese feminists at that time also upheld similar objections against Confucianism. The second aspect is against the resignification of women in late nineteenth- and early twentieth-century Chinese liberal feminist circles. Although society and most Chinese scholars at that time widely judged and rethought the flaws and backwardness of Confucianism, only women in the urban areas gained more rights to improve their social status and living condition. The resignification of women still did not equalize the power gap between men and women. In He-Yin's ideals. the true liberation had not been realized yet.

He-Yin's 1907 article On the Question of Women's Liberation sharply pointed out facts about marriage in China and the western world. She first mentioned that women in the western world have the freedom to divorce, get an education, and stay single. Apparently, women in the western world are free, but she defined such freedom as physical and unreal liberation. She emphasized that Chinese women's imitation and Chinese feminism that following the western path is wrong. She suggested that "吾决不望女子仅获伪自由、伪平等也，吾尤望女子取获真自由、真平等也" ("I absolutely do not want women to gain only false freedom and equality, I especially hope that women gain true freedom and true equality"). She closed the essay by writing, "Labor is a natural calling for women. But everyone, not just poor women. When labor is borne only by some poor women, then it is a kind of subservient labor. So, in our opinion, if there were the implementation of a system of communalized property, then everyone, whether man or woman, would labor equally..."

He-Yin also developed the idea of "男女" (nannü), which means "men and women" or "male and female". She refers to this term to describe the socially constructed hierarchy between men and women, not the biological difference, even though its name derives from the apparent division of the sexes. He-Yin stated in "On the Question of Women's Liberation" that “以為男女有別，乃天地之大經” ("For they considered the differentiation between man and woman to be one of the major principles in heaven and on earth"), that is, the political and moral institutions led by men first regarded the differentiation between men and women as natural and created this phrase. She argues in "The Feminist Manifesto" that nannü is not natural or inherent but created through history, customs, social norms, and education. According to He-Yin, nannü is the earliest form of inequality because the socially imposed separation of men and women creates a hierarchy that precedes other divisions, which produces further forms of oppression, such as authority relationships, access to resources, and social rules.

He-Yin believed women's liberation had to be achieved by women, not granted by men. She wrote that gender equality could not be achieved if women still depended on men for basic needs. She critiqued sex work and women's promiscuity as a response to gender inequality and oppression. While she understood that liberation could not be achieved immediately, she believed that it could never be achieved without the elimination of the commodification of women's bodies. She wrote in her 1907 writing "On the Question of Women's Liberation," "When liberation is mistaken for self-indulgence, a woman cannot think of a nobler task than sexual pleasure, not knowing that she might have fallen into prostitution unwittingly. These are some of the weaknesses of Chinese women." He-Yin wrote that this promiscuity of Chinese women may be a result of their long-term cloistering in the home.

He-Yin asserts that prostitution is incompatible with liberation. She observed how prostitutes waited on the streets at night for customers like "wild chickens" in the wind and snow. She wrote, "What are the reasons for this? It's because people with money take me and buy me, and I depend on this kind of business for eating." She writes in On the Question of Women's Liberation that women prostitute themselves to gain the favor of wealthier men, thus further enslaving themselves to both the power of men and money. The gratification which results from prostitution is granted by men and perpetuates wealth inequality and the dominance of men, which is why it cannot be a form of liberation. Ultimately, He-Yin was opposed to turning women into "tools for producing wealth".

== Influence ==
Most of He-Yin's feminist writings were written when she and her husband resided in Japan, and the influence of her feminism on the early Chinese feminist community is unclear. However, her feminist views were influential in the May Fourth movement, and were especially picked up by female communists. Her influence on the development of anarchism among Chinese scholars was also significant. Anarchism was first documented and introduced to the Chinese international students in Tokyo in the Japanese translations of western anarchical works. Chinese students in Japan adopted it as a solution to contemporary Chinese problems and sought a solution for China after the 1911 Revolution in China. Among the scholars developing their own understandings of anarchism was He-Yin. Her works, including articles in her journal, Tianyi bao, influenced the development of anarchism in China. Tianyi bao also published the first translation into Chinese of the Communist Manifesto. Her husband also supported the ideology, despite being closely engaged with the military personages of the warlords in China.

== Writings ==
Her essay On the Question of Women's Liberation, which appeared in Tianyi in 1907, opened by declaring that

"for thousands of years, the world has been dominated by the rule of man. This rule is marked by class distinctions over which men—and men only—exert proprietary rights. To rectify the wrongs, we must first abolish the rule of men and introduce equality among human beings, which means that the world must belong equally to men and women. The goal of equality cannot be achieved except through women's liberation."

"On The Question Of Women's Labor," published in Tianyi in July 1907, traces the exploitation of women's labor starting from the well field system of ancient China, especially decrying the tragedies of prostitution, female infanticide, and concubinage of recent times. "Economic Revolution And Women's Revolution" "On The Revenge Of Women," asks the women of her country: "has it occurred to you that men are our archenemy?" "On Feminist Antimilitarism," and "The Feminist Manifesto" were also powerful indictments of male social power.

"On Feminist Antimilitarism", originally published in 1907, He-Yin addressed the importance of women protesting against militarism. He-Yin used the burst of antimilitarism during the early 20th century in Southern Europe and the example of the revolutions taking place without antimilitarism to propel it foreword. She advocates that since the military are strongly armed, these revolutions are too difficult, as they can be put down by the army. She even said: "If we examine the past we see that troops are good for nothing but rape, kidnapping, looting, and murder" to defend her view that antimilitarism benefited all, since the military was responsible for major atrocities in China. In this essay He-Yin quoted a poem by musician Cai Wenji to depict the ongoing carnage faced by women who were captured by the invaders. Often, these women committed suicide. If women were able to escape this fate, they often lost their sons, mourned their husbands and suffered as their household was ruined. Furthermore, the fate of capture was unavoidable for many Chinese and it wasn't limited in its scope. All women were at risk regardless of their social class or lineage.

"Ever since [Japan] began deploying troops in recent years, the number of prostitutes In the country has been growing by the day".

He-Yin correlated militarism and prostitution, as wives were faced with the loss of their sons and husbands with little compensation. This left them to face the difficulty of providing for themselves, leading them to have to prostitute themselves. He-Yin also addressed the tragedies women faced as households were separated and brought together again by loss, particularly using poems to illustrate the sentiments of Chinese writers who had faced these tragedies.

In "Economic Revolution and Women's Revolution", published in 1907 in Tianyi, He-Yin argued that women's oppression is rooted in the economic structure. He-Yin believes that to achieve the true liberation of women, economic revolution is necessary. She stated that domination is not based solely on culture or ideology, but on the entire system of financial distribution. She argued that because men hold the majority of property, domination is therefore produced, and women are dependent on the material resources of men. Thus, women have to exchange their bodies and domestic labor for capital. He-Yin uses the notion of “共產制度” ("communal system") to illustrate the time when women had no dependence on men and their property because property was communal. According to He-Yin, when people accumulated property, inequality arose; men gained power from that property, and people without property could only sell their labor and bodies for exchange. She related women's dependency on men to marriage, which nowadays is no longer for love but for money. She argued that marriage turned women into domestic slaves and one of the properties of men. In this system, marriage functioned as an economic transaction rather than an expression of love. He-Yin suggested that reforming the education system is not enough, but the abolition of private property and the patriarchal family system. She believed that because money controlled power, the only way to resolve the problem was to create a system without private property. Therefore, marriage would stop being a transaction between women and men, turning into a combination of two loved ones.

Within "The Feminist Manifesto", also published in 1907, He-Yin tackled the institution of marriage as a root source of the inequalities between man and woman. She noted that marriage was a symbol of strength for men, as the more wives he possessed, the more respected he was. This encouraged men to marry and have many concubines. He-Yin also addressed the inequality between "wife" and "husband". While men could marry many women, women were only ever socially expected to have one husband: "Once a woman becomes a man's wife, she remains so for life". This developed the idea that women must follow their husbands since they could not be whole without them, and created the illusion that her husband was her heaven. To begin to be liberated and equal to men, women should strive for monogamous marriage. Women should NOT take their husbands' surnames, and parents should value their sons and daughters equally. Daughters and sons should be raised without discrimination, and if couples were struggling, they should be able to separate. Those who remarried should only marry someone who had previously married. First-time marriages should be limited to people who had not been married. She wanted to abolish all brothels and relieve prostitutes.

He-Yin then addressed objections that might be made to her proposals:

- Since women give birth, they are by nature different than men in their labor and capabilities. He-Yin responded that she was not limiting herself to a women's revolution, but instead a complete social revolution. As a result, public child care facilities would raise the child after its birth.
- There are more women than men, so it cannot be expected that everyone would have only one spouse. He-Yin responded that women did not go to war and since men died in war, the numbers were actually skewed. If her social revolution took place, she said, the numbers would adjust themselves.

== Tianyi bao: Anarchist journal ==
Tianyi bao, first published in Tokyo, Japan in 1907, is often considered the first anarchist journal in the Chinese language. Unlike other feminist journals at the time, which saw women's education as a means to contribute to the nation, Tianyi Bao argues that women's oppression is rooted in patriarchal structure and private property and that the true women's liberation lies in the reformation of social structure and the destruction of private property, not just educational improvement. Tianyi Bao stands out because it suggests that the entire social order needs to be overturned, not just the calling for rights within the existing social structure, with the abolition of the family as the priority. He-Yin partnered with her husband, Chinese anarchist and activist Liu Shipei, to publish the journal. In it, many anarchists, including He-Yin herself, published articles challenging early 20th century values. He-Yin edited the journal as well. The journal itself was antigovernment and heavily influenced by questions regarding women and their roles in society. Many other topics were addressed that particularly encouraged revolution. The founder of Tianyi Bao argued that social revolution needs "the destruction of established society and the realization of human equality," a goal that includes not only women's revolution but also racial, political, and economic revolutions. He-Yin is often considered to have encouraged the radicalism that occurred post-publication, as her writings were interpreted as radicalized. She was also one of the few feminist writers at the time who wrote from a female perspective. During the early 20th century, many of the feminist writers of Chinese society were men, which made He-Yin's perspective much more radical, as she advocated reform through complete overturn of government and capitalist systems. Throughout the years however, He-Yin published fewer articles in Tianyi bao, but these articles, in addition to her own published essays, are some of the few accounts credibly written on He-Yin's behalf. Underneath He-Yin's guidance and publication, it was heavily concerned with feminism, but as He-Yin began to publish less, the journal soon became more geared to anarchism.

But despite He-Yin's attempt to balance anarchism and feminism, the journal soon focused on anarchism. This also demonstrated the overall change in Chinese society, which at first focused on addressing women's roles in society, but soon became more interested in anarchy and government institutions, and preventing Asia from falling into the western Capitalist model.

== Bibliography ==
- Cairns, Daniel (2011). "He Zhen (Late 19th Century – ?". In Ness, Immanuel (ed.). The International Encyclopedia of Revolution and Protest. Wiley. p. 1. doi:10.1002/9781405198073.wbierp1780. ISBN 9781405198073. OCLC 8682026027.
- Dirlik, Arif (1986). "Vision and Revolution: Anarchism in Chinese Revolutionary Thought on the Eve of the 1911 Revolution". Modern China. 12 (2): 123–165. doi:10.1177/009770048601200201. ISSN 0097-7004. JSTOR 189118. S2CID 144785666.
- George, Abosede (May 2015). "He-Yin Zhen, Oyewumi, and Geographies of Anti-Universalism". Comparative Studies of South Asia, Africa and the Middle East. 35 (1): 183–188. doi:10.1215/1089201X-2876200. ISSN 1089-201X.
- Hershatter, Gail (2019). Women and China's revolutions. Lanham, Maryland: Rowman & Littlefield. pp. 83–86. ISBN 978-1-4422-1569-6. OCLC 1047569427.
- Huiying, Liu (December 2003). "Feminism: An Organic or an Extremist Position? On Tien Yee As Represented by He Zhen". Positions: East Asia Cultures Critique. 11 (3): 779–800. doi:10.1215/10679847-11-3-779. ISSN 1067-9847. OCLC 474696624.
- Karl, Rebecca E. (2012). "Feminism in Modern China". Journal of Modern Chinese History. 6 (2): 235–255. doi:10.1080/17535654.2012.738873. ISSN 1753-5654. OCLC 5815370927. S2CID 143681517.
- Liu, Lydia He; Karl, Rebecca E.; Ko, Dorothy, eds. (2013). "He-Yin Zhen". The Birth of Chinese Feminism: Essential Texts in Transnational Theory. Columbia University Press. pp. 51–184. ISBN 978-0-231-16291-3. JSTOR 10.7312/liu-16290. OCLC 830169912.
  - He-Yin, Zhen (2013a). "On the Question of Women's Liberation". In Liu, Lydia He; Karl, Rebecca E.; Ko, Dorothy (eds.). The Birth of Chinese Feminism: Essential Texts in Transnational Theory. Columbia University Press. pp. 53–71. ISBN 978-0-231-16291-3.
  - He-Yin, Zhen (2013b). "On the Question of Women's Labor". In Liu, Lydia He; Karl, Rebecca E.; Ko, Dorothy (eds.). The Birth of Chinese Feminism: Essential Texts in Transnational Theory. Columbia University Press. pp. 72–91. ISBN 978-0-231-16291-3.
  - He-Yin, Zhen (2013c). "The Feminist Manifesto". In Liu, Lydia He; Karl, Rebecca E.; Ko, Dorothy (eds.). The Birth of Chinese Feminism: Essential Texts in Transnational Theory. Columbia University Press. pp. 179–184. ISBN 978-0-231-16291-3.
- Qiao, Zhihang (2012). "Imagining a different future: anarchist equality and the form of labour in the Journal of Natural Justice". Frontiers of History in China. 7 (3): 376–403. doi:10.3868/s020-001-012-0020-8 (inactive 12 July 2025). ISSN 1673-3401. OCLC 5672435771.
- Sudo, Mizuyo; Hill, Michael G. (2006). "Concepts of Women's Rights in Modern China". Gender & History. 18 (3): 472–489. doi:10.1111/j.1468-0424.2006.00452.x. ISSN 0953-5233. OCLC 5287732995. S2CID 144587204.
- Zarrow, Peter (1988). "He Zhen and Anarcho-Feminism in China" (PDF). Journal of Asian Studies. 47 (4): 796–813. doi:10.2307/2057853. ISSN 0021-9118. JSTOR 2057853. OCLC 5545373666. S2CID 155072159.
