= Hong Liangji =

Qing dynasty scholar and politician

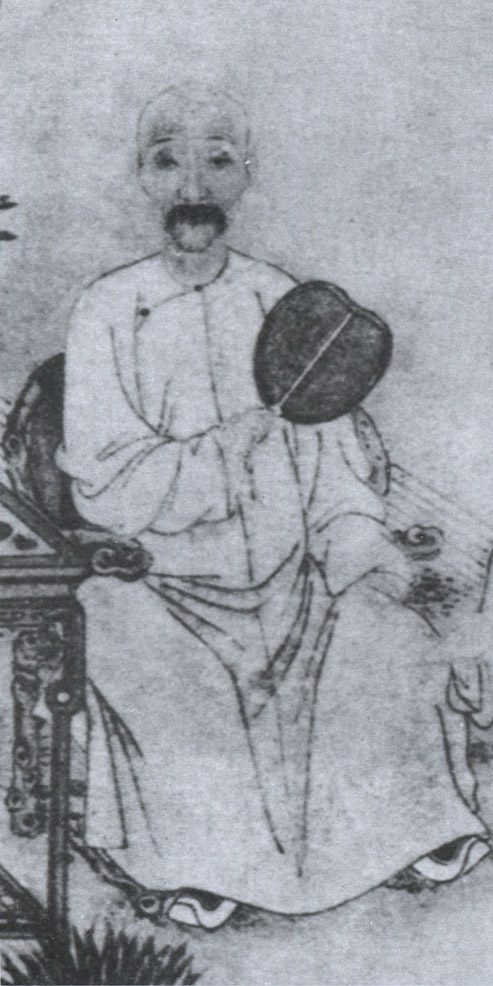
Hong Liangji

Hong Liangji (Chinese: 洪亮吉; pinyin: Hóng Liàngjí; Wade–Giles: Hung Liang-chi, 1746–1809), courtesy names Junzhi (君直) and Zhicun (稚存), was a Qing Chinese scholar, statesman, political theorist, and philosopher. He was most famous for his critical essay to the Qianlong Emperor, which resulted in his banishment to Yili in Xinjiang. In modern times, he is best remembered for his essay Zhi Ping Pian (治平篇, "On Governance and Well-being of the Empire") on population growth and its sociopolitical consequence, in which he raised many of the same issues that were raised by Malthus writing during the same period in England.

== Life ==
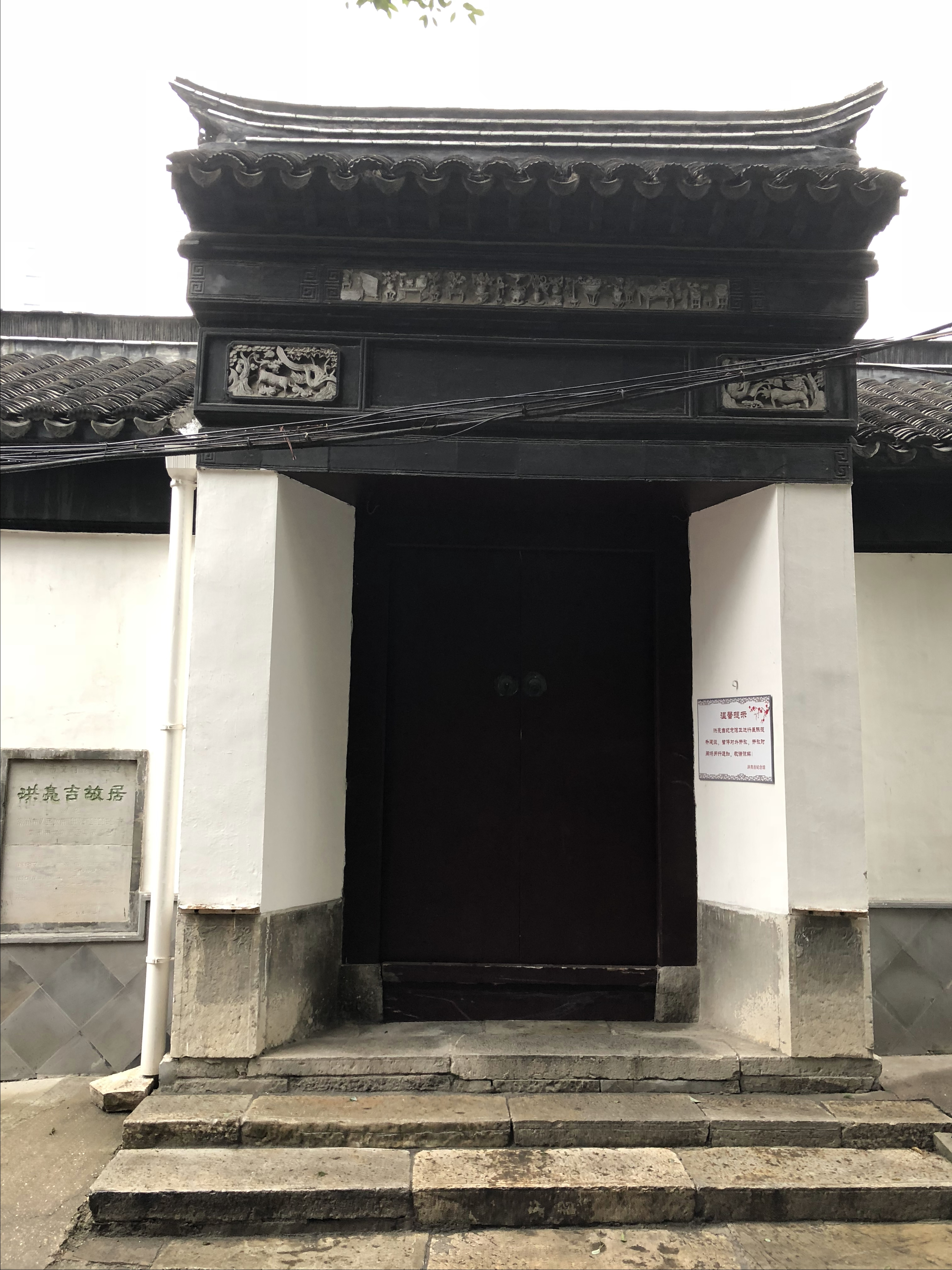
Former Residence of Hong Liangji in Changzhou

Hong was born in Changzhou and accomplished of the rank of jinshi, which he at the age of 44. He held minor government posts up until his criticism of the Qianlong Emperor in the early nineteenth century which focused on the emperor's failure to weed out corrupt officials like Heshen or reform the bureaucracy that had allowed Heshen to secure power. Although well-intentioned and meant to serve as a call to action, the punishment for his transgression was originally decapitation, and subsequently lessened to banishment to Ili by the successive Jiaqing Emperor. Later, the emperor once more commuted Hong's sentence and pardoned him completely in 1800.

== Philosophy ==
Hong was a proponent of the New Text scholarship, and felt that political remonstrance was part of his Confucian duty, as many other philosophers of his time did. He was concerned with such issues as population control, geography, the Chinese classics, and government corruption. He critically re-evaluated the common Chinese assumption that a growing population was the sign of a good government.

=== Zhi Ping Pian and theory on population growth ===
Hong's time experienced one of the fastest expansions of population in Chinese history. With the promotion of New World crops such as corn and sweet potato, Chinese population tripled from 100 million (1651–1661) to 300 million (1790). The population boom resulted in a series of socioeconomic problems, and caused concerns among the Mandarins. In 1791, Qianlong Emperor expressed his worry to the court officials that the resources might not be able to support the growing population. Two years later, Hong published Zhi Ping Pian, the 26th essay of his anthology Opinions (意言).

In Zhi Ping Pian, Hong points to the tension between the growth of the means of subsistence and the growing population. He writes that the tension would be relieved by disasters, famine, and plagues.

"Speaking of households, the number of which ... there are 20 times more than a hundred years ago ... Some people may propose that there would be wild land to cultivate and spare space for housing. But they can only be doubled or tripled, or at most increased five times, whereas the population at the same time could be ten to twenty times larger. Therefore housing and crop fields tend to be in scarcity, while the population tends to be excessive at all time. Given the fact that some households become monopolists, there is no wonder that so many have suffered cold and hunger and even died here and there ... How does Heaven deal with the tension? Flood, drought, and pestilence are the means of Heaven to temper the problem."

Hong points out that government can mediate the problem by policies like adjusting tax, encouraging colonization, and enhancing the social safety net. However, he expresses his concern about the limits of human policy in addressing such an inherent structural dilemma.

== Works ==
Hong was a prolific writer, with more than 20 books published, including multiple volumes of essays, prose works and poems. In addition to his philosophical works, Hong was also a noted historian, known for his study of historical geography.

- Letter to Prince Cheng Earnestly Discussing the Political Affairs of the Time, 1799
- Opinions, 1793
