= Women's Rights Recovery Association =

The Women's Rights Recovery Association (simplified Chinese: 女子复权会; traditional Chinese: 女子復權會; pinyin: Nǚzǐ fùquán huì) was a Tokyo-based political movement founded in 1907, by anti-Qing members of the Chinese diaspora. It was an anarcha-feminist group, one of the earliest Chinese organizations adhering to anarchism and feminism alike. The Association, which opposed the Qing dynasty and Confucianism, advocated the end of male privileges in traditional Chinese culture, and prohibited female submission to men. Its members were forbidden to become concubines or secondary wives. In return, it promised to help all members in their fight against individual and societal oppression.

Ideologically left-wing, unlike others at the time in China, the Women's Rights Recovery Association identified the cause of women's oppression as the economic systems of feudalism and capitalism, rather than in a perceived weakness in national character and culture. Most of its ideology was formulated by its founder, He-Yin Zhen – a Jiangsu-born anarchist, who had gone into Japanese exile together with her husband Liu Shipei. She also published the newspaper Natural Justice, and contributed to the Paris-based Xin Shiji. Unusually for her time she focused on the exploitation of the class-based exploitation of women, singling out prostitutes, domestic servants and female factory workers as the most oppressed. She condemned the unequal distribution of wealth, and refused to subordinate this women's class struggle to any other ideological cause. Writing that "the goal of equality cannot be achieved except through women's liberation", He-Yin – and the Association – viewed female freedom as something that women must accomplish on their own, since no one would give them their rights. Revolutionary change, not reform, was seen as the only way forward.

While little is known about the exact workings of the Women's Rights Recovery Association, it is probable that the group was dissolved after He-Yin Zhen and her husband left Tokyo in 1909, returning to China.

== See also ==
- Anarchism in China
- Anarchism in Japan
- Feminism in China
- Feminism in Japan
- Xinhai Revolution
