= Shisan Jing Zhushu =

Qing dynasty collection of Chinese literature

The Shisan Jing Zhushu (Chinese: 十三經注疏) is a famous Qing dynasty collection, edited by the scholar Ruan Yuan (Chinese: 阮元) (1764–1849) of the Thirteen Classics of Chinese literature, comparing many editions of each book, together with scholars' commentaries on the books. Ruan Yuan's version, considered the most careful, was originally published in 1815 and has been reprinted many times subsequently.

== Overview ==
The Qing dynasty series Shisanjing zhushu 十三經注疏 (Commentaries and Subcommentaries on the Thirteen Confucian Classics) contains the following commentaries (zhu 注) and subcommentaries (shu 疏):

Work	Commentary (zhu)	Commentator	Subcommentary (shu)	Subcommentator	Combined Title
Zhouyi 周易	Zhouyi zhu 周易注	(Cao Wei) Wang Bi (226–249, guayaoci, tuan, xiang, wenyan 卦爻辭、彖、象、文言) (Eastern Jin) Han Kangbo (c.335–c.385, xici, shuogua, xugua, zagua 繫辭、說卦、序卦、雜掛)	Zhouyi zhengyi 周易正義	(Tang) Kong Yingda (574–648, lead editor)	Zhouyi zhushu 周易注疏
Shangshu 尚書	Guwen Shangshu zhuan 古文尚書傳	(Western Han) Kong Anguo (title)	Shangshu zhengyi 尚書正義	(Tang) Kong Yingda (lead editor)	Shangshu zhushu 尚書注疏
Maoshi 毛詩	Maoshi zhuan jian 毛詩傳箋	(Western Han) Mao Heng (traditional commentary) (Eastern Han) Zheng Xuan (127–200, Maoshi jian)	Maoshi zhengyi 毛詩正義	(Tang) Kong Yingda (lead editor)	Maoshi zhushu 毛詩注疏
Zhouli 周禮	Zhouli zhu 周禮注	(Eastern Han) Zheng Xuan	Zhouli shu 周禮疏	(Tang) Jia Gongyan	Zhouli zhushu 周禮注疏
Yili 儀禮	Yili zhu 儀禮注	(Eastern Han) Zheng Xuan	Yili shu 儀禮疏	(Tang) Jia Gongyan	Yili zhushu 儀禮注疏
Liji 禮記	Liji zhu 禮記注	(Eastern Han) Zheng Xuan	Liji zhengyi 禮記正義	(Tang) Kong Yingda (lead editor)	Liji zhushu 禮記注疏
Zuozhuan 左傳 (with Chunqiu 春秋)	Chunqiu jingzhuan jijie 春秋經傳集解	(Western Jin) Du Yu (222–285)	Chunqiu zhengyi 春秋正義	(Tang) Kong Yingda (lead editor)	Chunqiu Zuozhuan zhushu 春秋左傳注疏
Gongyang zhuan 公羊傳	Chunqiu jingzhuan jiegou 春秋經傳解詁	(Eastern Han) He Xiu (129–182)	Chunqiu Gongyang shu 春秋公羊疏	(Tang) Xu Yan	Chunqiu Gongyang zhuan zhushu 春秋公羊傳注疏
Guliang zhuan 穀梁傳	Chunqiu Guliang zhuan jijie 春秋穀梁傳集解	(Eastern Jin) Fan Ning (339–401)	Chunqiu Guliang shu 春秋穀梁疏	(Tang) Yang Shixun	Chunqiu Guliang zhuan zhushu 春秋穀梁傳注疏
Xiaojing 孝經	Xiaojing zhu 孝經注	(Tang) Emperor Xuanzong (685–762)	Xiaojing zhengyi 孝經正義	(Northern Song) Xing Bing (932–1010, lead editor)	Xiaojing zhushu 孝經注疏
Lunyu 論語	Lunyu jijie 論語集解	(Cao Wei) He Yan (c.195–249, lead editor)	Lunyu shu 論語疏	(Northern Song) Xing Bing (lead editor)	Lunyu zhushu 論語注疏
Erya 爾雅	Erya zhu 爾雅注	(Jin) Guo Pu (276–324)	Erya shu 爾雅疏	(Northern Song) Xing Bing (lead editor)	Erya zhushu 爾雅注疏
Mengzi 孟子	Mengzi zhangju 孟子章句	(Eastern Han) Zhao Qi (108–201)	Mengzi zhengyi 孟子正義	(Northern Song) Sun Shi (title)	Mengzi zhushu 孟子注疏

== Bibliography ==
- Shisanjing zhushu 十三經注疏, Zhonghua shuju 1980 (2 vols.)
- Shisanjing suoyin 十三經索引. Zhonghua shuju 1983 (Index)
