= Kaozheng =

School of textual criticism in Qing China

Kaozheng (Chinese: 考證; lit. 'search for evidence'), alternatively called kaoju xue (考據學; 'evidential scholarship') was a Chinese school of thought emphasizing philology that was active during the Qing dynasty (1644–1912) from c. 1600 to 1850. It was most prominent during the reigns of the Qianlong Emperor and Jiaqing Emperor; because of this, it is often also referred to as the Qian–Jia school (乾嘉學派). Their approach corresponds to that of modern textual criticism, and was also associated with empiricism as regards scientific topics.

== History and controversies ==
Nearly all of the representatives of the kaozheng movement were Ming loyalists, refusing to accept offers of government positions from the Qing dynasty. The Kaozheng school began in the late Ming, criticizing the subjectivism of Yangmingism. After the fall of the Ming, kaozheng scholars blamed this subjectivism for the collapse of the state and thus called for practical study of objective realities to replace subjectivism, directly leading to critical studies of the Confucian source texts for their original meanings. Some of the most important first generation of Qing thinkers were Ming loyalists, at least in their hearts, including Gu Yanwu, Huang Zongxi, and Fang Yizhi. Partly in reaction to the presumed laxity and excess of the late Ming, they turned to kaozheng, or evidential learning, which emphasized careful textual study and critical thinking. The kaozheng movement has been compared to the European phenomena of Historism, Enlightenment, or Biblical criticism, seeking reform and deconstruction of royal-centric and optimistic narratives by "returning to the sources" through source criticism. The kaozheng movement was also closely linked to the Han learning movement which sought to reject Neo-Confucianism for the Han dynasty commentarial tradition.

The kaozheng movement was centered around the Jiangnan area. Rather than regarding kaozheng as a local phenomenon around Jiangnan and Beijing, it has been proposed to view it as a general trend in development of Chinese scholarship in light of contribution of Cui Shu (1740–1816). The movement began to lose momentum in the late 18th-century, but not before triggering the rise of New Text Confucianism and the statecraft (經世; jingshi) movements, which criticized the original kaozheng scholarship while adopting its critical methods.

Towards the end of the Qing and in the early 20th century, reform scholars such Liang Qichao, Hu Shih and Gu Jiegang saw in kaozheng a step towards development of empirical mode of scholarship and science in China. Conversely, Carsun Chang and Xu Fuguan criticized kaozheng as intellectually sterile and politically dangerous.

While the late 20th-century scholar Yu Ying-shih has tried to demonstrate continuity between kaozheng and neo-Confucianism in order to provide a non-revolutionary basis for Chinese culture, Benjamin Elman has argued that kaozheng constituted "an empirical revolution" that broke with the stance of neo-Confucian combination of teleological considerations with scholarship.

=== Influence in Japan ===
The methods of kaozheng were imported into Edo-era Japan as kōshō or kōshōgaku. This approach combined textual criticism and empiricism in an effort to find the ancient, original meanings of texts. The earliest use of kaozheng methods in Edo Japan was Keichū's critical edition of the Man'yōshū. These methods were eventually used by the Kokugaku to argue that modern science was indigenous to Japan; they also contributed to the Kokugaku critique of Buddhism.

== See also ==
- Dai Zhen
- Changzhou School of Thought
- Han learning
