= New Text School =

School of thought in Confucianism

New Text School (traditional Chinese: 今文經學; simplified Chinese: 今文经学; pinyin: Jīn Wén Jīngxué) of Confucianism was based on Confucian classics recompiled in the early Han dynasty by Confucians who survived the burning of books and burying of scholars during the Qin dynasty. The survivors wrote the classics in the contemporary characters of their time, and these texts were later dubbed as "New Text School" (because they were written in the script in use during the Han dynasty). The New Text School attained prominence in the Western Han dynasty and became the official interpretation for Confucianism, which was adopted as the official ideology by Emperor Wu of Han.

Represented by Confucians such as Dong Zhongshu, this school advocated a holistic interpretation of Confucian classics and viewed Confucius as a charismatic, visionary prophet, a sage who deserved the Mandate of Heaven but did not attain kingship due to circumstances. The school competed with Old Text School in the later Han dynasty, and its dominance waned as the latter became the new orthodoxy. The school fell into obscurity during the chaotic period after the fall of the Han dynasty and remained so until the late Ming dynasty in the 17th century.

The school was reinvigorated by a group of scholars who were dissatisfied with the popular Neo-Confucianism at the time in the late Ming dynasty. The movement gained momentum in the eighteenth century with the rise of the Changzhou School of Thought. It became a major intellectual trend in Chinese philology and political ideology. As formulated by B. Elman, it was intended to offer a solution to the crisis of confidence between the Chinese state and its gentry constituency in the transition from the Qianlong era to the Jiaqing era in the Qing dynasty.

== Ideological features ==
The New Text School focuses on the philosophical and metaphysical meaning of the Confucian texts, using an apocryphal and prognostic approach to the reading. This was criticised by the rival Old Text School as superstitious, as the Old Text School favoured reading them from a historical perspective. The New Text School viewed Confucius as an uncrowned king (su wang) while the Old Text School viewed him as a teacher of ancient knowledge.

=== Qing dynasty ===
The scholar Zhuang Cunyu (1718–1788), a secretary to the Qianlong emperor, was the pioneer of the Changzhou New Text School revival. Dissatisfied with his apolitical colleagues in the Han learning movement, Zhuang published studies based on the New Text literature, aiming to interpret the writings of Confucius' as prescriptions on government, especially with regard to the corruption and lawlessness of his contemporaries. Using the evidential research methods of Han learning, this school of thought sought to interpret moral and political lessons from the Confucian classics, so as to create a legitimate framework to combat the political corruption of the time.

- Downplaying the role of Mencius, as a sign of opposition to Confucianism during the Song dynasty.
- Much attention paid to the Gongyang Zhuan as the text revealing the true wisdom of Confucius. The reading of Chunqiu therein had prophetic overtones, which the opponents of the school condemned as superstition.
- High esteem of the work of He Xiu (何休), the Han dynasty author of the commentary to the Gongyang Zhuan (春秋公羊解詁).
- Attacks on the Zuo Zhuan as a purported Liu Xin's fabrication intended to overturn the Gongyang Zhuan.

By far the most important feature of the New Text as political movement was advocating reform (Zhuang Cunyu, Liu Fenglu), drawing from the Gongyang legalist-style ideology of "weighing the circumstances". The reforms were seen necessary since the Heshen-related crisis of power. According to Wei Yuan 魏源 (1794–1857),

"The ancients had what pertained to the ancients. To force the ancients upon the moderns is to misrepresent the moderns. To use the moderns as the standard for the ancients is to misrepresent the ancients. If one misrepresents the present, then there can be no way to order [the contemporary world]... If one read the [medical] works of the Yellow Emperor and Shennong, and used them to kill people, one would be labelled a mediocre doctor. If one read the works of the Duke of Zhou and Confucius and used them to harm the empire, would one not be labelled a mediocre Confucian? Not only would such [incompetence] bring no benefit to any particular age, but in addition it would cause people no longer to believe in the Way of the sages."

== Scholarly genealogies ==
- Zhuang Cunyu (1719–1788), grandfather of
- Liu Fenglu, mentor of
- Wei Yuan (1794–1857) and Gong Zizhen (1792–1841);
- Kang Youwei

== See also ==
- Old Text School
- Gongyang Zhuan

== Literature ==
- Elman, Benjamin A. Classicism, politics, and kingship: the Chang-chou school of New Text Confucianism in late imperial China. Berkeley: University of California Press, 1990.
