= Liu Shipei =

Chinese scholar

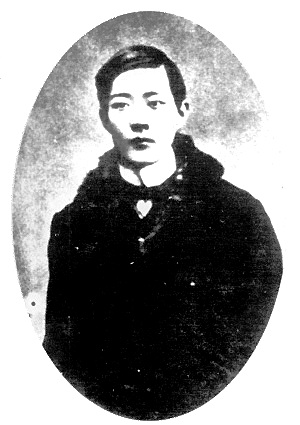
- Born: 24 June 1884; Yizheng, Jiangsu
- Died: 20 December 1919 (aged 35); Beijing, China
- Other name: 申叔 Shenshu
- Education: Traditional Chinese
- Occupations: Educator; political activist
- Spouse: He Zhen 何震

Liu Shipei
- Traditional Chinese: 劉師培
- Simplified Chinese: 刘师培
Transcriptions
Standard Mandarin
- Hanyu Pinyin: Liú Shīpéi
- Wade–Giles: Liu^{2} Shih^{1}-p'ei^{2}
- IPA: [ljǒʊ ʂɨ́pʰěɪ]

Liu Shipei (Chinese: 劉師培; 24 June 1884 – 20 December 1919) was a philologist, Chinese anarchist, and revolutionary activist. While he and his wife, He Zhen were in exile in Japan he became a fervent nationalist. He then saw the doctrines of anarchism as offering a path to social revolution while remaining intent on preserving China's cultural essence, especially Taoism and the records of China's pre-imperial history. In 1909 he unexpectedly returned to China to work for the Manchu Qing government and after 1911 supported Yuan Shikai's attempt to become emperor. After Yuan's death in 1916 he joined the faculty at Peking University. He died of tuberculosis in 1919.

== Career ==
Liu came from a family of prominent Qing dynasty scholars and officials. His father, uncle, grandfather, and great-grandfather were prominent in the school of Han learning which grounded their political reforms in study of the classics. They felt an affinity with such early Qing figures as Wang Fuzhi and the School of Evidential Scholarship. Early family education gave him the philological tools needed to study ancient texts, especially the Zuozhuan, a rich chronicle of pre-imperial China. Liu passed the first and second levels of the imperial examinations, but when he did not succeed at the highest level, he instead went to live in Shanghai in 1902–1904. There he met the revolutionaries Zhang Binglin and Cai Yuanpei and published essays calling for driving the Manchus out of China. He took the name GuangHan (光漢), or "Restore the Han," and developed the doctrine of guocui (Chinese: 國粹), or "national essence," which set out to reinvigorate China through the study of classical culture before Confucius. He edited the journal Guocui xuebao (國粹學報, National Essence), which published essays from many prominent revolutionary scholars.

Exile in Japan became necessary to avoid government suppression. In Tokyo, Liu and his wife, He Zhen, joined a group of revolutionaries who became convinced of the doctrines of anarchism. The historian Peter Zarrow calls Liu and Wu Zhihui, who led an anarchist group in Paris, "the most important Chinese theorists of anarchism." Since Tokyo was closer to China, Liu's publications, including Tianyi bao, public debates, and organizing made him the more influential of the two at home. The two groups shared basic anarchist premises: that revolution had to be social, not just political, that it had to be based on moral principle, and that education was the most important tool in carrying it out. They also agreed in condemning the class and gender hierarchy in China's heritage. Major differences soon emerged, however. The Paris group tended to see anarchism as rational and scientific progress, while Liu and the group in Tokyo were less interested in technology and progress. They respected Taoist laissez-faire thinkers who opposed government intervention in society. Liu's wife, He Zhen, contributed much to the journal may have been more radical than Liu himself.

In 1909, Liu suddenly returned to China to work for Duanfang, a highly placed Manchu official. Duanfang was killed when the revolution broke out in 1911, but Liu escaped to Chengdu, and engaged in teaching. Yuan Shikai appointed him to the National Assembly in 1915, and he was in the group of the "Six Gentlemen" who first called upon Yuan to become emperor. After Yuan's death, Liu moved to Tianjin, then his old friend Cai Yuanpei, who had become president of Peking University, invited him to become a professor. He died of tuberculosis in December 1919 at the age of 35.

== Works ==
=== The Yellow Emperor Chronology ===
Among Liu's lasting contributions was his 1903 creation of the Yellow Emperor Chronology to calculate the chronology of Chinese history. There is no evidence that this calendar was used before Liu. Chinese years were traditionally based on the year of the emperor's rule, which of course was offensive to those who wanted to overthrow the imperial system, while the Gregorian (or Western) calendar, which used the birth of Jesus, did not appeal to those who resented western imperialism. Convinced of the unbroken continuity of the Han race and Han culture from earliest times, Liu used his learning and philological training to compute the year in which the Yellow Emperor's reign began, which he determined to be 2711 BC. Liu calculated, for instance, that the international expedition sent in 1900 to suppress the Boxer Uprising entered Beijing in the 4611th year of the Yellow Emperor. This was the 庚子 (Gēngzǐ) year in the sixty-year cycle and year 26 of the Guangxu reign. Liu's system is used in Chinese publications most often alongside but not replacing the western calendar as the civil calendar.

=== Others ===
Liu's 1908 essay Concerning the Desirability of an Association of the Laboring Masses in China observed that the capitalists had gradually taken over traditional peasant industries. Among other examples, Liu noted that weaving and cloth companies had set up technologically advanced operations in treaty ports, producing goods quicker and cheaper than peasant textiles and therefore peasants found their markets diminished. As Liu described it, this process destroyed the social relations of the countryside, destroyed traditional peasant industries, and prompted peasant migration to the cities for capitalist wage labor.

In his 1908 essay Concerning the Possibility of Implementing a Unified System of Agriculture and Industry in China, Liu described this process as breaking traditional connections between industry and agriculture: "in past days industry was largely amalgamated with agricultural production, and yet today agriculture and industry have become bifurcated from one another."

== Sources ==
- Angle, Stephen C (1998). "Did Someone Say" Rights"? Liu Shipei's Concept of Quanli". Philosophy East and West. 48 (4): 623–651. doi:10.2307/1400020. JSTOR 1400020.
- Bernal, Martin (1976), "Liu Shih-p'ei and National Essence", in Furth; Charlotte (eds.), The Limits of Change: Essays on Conservative Alternatives in Republican China, Cambridge, MA: Harvard University Press, pp. 90–112, ISBN 0674534239
- "Liu Shi-p'ei," in Boorman, Howard L. (1968). Richard Howard (ed.). Biographical Dictionary of Republican China. Vol. II. New York: Columbia University Press., pp. 411–413.
- Cohen, Alvin (2012). "Brief Note: The Origin of the Yellow Emperor Era Chronology" (PDF). Asia Major. 25 (pt 2): 1–13. Archived from the original (PDF) on 2020-08-01.
- Dikötter, Frank (1992), The Discourse of Race in Modern China, London: Hurst & Co., ISBN 1-85065-135-3
- Dirlik, Arif (1991). Anarchism in the Chinese Revolution. Berkeley: University of California Press. ISBN 0520072979.
- Hürter, Jens (2003). "The Fountainhead of All Learned Tradition: Liu Shipei's Treatise on the Official Scribe and Its Significance for Chinese Culture" (PDF). Oriens Extremus. 44. Archived from the original (PDF) on 2014-12-25.
- Joachim Kurtz. Disciplining the National Essence: Liu Shipei and the Reinvention of Ancient China's Intellectual History, in Benjamin Ellman and Jing Tsu, (ed.), Science and Technology in Modern China, 1880s-1940s (Leiden: Brill, 2014). pp. 67–92.
- Liu Shipei, "Miscellaneous Notes on Literature" in Kirk Denton, ed., Modern Chinese Literary Thought: Writings on Literature, 1893- 1945 (Stanford University Press, 1995), pp. 87–89.
- Zarrow, Peter (1988). "He Zhen and Anarcho-Feminism in China" (PDF). Journal of Asian Studies. 47 (4): 796–813. doi:10.2307/2057853. JSTOR 2057853. S2CID 155072159.
- Zarrow, Peter Gue (1990). Anarchism and Chinese Political Culture. New York: Columbia University Press. ISBN 0231071388.
- Zarrow, Peter (1998), "Citizenship and Human Rights in Early Twentieth Century Chinese Thought: Liu Shipei and Liang Qichao", in de Bary, William Theodore; Tu Weiming (eds.), Confucianism and Human Rights, pp. 209–33
