= Yan Yuan (Qing dynasty) =

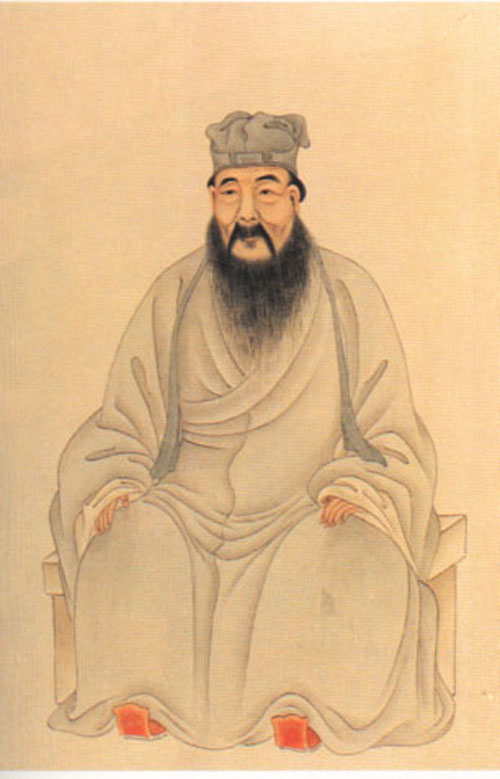
Yan Yuan's portrait

Yan Yuan (Chinese: 颜元; pinyin: Yán Yuán; Wade–Giles: Yen Yuan; 1635–1704), courtesy name Yizhi or Hunran, art name Xizhai (Chinese: 习斋; pinyin: Xízhāi; Wade–Giles: Hsi-chai) was a Chinese classicist, essayist, and philosopher. He founded the practical school of Confucianism to contrast with the more ethereal Neo-Confucianism that had been popular in China for the previous six centuries. Like the Han learning scholars, he rejected the abstract metaphysics of the Neo-Confucians. However, he considered Han learning as too obsessed with philology and textual criticism and not enough emphasis on pragmatism. His school promoted the Six Arts.

He was born on April 27, 1635, in the Zhili province (now called Hebei) in China and spent his youth in poverty, after his father was taken into the Qing army and never returned. He died on September 30, 1704, in the same province.

The ideas of Yan Yuan were developed by his disciple Li Gong zh:李塨 (Yan-Li school).

Yan's intellectual heritage was addressed by Wu Han in the 20th century. Wu elaborated on the Yan's concept of the relation between history and the present.

== See also ==
- Silhak

== Bibliography ==
- Chan, Wing-tsit (trans.), 1963, A Source Book in Chinese Philosophy, Princeton, NJ: Princeton University Press.
- Hummel, Arthur W. Sr., ed. (1943). "Yen Yüan" . Eminent Chinese of the Ch'ing Period. United States Government Printing Office.
- https://repository.arizona.edu/handle/10150/288286?show=full Gerald E. Bragg
