= Dai Zhen =

Qing Chinese philosopher

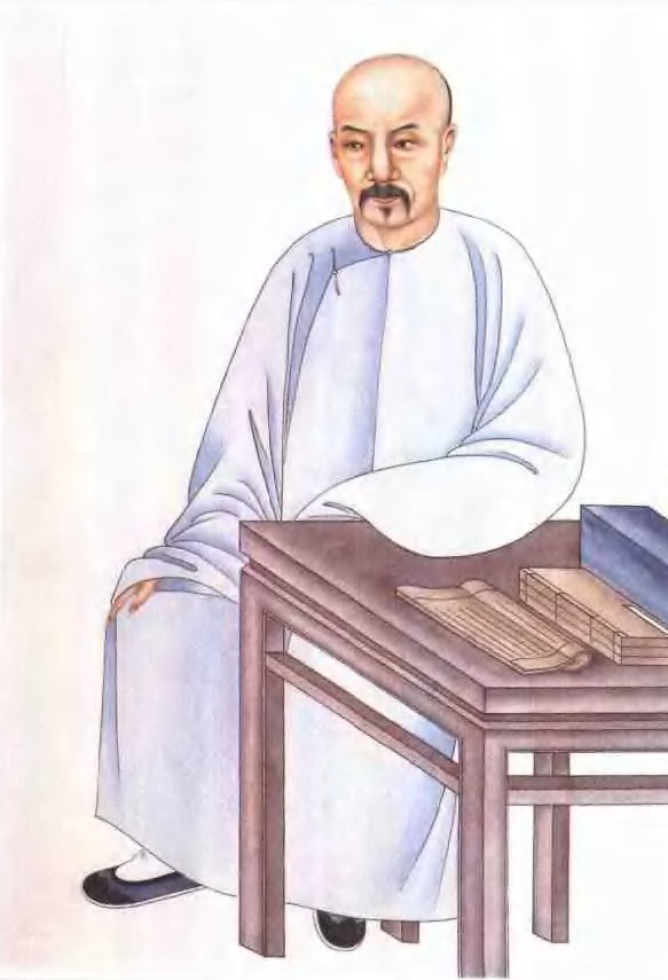
- Dai Zhen
- Born: January 19, 1724; Xiuning, Anhui, Qing China
- Died: July 1, 1777 (aged 53)
- Other names: Tai Chen, Shenxiu, Dongyuan
- Occupation: Philosopher

Dai Zhen (Chinese: 戴震; pinyin: Dài Zhèn; Wade–Giles: Tai Chen, January 19, 1724 – July 1, 1777), courtesy name Shenxiu (慎修), art name Dongyuan (東原), was a Chinese philosopher of the Qing dynasty. Hailing from Xiuning, Anhui Dai was a versatile scholar who made great contributions to mathematics, geography, phonology and philosophy. His philosophical and philological critiques of Neo-Confucianism continue to be influential. In 1773, Dai was recruited by scholar Ji Yun to be one of the editors of the official encyclopedia and collection of books, Siku Quanshu.

Dai's philosophical contributions included those to the Han Learning school of Evidential Learning (Evidentialism) which criticized the Song Learning school of Neo-Confucianism. In particular, two criticisms that Dai made were: First, Neo-Confucianism focused too much on introspective self-examination whereas truth was to be found in investigation of the external world.

Second, he criticized the Neo-Confucian drive to eliminate human desire as an obstacle to rational investigation. Dai argued that human desire was a good and integral part of the human experience, and that eliminating human desire from philosophy had the bad effect of making it difficult to understand and control one's emotions as well as making it impossible to establish empathy with others.

== Works ==
Dai Zhen's best-known works include:

- Faxianglun (On images and patterns)
- Du Yi Xici lun xing (Reading “Appended Words” in The Book of Changes on human nature)
- Du Meng Zi lun xing (Reading Mencius about human nature)
- Yuanshan (Tracing the origin of goodness) in three chapters
- Meng Zi sishulu (Record of Mencius's private virtue)
- Xuyan (Prefatory words)
- Daxue buzhu (Additional annotations to the Daxue)
- Zhongyong buzhu (Additional annotations to the Zhongyong)
- Meng Zi ziyi shuzheng (Evidential Commentary on the Meaning of the Words of Mencius)
- Yu mou shu (A letter to a certain person)
- Yu Peng jinshi Yunchu shu
- Dingchou zhengyue yu Duan Yucai shu (A letter to Duan Yucai dated in the first month of the year dingchou [February 1777])

== Sources ==
- Elman, Benjamin A. From Philosophy to Philology: Intellectual and Social Aspects of Change in Late Imperial China. Cambridge, MA: Council on East Asian Studies, 1984.
- Tiwald, Justin. Internet Encyclopedia of Philosophy entry on Dai Zhen
- Encyclopedia of Religion entry on Dai Zhen
- Fang, Chao-ying (1943). "Tai Chên" . In Hummel, Arthur W. Sr. (ed.). Eminent Chinese of the Ch'ing Period. United States Government Printing Office.
- Hu, Shih (1943). "A Note on Ch'üan Tsu-wang, Chao I-ch'ing and Tai Chên" . In Hummel, Arthur W. Sr. (ed.). Eminent Chinese of the Ch'ing Period. United States Government Printing Office.
