= Ruan Yuan =

Chinese historian, politician and writer (1764–1849)

Ruan Yuan 阮元
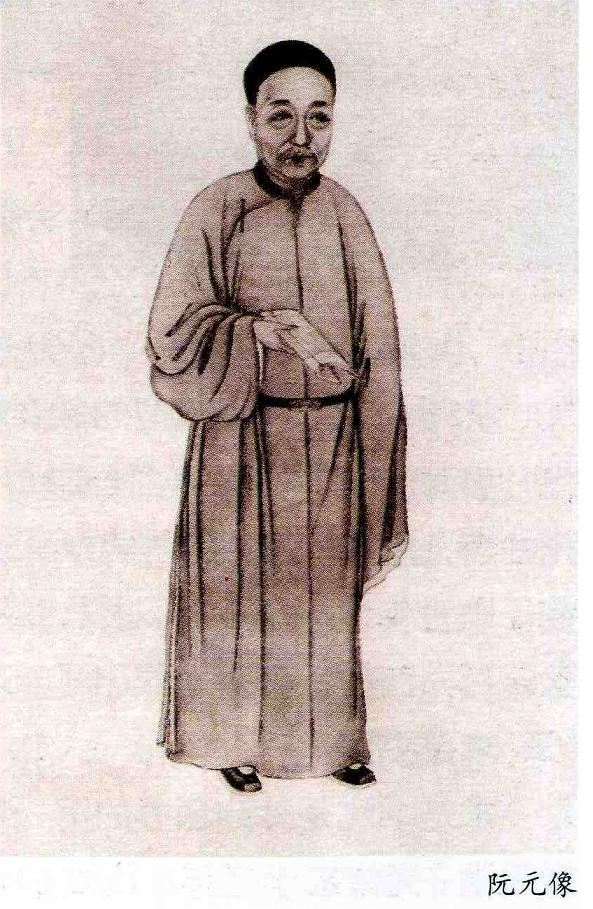

Grand Secretary of the Tiren Library
- In office 1835–1838

Assistant Grand Secretary
- In office 1832–1835

Viceroy of Huguang
- In office 1816–1817
- Preceded by: Sun Yuting
- Succeeded by: Qingbao

Viceroy of Liangguang
- In office 22 October 1817 – 22 June 1826
- Preceded by: Jiang Youxian
- Succeeded by: Li Hongbin

Viceroy of Yun-Gui
- In office 1826–1835
- Preceded by: Zhao Shenzhen
- Succeeded by: Yilibu

Viceroy of Rivers and Waterways
- In office 1812–1814
- Preceded by: Xu Zhaochun
- Succeeded by: Guifang

Personal details
- Born: February 21, 1764 Yizheng, Qing dynasty
- Died: November 27, 1849 (aged 85) Yangzhou, Qing dynasty
- Occupation: Historian, politician, writer

Ruan Yuan
- Chinese: 阮元
Transcriptions
Standard Mandarin
- Hanyu Pinyin: Ruǎn Yuán
- Wade–Giles: Juan^{3} Yüan^{2}
- IPA: [ɻwàn ɥɛ̌n]
Wu
- Romanization: Niun-nyy
Yue: Cantonese
- Yale Romanization: Yúhn Yùhn
- Jyutping: Jyun^{5} Jyun^{4}
Southern Min
- Tâi-lô: Ńg Guân

Ruan Yuan (Chinese: 阮元; 1764–1849), courtesy name Boyuan (伯元), art name Yuntai (芸臺), posthumous name Wenda (文達), was a Chinese historian, politician, and writer of the Qing dynasty who was the most prominent Chinese scholar during the first half of the 19th century. He won the jinshi degree in the imperial examinations in 1789 and was subsequently appointed to the Hanlin Academy. He was known for his work Biographies of Astronomers and Mathematicians and for his editing the Shisan Jing Zhushu (Commentaries and Notes on the Thirteen Classics) for the Qing emperor.

Ruan Yuan was a successful official as well as a scholar. He was the Viceroy of Liangguang, the most important imperial official in Canton (Guangzhou), during the critical years 1817–1826, just before the First Opium War with Britain. It was a crucial time when Chinese trade with the outside world was allowed only through the Canton System, with all foreigners confined to Canton, the capital of Guangdong Province. During his tenure in Canton, Ruan is estimated to have earned more than 195,000 taels of silver.

He was widely recognized as an official, scholar, and patron of learning both by his contemporaries and by modern scholars. He was also praised as an honest official and an exemplary man of the ‘Confucian persuasion’. His name is mentioned in almost all works on Qing history or Chinese classics because of the wide range of his research and publications. A number of these publications are still reprinted. Ruan Yuan was a follower of the Han Learning tradition and as such, with the encouragement of Liu Fenglu, he edited and organized publication of the compendium of the imperial achievements in kaozheng scholarship, the Huang Qing Jingjie (皇清经解) published in 1829.

Kong Luhua (relative of the Duke Yansheng) was the second wife of Ruan Yuan.

== See also ==
- Yanjingshi ji
- Wei Yuan
- Lin Zexu
- Qishan
- Yishan

Government offices
Preceded by Jiang Youxian (蔣攸銛)	Governor-general of Liangguang; 22 October 1817 – 22 June 1826	Succeeded by Li Hongbin (李鴻賓)
