= Duan Yucai =

Chinese philologist and linguist (1735–1815)

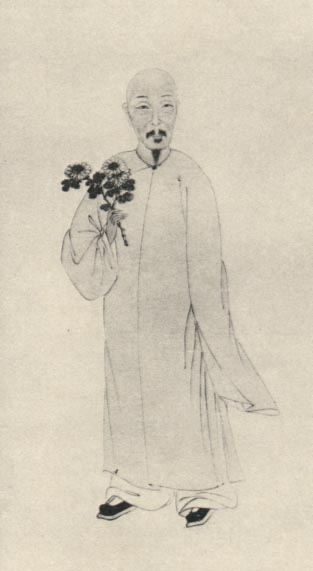
Duan Yucai

Duan Yucai (Chinese: 段玉裁) (1735–1815), courtesy name Ruoying (若膺) was a Chinese philologist of the Qing Dynasty. He made great contributions to the study of Historical Chinese phonology, and is known for his annotated edition of Shuowen Jiezi.

== Biography ==
A native of Jintan, Jiangsu, he resigned his government post at the age of 46 to concentrate on his studies. A student of Dai Zhen, he divided Old Chinese words into 17 rhyme groups. He suggested that "characters sharing the same phonetic component must belong to the same rhyme group [as deduced from the rhyming scheme of Shijing]" (同聲必同部). He also suggested that there is no departing tone in Old Chinese.

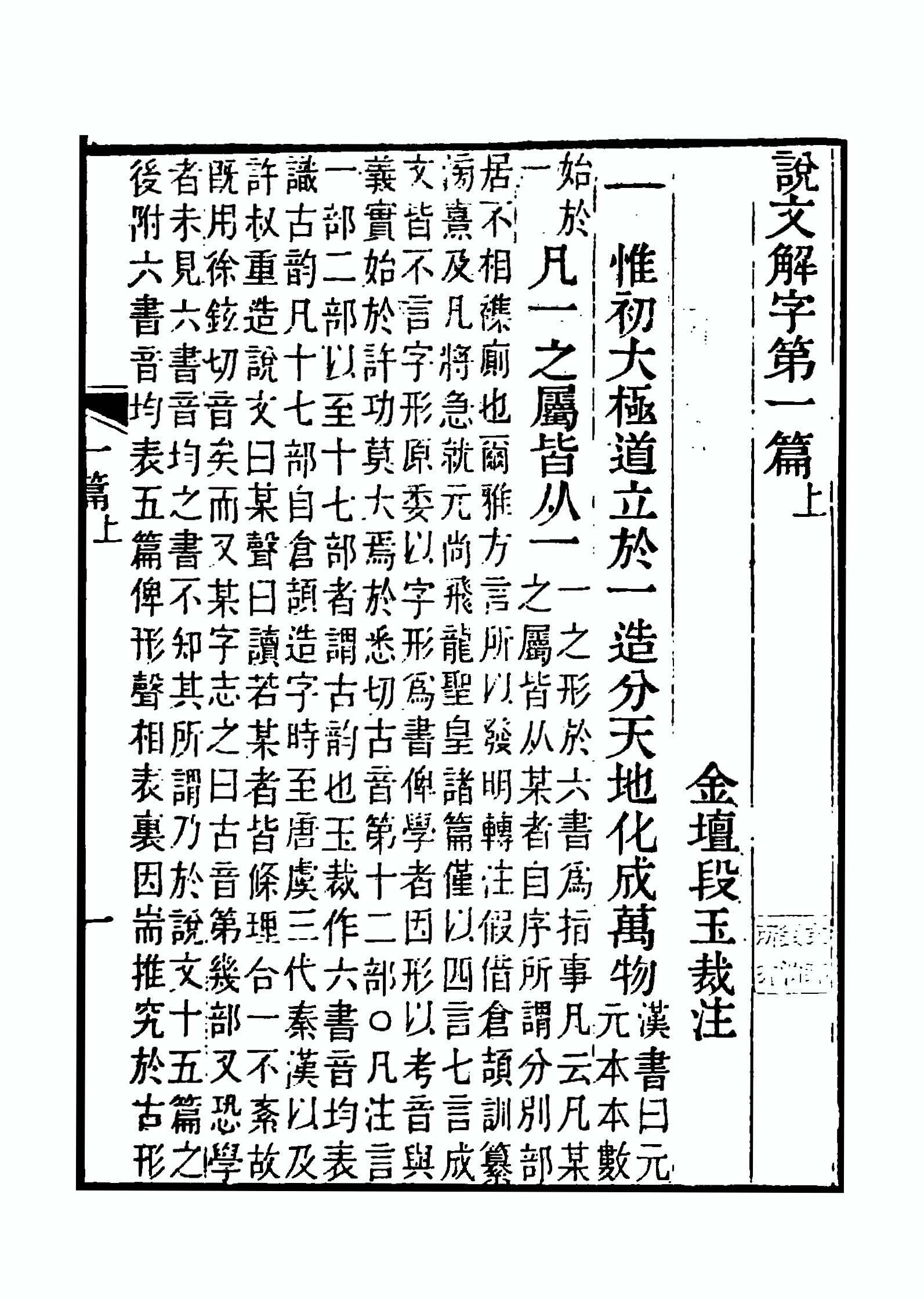
Shuowen Jiezi Zhu, page 1

His monumental Shuowen Jiezi Zhu (說文解字注 "Annotated Shuowen Jiezi"), which he spent 30 years to complete, was published shortly before his death (in 1815). Wang Niansun, in his preface to the work, says that "it has been 1,700 years since a work of the same quality appeared" (蓋千七百年來無此作矣), suggesting that it is the greatest Chinese philological work since Shuowen Jiezi, which was published during the early 2nd century.

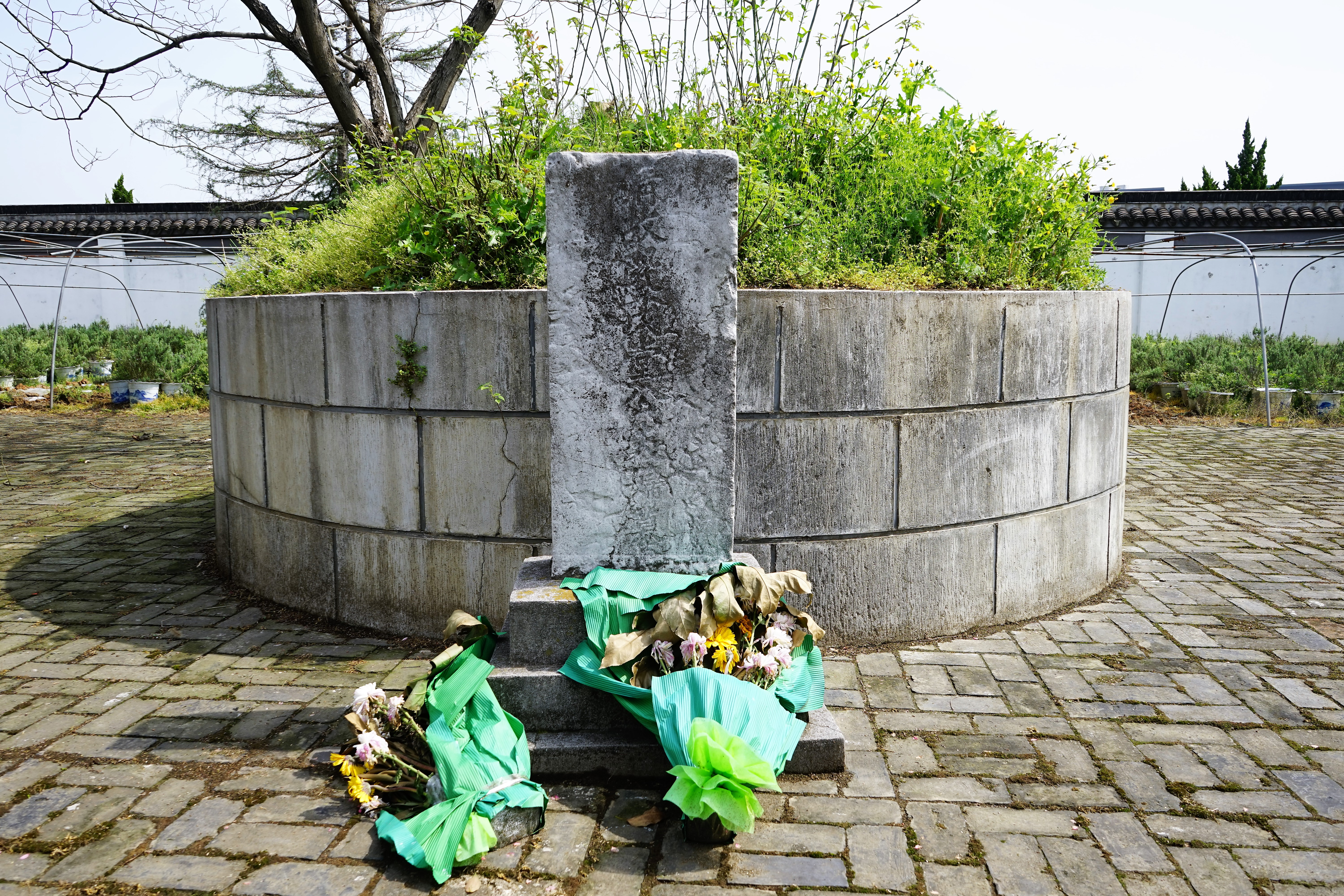
Tomb of Duan Yucai
