= Tang Shunzhi =

- 唐順之
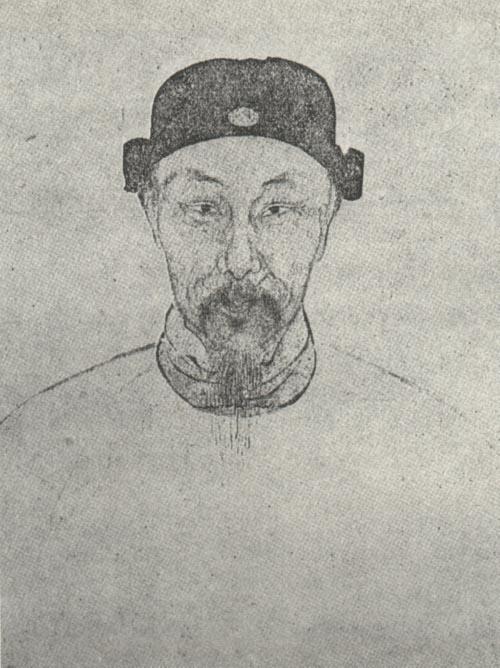

Personal details
- Born: November 9, 1507; Wujin, Changzhou, Nanzhili, Ming Dynasty
- Died: April 25, 1560 (aged 52)
- Occupation: statesman, scholar

Tang Shunzhi (traditional Chinese: 唐順之; simplified Chinese: 唐顺之; pinyin: Táng Shùnzhī) was a Chinese engineer, mathematician, statesman, and martial artist in the Ming dynasty.

== Biography ==
Born in Wujin District, Nanzhili Province. At first, he was educated at home. Then he began preparing for state exams. At this time, he became interested in mathematics, especially the works of Islamic algebraists.

In 1529, he successfully passed the capital's huishi exam and received the degree of gongsheng. He was offered a position at the Hanlin Imperial Academy, but Tang chose to serve in the military department. Later, he received the position of Right Censor-in-Chief (右僉都御史). In 1533 he became a member of Huanling, where he organized archival records. However, due to illness, he left public service for some time.

After recovery, he returned to the imperial court. Then he received the post of Governor of Fengyang County (in modern Anhui Province) to strengthen the fight against pirates. During this service, Tang Shunzhi died in Tongzhou, having previously obtained success in destruction of the pirates. Posthumously, he was given the name Xiangwen.

== Mathematics ==
Tang Shunzhi has to his credit works on studying methods for measuring the elements of a circle. He wrote five books: Gougu Cewang Lun (勾股測望論, “Considerations Concerning Measurement at Distances of the Major and Minor Legs”), Gougu Rong Fangyuan Lun (勾股容方圓論, “Discourse on the Circle and the Square, what the larger and smaller legs contain"), Fenfa Lun (分法論, "Reflections on Methods of Distribution"), Liufen Lun (六分論, "Reflections on Division by Six"), Hushi Lun (弧矢論, “Judgements about the arc and chord”), of which the last one is the most important.
