= Hanxue =

Chinese school of philology

Hanxue (simplified Chinese: 汉学; traditional Chinese: 漢學; pinyin: Hànxué), or the Han school, was an intellectual movement that reached its height in the middle of the Qing dynasty (1644–1912) in China. The focus of the movement was to reject neo-Confucianism in order to return to a study of the original Confucian texts.

== Nature and origins ==
Han learning began with the "evidential scholarship" (simplified Chinese: 考证; traditional Chinese: 考證; pinyin: kǎozhèng) movement of the late Ming dynasty, which was a reaction against the so-called "Song Learning", or Neo-Confucianism that had arisen during the Song dynasty (12th century). Neo-Confucianism had incorporated Buddhist and Daoist influences into the Confucianist tradition, introducing a new cosmology emphasising the moral nature of the cosmos. Neo-Confucianism was adopted as Confucian orthodoxy under the Song dynasty and formed the basis of the imperial examination until nearly the end of the Qing dynasty.

Evidential scholars reacted to the innovations of Neo-Confucianism by turning back to the original classics, employing philological techniques to try to authenticate the real words of Confucius. This involved the comparison of different texts in great detail. This school of learning came to be called “Han Learning” because it sought out Han dynasty commentaries as being closer to the original texts.

== Growth of influence ==
The fall of the Ming dynasty and the rise of the Qing dynasty was a watershed in the development of this trend of philological thought. Scholars in the evidential scholarship tradition attacked the heterodox and subjective ideals of "Song learning" as having betrayed the true teachings of Confucius, resulting in decadence, individualism, and factionalism in the Ming court. This was blamed for bringing about the fall of the Ming dynasty.

The Han Learning scholars played an important role in many intellectual works sponsored by the Qing court. They were involved in the Complete Library of the Four Treasuries, a monumental encyclopaedic project commissioned by the Qianlong Emperor which involved the collection of the entire Chinese canon of studies on the mind, nature, government and humanity. While this work was firmly grounded in Neo-Confucian orthodoxy, the philological expertise of evidential scholars was drawn on to ensure the authenticity of the canon. Han Learning played a major role in providing annotations and evidential scholarship on regulations and edicts, together with works of philosophers.

By the mid-eighteenth century, Han learning (Yan Ruoqu, Hui Dong) had proved that various parts of the sacred classics were in fact later forgeries of the Han dynasty.

While it may appear to be concerned with philological minutiae, the debate between the Neo-Confucianists and the adherents of Han learning had considerable repercussions, weakening the cosmological underpinnings of the imperial state, although not its political dominance. Han Learning and Song Learning were eventually blended into a new school of thought during the late Qing.

This Qing era revival movement called for rationalist and practical evidential research in fields such as astronomy, linguistics, mathematics, geography and technology, to counter the metaphysical speculation of Neo-Confucianism. These scholars also sought to reform the Imperial examinations which they criticised as outdated.

Scholars involved included Wang Fuzhi, Gu Yanwu, Yan Yuan, Li Gong, Dai Zhen, Duan Yucai, Ji Yun, Zhang Xuecheng, Ruan Yuan, and Liao Ping. In the late Qing period, Han Learning appealed to many reformers and revolutionaries such as Kang Youwei, an advocate of constitutional monarchy; Tan Sitong, a fervent anti-Manchu polemicist; and Liu Shipei, a devout nationalist who was first a revolutionary and an anarchist, but supported Yuan Shikai's attempt to become emperor. Cui Shu went further and rejected Han learning in an attempt to recover pre-Han Confucianism.

== Political activity ==
According to B. Elman, many Han Learning proponents were involved in opposition to Heshen's clique (1746–1799), thus suggesting that typical portrayal of this group as apolitical should be reconsidered.

== Medicine ==
A remarkable parallel to the revival of Han learning in the late imperial period is provided by development of the Han medicine (Kampo in Japan). Same as Han learning stood in the opposition to the intellectual trend of the three previous dynasties, Han medicine was a reaction against the standard of Song-Ming medicine (the so-called "neo-Confucianization of the body").

== See also ==
- Neo-Confucianism
- Old Texts
