= He Xiu (Han dynasty) =

He Xiu (Chinese: 何休; pinyin: Hé Xiū; Wade–Giles: Ho Hsiu; 129–182) was a Chinese philosopher and philologist during the Later Han dynasty. He was a prominent representative of the New Text school (Jinwen jingxue). He rose to become the chief advisor to the emperor. He is the author of commentaries on the Gongyang Commentary on the Spring and Autumn Annals (Gongyang zhuan), titled Chunqiu Gongyang jiegu 春秋公羊解詁, which was part of the History of the Later Han (Hou Hanshu). Many of his works are lost or only preserved in fragments. He was influenced by Dong Zhongshu (c. 179–104 BCE). His Theory of the Three Ages (Chinese: 三世說; pinyin: Sānshìshuō) had a decisive influence on the development of Kang Youwei’s (1858–1927) utopian theory. According to He Xiu, Confucius attempted to bring the whole world to peace and order by working out from its own situation and transforming the "age of decay and disorder" into the age of "approaching peace" and finally into the "age of universal peace".

== Bibliography ==
- 汉英中国哲学辞典. 开封 2002
- Rodney Leon Taylor, Howard Y. F. Choy: The Illustrated Encyclopedia of Confucianism. 2005, Vol. I A–M (online preview)
- Article: “He Xiu”, in: Rafe de Crespigny: A Biographical Dictionary of Later Han to the Three Kingdoms. 2006 (online preview)
- Joachim Gentz: Das Gongyang zhuan. Auslegung und Kanonisierung der Frühlings- und Herbstannalen (Chunqiu). Wiesbaden, Harrassowitz, 2001 (Opera Sinologica 12)
