= Timeline of the Republic of China =

This is a timeline of the Republic of China.

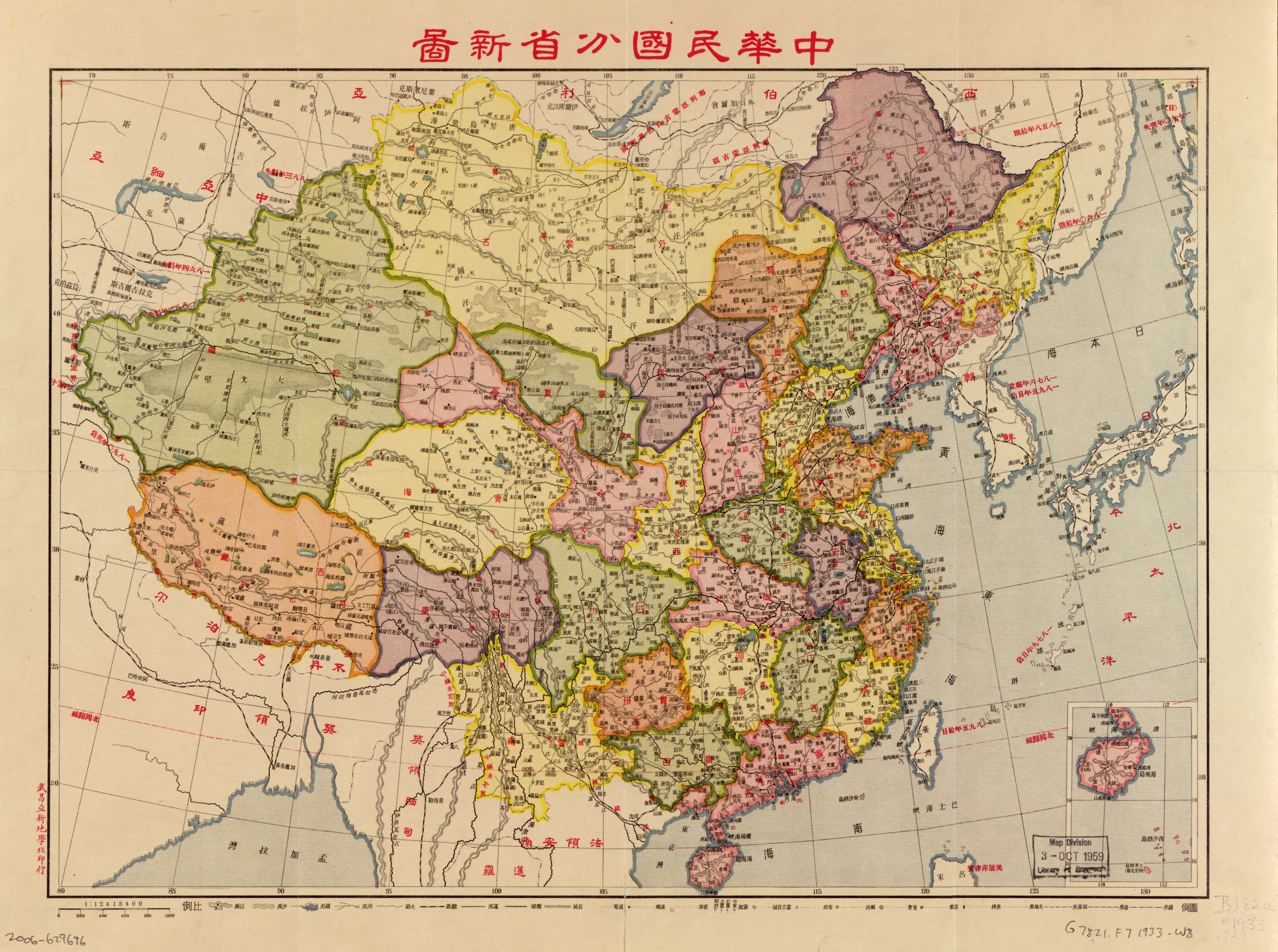
Republic of China in 1930s.

== Mainland period (1912–1949) ==
=== 1911–1920 ===
National Flag of the Republic of China, used between 1912 and 1928. Also known as "Five-colored flag".

- 1911: Wuchang Uprising.
- 1911: Flag of the Republic of China "Five-Colored Flag" selected as the national flag by the provisional senate.
- 1912: Sun Yat-sen elected First Provisional President of the ROC by delegates from independent provinces.
- 1912: Last emperor of China Puyi forced to abdicate, Yuan Shikai became president.
- 1915: Twenty-One Demands.
- 1916: Yuan Shikai dies.
- 1917: Manchu Restoration to restore monarchy in China by General Zhang Xun.
- 1919: Treaty of Versailles is established.
- 1919: May Fourth Movement.

=== 1921–1930 ===
- 1921: Beiyang government lost control of Outer Mongolia.
- 1924: Whampoa Military Academy established.
- 1925: Sun Yat-sen dies, National Revolutionary Army founded.
- 1926: beginning of the Northern Expedition.
- 1927: Shanghai massacre, beginning of the Chinese Civil War.
- 1928: end of the Northern Expedition, Flag of the Republic of China "Blue Sky, White Sun, and a Wholly Red Earth" flag adopted as the nation's official flag.

=== 1931–1940 ===
Flag of the Republic of China from 1928.

- 1930: Central Plains War broke out.
- 1931: Japanese invasion of Manchuria.
- 1932: Pacification of Manchukuo.
- 1933: Defense of the Great Wall.
- 1936: Xi'an Incident, Chiang Kai-shek was detained by his subordinates Zhang Xueliang and Yang Hucheng.
- 1937: Marco Polo Bridge Incident, mass start of Second Sino-Japanese War.

=== 1941–1950 ===
- 1943: USA repeals the Chinese Exclusion Act.
- 1945: Republic of China begins administrating Taiwan. Per treaty, the United States of America is the principal occupying power and the ROC/KMT is a subordinate occupying power.
- 1945: Sino-Soviet Treaty of Friendship and Alliance.
- 1946: Second Kuomintang-Communist Civil War begins.
- 1948: Universal Declaration of Human Rights adopted by the United Nations General Assembly. P. C. Chang is among its authors.
- 1949: On 1 October, Mao Zedong declares the creation of the People's Republic of China, which considers itself as the successor state. The ROC central government relocates to Taiwan.

== Taiwan period (after 1949) ==
=== 1951–1960 ===
- 1952: San Francisco Peace Treaty comes into force. Japan renounces all right, title, and claim to Taiwan, but no "receiving country" is designated. The ROC claims to have formally acquired the territorial sovereignty over Taiwan and Penghu through peace treaties with Japan.
- 1952: Treaty of Taipei comes into force. Article 2 recognizes the disposition of Taiwan as specified in the San Francisco Peace Treaty.
- 1955: Mutual Defense Treaty with the United States comes into force. Article 6 recognizes the effective territorial control of the ROC over Taiwan.
- 1960: US President Dwight Eisenhower visited Taiwan.

=== 1961–1970 ===
- 1964: Shimen Dam, largest in Taiwan at the time, was completed.

=== 1971–1980 ===
- 1973: Zengwun Dam was completed.
- 1974: Techi Dam was completed.

=== 1981–1990 ===
- 1984: Junghua Dam was completed.
- 1986: Opposition political parties were allowed.
- 1987: Martial law was lifted.
- 1988: The restriction on newspapers was lifted.

=== 1991–2000 ===
- 1992: South Korea recognized People's Republic of China, severing ties with the Republic of China.
- 1995: The People's Republic of China test fired missiles to waters within 60 kilometers of Taiwan, followed by live fire military exercises, in an attempt to sway election results.
- 1996: The first direct vote election was held for the office of the President of the Republic of China. People's Republic of China again fired missiles near Taiwan in an act of intimidation.

=== 2001–2010 ===
- 2004: Taipei 101, the tallest building in the world until 2011, was completed.
- 2004: Death of Chiang Fang-liang, spouse of President Chiang Ching-kuo.
- 2004: Taekwondo athlete Chen Shih-hsin at the Athens Olympic Games won the first gold medal for Chinese Taipei

== See also ==
- Timeline of Chinese history
- Timeline of Taiwanese history
- History of the Republic of China
