= Republican period =

Republican period may refer to many periods in several nations, including:

- The Republican period in Cuba
- The Roman Republic.
- The French Republic.
- Republican China.
- Any of several periods in the United States where the Republican Party controlled the federal government, or within individual US states or local governments when Republicans controlled those governments.
