= History of the Republic of China =

The history of the Republic of China began in 1912 with the end of the Qing dynasty, when the Xinhai Revolution and the formation of the Republic of China put an end to 2,000 years of imperial rule. The Republic experienced many trials and tribulations after its founding which included being dominated by elements as disparate as warlord generals and foreign powers.

In 1928, the Republic was nominally unified under the Kuomintang (KMT; also called "Chinese Nationalist Party") after the Northern Expedition, and was in the early stages of industrialization and modernization when it was caught in the conflicts involving the Kuomintang government, the Chinese Communist Party (CCP), local warlords, and the Empire of Japan. Most nation-building efforts were stopped during the full-scale Second Sino-Japanese War against Japan from 1937 to 1945, and later the widening gap between the Kuomintang and the Communist Party made a coalition government impossible, causing the resumption of the Chinese Civil War, in 1946, shortly after the Japanese surrender to the Allied Powers in September 1945.

A series of political, economic and military missteps led to the KMT's defeat and its retreat to Taiwan (formerly "Formosa") in 1949, where it established an authoritarian one-party state under Generalissimo/President Chiang Kai-shek. This state considers and until the 1990s actively asserted itself to be the continuing sole legitimate ruler of all of China, referring to the communist government or "regime" as illegitimate, a so-called "People's Republic of China" (PRC) declared in Beijing by Mao Zedong in 1949, as "mainland China" and "communist bandit". The Republic of China was supported for many years – even decades – by many nations, especially the United States who established a 1954 Mutual Defense treaty. After political liberalization began in the late 1960s, the PRC was able – after a constant yearly campaign in the United Nations – to finally get approval in 1971 to take the seat for "China" in the General Assembly, and more importantly, be seated as one of the five permanent members of the Security Council. After recovering from this shock of rejection by its former allies and liberalization in the late 1970s from the Nationalist authoritarian government and following the death of Chiang Kai-shek, the Republic of China has transformed itself into a multiparty, representative democracy on Taiwan and given more representation to those native Taiwanese, whose ancestors predate the 1949 mainland evacuation.

== Provisional Government (1912) ==
=== Founding of the republic ===
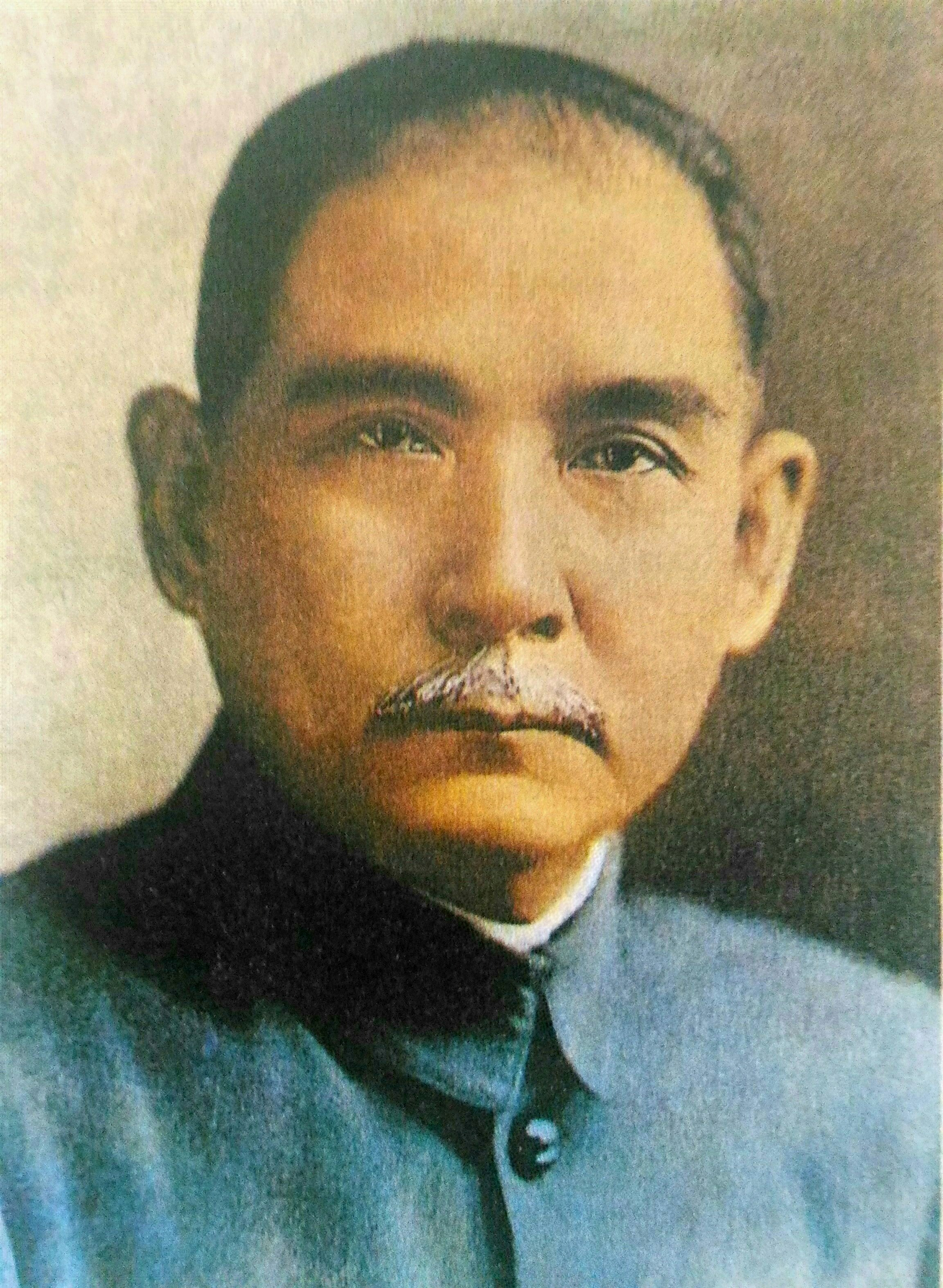
Sun Yat-sen, the founding father of Republic of China, the oldest surviving republic in Asia.

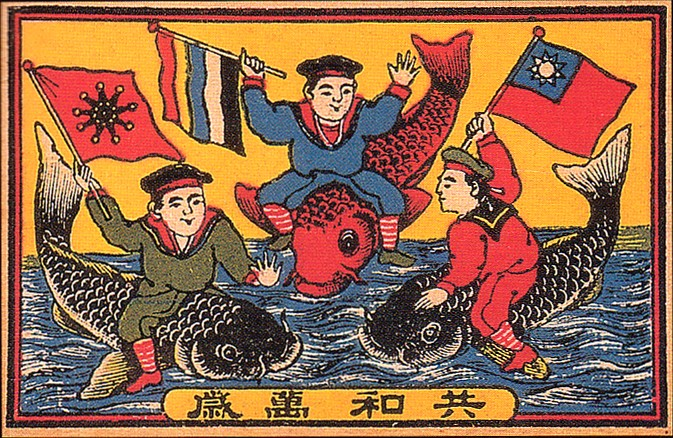
Three different flags were originally used during the Revolution. The bottom message says Long live the Republic! with the five races represented by the Five-Color Flag of the Republic.

The Qing dynasty in the late 19th and early 20th centuries was challenged by civil unrest and foreign invasions ever since they lost the Sino-Japanese War in 1895. Internal rebellions and their repression brought millions of deaths, conflicts with foreign Western European powers brought humiliating unequal treaties, exacted reparations that burdened the fiscal system, and compromised the country's territorial integrity. Popular sentiment among Han Chinese grew that political power should return to the majority Han Chinese from the minority Manchus. Following the Boxer Rebellion and the invasion of the imperialist powers to put it down, the Qing Imperial Court launched fundamental institutional and political reforms, such as abolishing the Imperial examination system in 1905, drafting a constitution in 1906, the establishment of provincial legislatures in 1909, and the preparations for electing a national parliament in 1910. However, Manchu conservatives in the Qing Court thought these reforms went too far and distrustful critics felt they did not go far enough. Reformers were either imprisoned or executed outright. The failures of the Imperial Court to enact such political liberalization and modernization caused the reformists to take the road of revolution.

There were many revolutionary groups, but the most organized one was founded by Sun Yat-sen (Chinese: 孫逸仙), a republican and anti-Qing activist who became increasingly popular among overseas Chinese and Chinese students abroad, especially in Japan. In 1905 Sun founded the Tongmenghui in Tokyo with Huang Xing, a popular leader of the Chinese revolutionary movement in Japan, as his deputy.

This movement, generously supported by overseas Chinese funds, also gained political support with regional military officers and some of the reformers who had fled China after the Hundred Days' Reform. Sun's political philosophy was conceptualized in 1897, first enunciated in Tokyo in 1905 and modified through the early 1920s. It centered on the Three Principles of the People: "nationalism, democracy, and people's livelihood".

The principle of nationalism called for overthrowing the Manchus and ending foreign hegemony over China. The second principle, democracy, was used to describe Sun's goal of a popularly elected republican form of government and changes such as land reform.

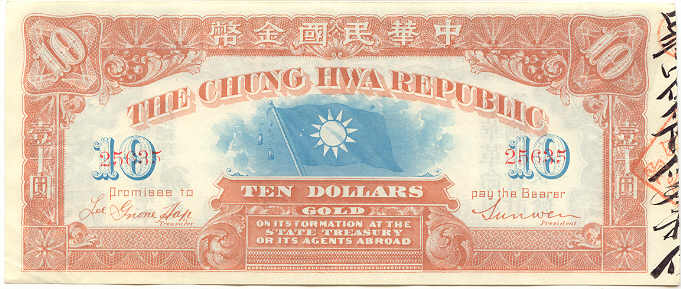
Bonds that Sun Yat-sen used to raise money for revolutionary cause. The Republic of China was also once known as the Chunghwa Republic.

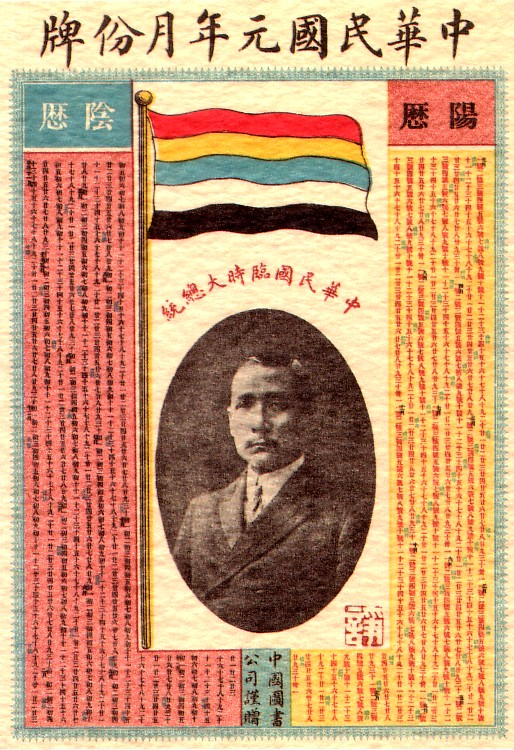
A calendar that commemorates the first year of the Republic as well as the election of Sun Yat-sen as the provisional President.

The Republican Era of China began with the outbreak of revolution on 10 October 1911, in Wuchang, the capital of Hubei Province, among discontented modernized army units whose anti-Qing plot had been uncovered. This would be known as the Wuchang Uprising, which is celebrated as Double Tenth Day in Taiwan. It had been preceded by numerous abortive uprisings and organized protests inside China. The revolt quickly spread to neighboring cities, and Tongmenghui members throughout the country rose in support of the Wuchang revolutionary forces. On 12 October, the Revolutionaries succeeded in capturing Hankou and Hanyang. However, the euphoria engendered by this victory was short-lived. On 27 October, Yuan Shikai was reappointed by the Qing Court to lead the New Army, and loyalist forces under Feng Guozhang and Duan Qirui moved south to retake Wuhan. After heavy fighting in November, the out-manned and out-gunned Revolutionary Army was driven out of Hankou and Hanyang, and retreated to Wuchang south of the Yangtze. During the 41-day Battle of Yangxia, however, 15 of the 24 provinces had declared their independence from the Qing empire. Yuan Shikai halted his army's advance on Wuchang and began to negotiate with the revolutionaries. A month later, Sun Yat-sen returned to China from the United States, where he had been raising funds among Chinese and American sympathizers.

On 1 January 1912, delegates from the independent provinces elected Sun Yat-sen as the first Provisional President of the Republic of China. Yuan Shikai agreed to accept the Republic and forced the last emperor of China, Puyi, to abdicate on 12 February. Empress Dowager Longyu signed the abdication papers. Puyi was allowed to continue living in the Forbidden City, however. The Republic of China officially succeeded the Qing Dynasty.

== Beiyang era (1912–1928) ==
=== Early republic ===
On 1 January 1912, Sun officially declared the establishment of the Republic of China and was inaugurated in Nanjing as the first Provisional President. However, power in Beijing already had passed to Yuan Shikai, who had effective control of the Beiyang Army, the most powerful military force in China at the time. To prevent civil war and possible foreign intervention from undermining the infant republic, Sun agreed to Yuan's demand for China to be united under a Beijing government headed by him. On 10 March, in Beijing, Yuan Shikai was sworn in as the second Provisional President of the Republic of China.

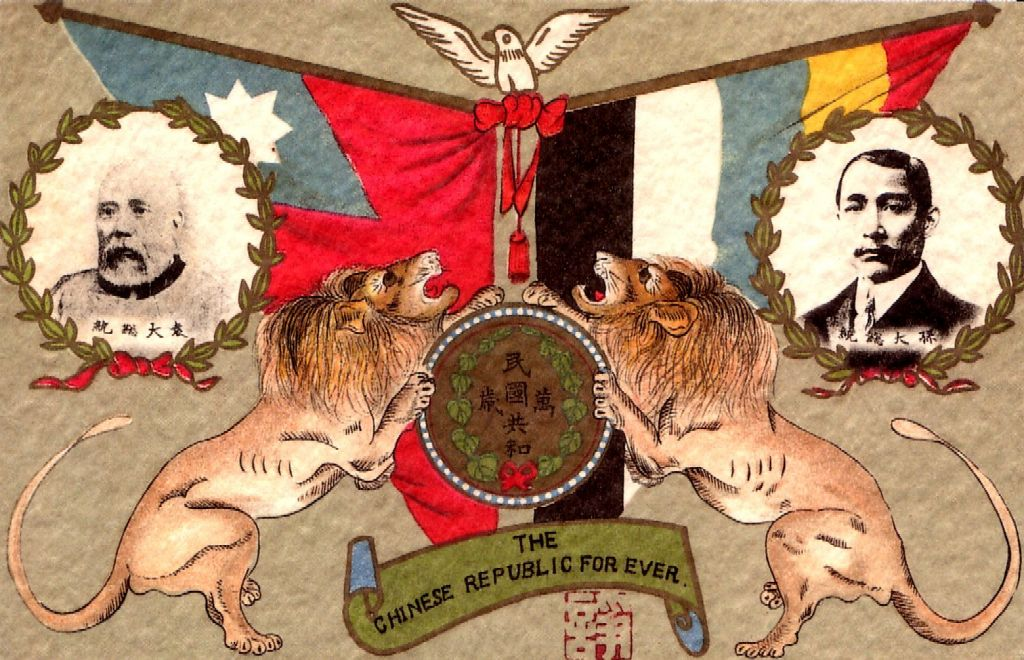
A poster that commemorates permanent President of the Republic of China Yuan Shikai and provisional President of the Republic Sun Yat-sen.

The republic which Sun Yat-sen and his associates envisaged evolved slowly. Although there were many political parties vying for supremacy in the legislature, the revolutionists lacked an army, and soon Yuan Shikai's power began to outstrip that of parliament. Yuan revised the constitution on his own and became dictatorial. In August 1912 the Kuomintang (Nationalist Party) was founded by Song Jiaoren, one of Sun's associates. It was an amalgamation of small political groups, including Sun's Tongmenghui. In the national elections held in February 1913 for the new bicameral parliament, Song campaigned against the Yuan administration, whose representation at the time was largely by the Republican Party, led by Liang Qichao. Song was an able campaigner and the Kuomintang won a majority of seats.

=== Journalism ===
The overthrow of the old imperial regime in 1911 produced a surge in Chinese nationalism, an end to censorship, and a demand for professional, nation-wide journalism. All the major cities launched such efforts. Special attention was paid to China's role in the World War, to the disappointing Paris Peace Conference of 1919, and to the aggressive demands and actions of Japan against Chinese interests. Journalists created professional organizations, and aspired to separate news from commentary. At the Press Congress of the World conference in Honolulu in 1921, the Chinese delegates were among the most Westernized and self-consciously professional journalists from the developing world. By the late 1920s, however, there was a much greater emphasis on advertising and expanding circulation, and much less interest in the sort of advocacy journalism that had inspired the revolutionaries.

=== Second Revolution ===
Song was assassinated in March 1913. Some people believe that Yuan Shikai was responsible, and although it has never been proven, he had already arranged the assassination of several pro-revolutionist generals. Animosity towards Yuan grew. In April he secured a reorganization loan of 25 million pounds sterling from a coalition of banks from Great Britain, France, Russia, Germany and Japan, without consulting the parliament first. The loan was used to finance Yuan's Beiyang Army.

On 20 May, Yuan concluded a deal with Russia that granted Russia special privileges in Outer Mongolia and restricted Chinese rights to station troops there. Kuomintang members of the Parliament accused Yuan of abusing his rights and called for his removal. On the other hand, the Progressive Party (Chinese: 進步黨; pinyin: Jìnbùdǎng), which was composed of constitutional monarchists and supported Yuan, accused the Kuomintang of fomenting an insurrection. Yuan then decided to use military action against the Kuomintang.

In July 1913 seven southern provinces rebelled against Yuan, beginning the Second Revolution (Chinese: 二次革命; pinyin: Èrcì Gémìng). There were several underlying reasons for the Second Revolution besides Yuan's abuse of power. First was that most Revolutionary Armies from different provinces were disbanded after the establishment of the Republic of China, and many officers and soldiers felt that they were not compensated for toppling the Qing Dynasty. These factors gave rise to much discontent against the new government among the military. Secondly, many revolutionaries felt that Yuan Shikai and Li Yuanhong were undeserving of the posts of presidency and vice presidency, because they acquired the posts through political maneuvering rather than participation in the revolutionary movement. Lastly, Yuan's use of violence (such as Song's assassination) dashed the Kuomintang's hope of achieving reforms and political goals through electoral means.

However, the Second Revolution did not fare well for the Kuomintang. The leading Kuomintang military force of Jiangxi was defeated by Yuan's forces on 1 August and Nanchang was taken. On 1 September, Nanjing was taken. When the rebellion was suppressed, Sun and other instigators fled to Japan. In October 1913 an intimidated parliament formally elected Yuan Shikai President of the Republic of China, and the major powers extended recognition to his government. Duan Qirui and other trusted Beiyang generals were given prominent positions in the cabinet. To achieve international recognition, Yuan Shikai had to agree to autonomy for Outer Mongolia and Tibet. China was still to be suzerain, but it would have to allow Russia a free hand in Outer Mongolia and Tanna Tuva and Britain continuation of its influence in Tibet.

=== Mass banditry, Yuan Shikai and the National Protection War ===
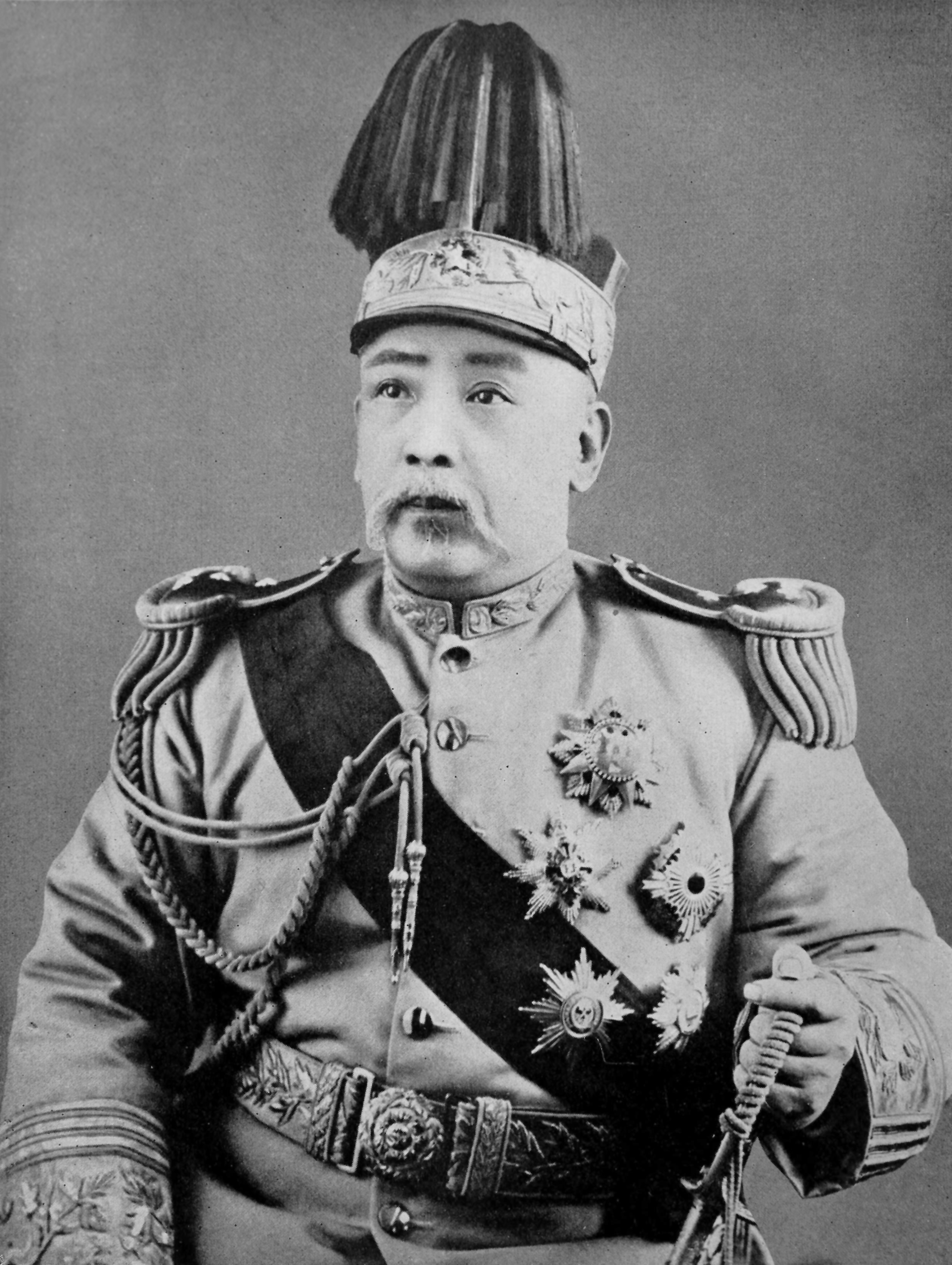
Yuan Shikai as the Emperor of the Empire of China (1915–16).

Bandit leaders with popular movements instigated revolts, with the support of Sun Yat-sen's revolutionaries from Canton. The bandit-led Bai Lang Rebellion ransacked and destroyed much of central China before it was crushed by the Beiyang Army of Yuan Shikai, the Muslim Ma clique and Tibetan militia. These bandits were associated with the Gelaohui.

In November Yuan Shikai, legally president, ordered the Kuomintang dissolved and forcefully removed its members from parliament. Because the majority of the parliament members belonged to the Kuomintang, the parliament did not meet quorum and was subsequently unable to convene. In January 1914 Yuan formally suspended the parliament. In February he called into session a meeting to revise the Provisional Constitution of the Republic of China, which was announced in May of that year. The revision greatly expanded Yuan's powers, allowing him to declare war, sign treaties and appoint officials without seeking approval from the legislature first. In December 1914 he further revised the law and lengthened the term of the President to ten years, with no term limit. Essentially, Yuan was preparing for his ascendancy as the emperor.

On the other hand, since the failure of the Second Revolution, Sun Yat-sen and his allies were trying to rebuild the revolutionary movement. In July 1914 Sun established the Chinese Revolutionary Party (Chinese: 中華革命黨; pinyin: Zhōnghúa Gémìngdǎng). He felt that his failures at building a consistent revolutionary movement stemmed from the lack of cohesiveness among its members. To that end, Sun required that party members to be totally loyal to Sun and follow a series of rather harsh rules. Some of his earlier associates, including Huang Xing, balked at the idea of such authoritarian organization and refused to join Sun. However, they agreed that the republic must not revert to imperial rule.

Besides the revolutionary groups associated with Sun, there were also several other groups aimed at toppling Yuan Shikai. One was the Progressive Party, the original constitutional-monarchist party that opposed the Kuomintang during the Second Revolution. The Progressive Party switched their position largely because of Yuan's sabotage of the national parliament. Secondly, many provincial governors who had declared their independence from the Qing Imperial Court in 1912 found the idea of supporting another Imperial Court utterly ridiculous. Yuan also alienated his Beiyang generals by centralizing tax collection from local authorities. In addition, public opinion was overwhelmingly anti-Yuan.

When World War I broke out in 1914, Japan fought on the Allied side and seized German holdings in Shandong Province. In 1915 the Japanese set before the government in Beijing the so-called Twenty-One Demands, aimed at securing Japanese economic controls in railway and mining operations in Shandong, Manchuria and Fujian. The Japanese also pressed to have Yuan Shikai appoint Japanese advisors to key positions in the Chinese government. The Twenty-One Demands would have made China effectively a Japanese protectorate. The Beijing government rejected some of these demands but yielded to the Japanese insistence on keeping the Shandong territory already in its possession. Beijing also recognized Tokyo's authority over southern Manchuria and eastern Inner Mongolia. Yuan's acceptance of the demands was extremely unpopular, but he continued his monarchist agenda nevertheless.

On 12 December 1915 Yuan, supported by his son Yuan Keding, declared himself emperor of a new Empire of China. This sent shock waves throughout China, causing widespread rebellion in numerous provinces. On 25 December former Yunnan governor Cai E, former Jiangxi governor Li Liejun, and Yunnan Gen. Tang Jiyao formed the National Protection Army (Chinese: 護國軍; pinyin: Hùgúojūn) and declared Yunnan independent. Thus began the National Protection War.

Yunnan's declaration of independence also encouraged other southern provinces to declare theirs. Yuan's Beiyang generals, who were already wary of his imperial coronation, did not put up an aggressive campaign against the National Protection Army. On 22 March 1916 Yuan formally repudiated monarchy and stepped down as the first and last emperor of his dynasty. He died on 6 June of that year. Vice President Li Yuanhong assumed the presidency and appointed Beiyang Gen. Duan Qirui as his Premier. Yuan Shikai's imperial ambitions finally ended with the return of republican government.

=== Warlord Era (1916–1928) ===
Flag of the Republic of China, Five-colored flag (1912–1928), means Five Races Under One Union.

Flag of the Republic of China (from 1927), Blue Sky, White Sun with 12 rays, and Wholly Red field.

After Yuan Shikai's death, shifting alliances of regional warlords fought for control of the Beijing government. Despite the fact that various warlords gained control of the government in Beijing during the warlord era, this did not constitute a new era of control or governance, because other warlords did not acknowledge the transitory governments in this period and were a law unto themselves. These military-dominated governments were collectively known as the Beiyang Government. The warlord era is considered by some historians to have ended in 1927.

=== World War I and brief Manchu restoration ===
After Yuan Shikai's death, Li Yuanhong became the President and Duan Qirui became the Premier. The Provisional Constitution was reinstated and the parliament convened. However, Li Yuanhong and Duan Qirui had many conflicts, the most glaring of which was over China's entry into World War I. Since the outbreak of the war, China had remained neutral until the United States urged all neutral countries to join the Allies, as a condemnation of Germany's use of unrestricted submarine warfare. Premier Duan Qirui was particularly interested in joining the Allies as an opportunity to secure loans from Japan to build up his Anhui clique army. The two factions in the parliament engaged in ugly debates regarding the entry of China and, in May 1917, Li Yuanhong dismissed Duan Qirui from his government.

This led provincial military governors loyal to Duan to declare independence and to call for Li Yuanhong to step down as president. Li Yuanhong summoned Zhang Xun to mediate the situation. Zhang Xun had been a general serving the Qing Court and was by this time the military governor of Anhui province. He had his mind on restoring Puyi (Xuantong Emperor) to the imperial throne. Zhang was supplied with funds and weapons through the German legation, which was eager to keep China neutral.

On 1 July 1917, Zhang officially proclaimed the restoration of Qing dynasty and requested that Li Yuanhong give up his presidency, which Li promptly rejected. Duan Qirui led his army and defeated Zhang Xun's restoration forces in Beijing. One of Duan's airplanes bombed the Forbidden City, in what was possibly the first aerial bombardment in East Asia. On July 12 Zhang's forces disintegrated and Duan returned to Beijing.

The Manchu restoration ended almost as soon as it began. During this period of confusion, Vice President Feng Guozhang, also a Beiyang general, assumed the post of Acting President of the republic and took his oath of office in Nanjing. Duan Qirui resumed his post as the Premier. The Zhili clique of Feng Guozhang and the Anhui clique of Duan Qirui emerged as the most powerful cliques following the restoration affair.

Duan Qirui's triumphant return to Beijing essentially made him the most powerful leader in China. Duan dissolved the parliament upon his return and declared war on Germany and Austria-Hungary on 14 August 1917. German and Austro-Hungarian nationals were detained and their assets seized. Around 175,000 Chinese workers volunteered for labor battalions after being enticed with money, some even years before war was declared. They were sent to the Western Front, German East Africa and Mesopotamia and served on supply ships. Some 10,000 died, including over 500 on ships sunk by U-boats. No soldiers were sent overseas, though they did participate with the Allies in the Siberian Intervention under Japanese General Kikuzo Otani.

=== Constitutional Protection War ===
In September Duan's complete disregard for the constitution caused Sun Yat-sen, Cen Chunxuan and the deposed parliament members to establish a new government in Guangzhou and the Constitutional Protection Army (Chinese: 護法軍; pinyin: Hùfǎjūn) to counter Duan's abuse of power. Ironically, Sun Yat-sen's new government was not based on the Provisional Constitution; rather, it was a military government and Sun was its "Grand Commander of the Armed Forces" (Chinese: 大元帥; pinyin: Dàyúanshuài, translated in the Western press as "Generalissimo"). Six southern provinces became part of Sun's Guangzhou military government and repelled Duan's attempt to destroy the Constitutional Protection Army.

The Constitutional Protection War continued through 1918. Many in Sun Yat-sen's Guangzhou government felt his position as the Generalissimo was too exclusionary and promoted a cabinet system to challenge Sun's ultimate authority. As a result, the Guangzhou government was reorganized to elect a seven-member cabinet system, known as the Governing Committee. Sun was once again sidelined by his political opponents and military strongmen. He left for Shanghai following the reorganization. Duan Qirui's Beijing government did not fare much better than Sun's. Some generals in Duan's Anhui Clique and others in the Zhili clique did not want to use force to unify the southern provinces. They felt negotiation was the solution to unify China and forced Duan to resign in October. In addition, many were distressed by Duan's borrowing of huge sums of Japanese money to fund his army to fight internal enemies.

President Feng Guozhang, with his term expiring, was then succeeded by Xu Shichang, who wanted to negotiate with the southern provinces. In February 1919 delegates from the northern and southern provinces convened in Shanghai to discuss postwar situations. However, the meeting broke down over Duan's taking out Japanese loans to fund the Anhui Clique army, and further attempts at negotiation were hampered by the May Fourth Movement. The Constitutional Protection War essentially left China divided along the north–south border.

=== May Fourth Movement ===
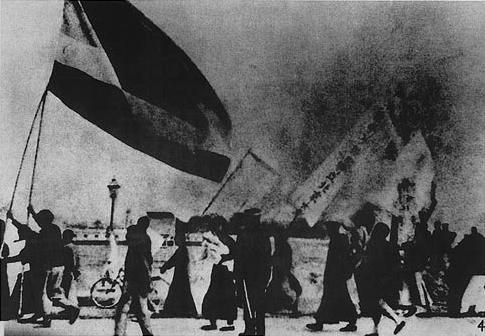
Students in Beijing rallied during the May Fourth Movement.

In 1917 China declared war on Germany in the hope of recovering its lost province, then under Japanese control. On 4 May 1919, there were massive student demonstrations against the Beijing government and Japan. The political fervor, student activism and iconoclastic and reformist intellectual currents set in motion by the patriotic student protest developed into a national awakening known as the May Fourth Movement.

The intellectual milieu in which the May Fourth Movement developed was known as the New Culture Movement and occupied the period 1917–1923. The student demonstrations of 4 May 1919, were the high point of the New Culture Movement, and the terms are often used synonymously. Chinese representatives refused to sign the Treaty of Versailles due to intense pressure from both the student protesters and public opinion.

=== Fight against warlordism and the First United Front ===
The May Fourth Movement helped to rekindle the then-fading cause of republican revolution. In 1917 Sun Yat-sen had become commander-in-chief of a rival military government in Canton in collaboration with southern warlords. In October 1919 he re-established the Kuomintang (KMT) to counter the government in Beijing. The latter, under a succession of warlords, still maintained its facade of legitimacy and its relations with the West.

By 1921 Sun had become president of the southern government. He spent his remaining years trying to consolidate his regime and achieve unity with the north. His efforts to obtain aid from the Western democracies were fruitless, however, and in 1920 he turned to the Soviet Union, which had recently achieved its own revolution. The Soviets sought to befriend the Chinese revolutionists by offering scathing attacks on Western imperialism. For political expediency, though, the Soviet leadership initiated a dual policy of support for both Sun and the newly established Chinese Communist Party (CCP).

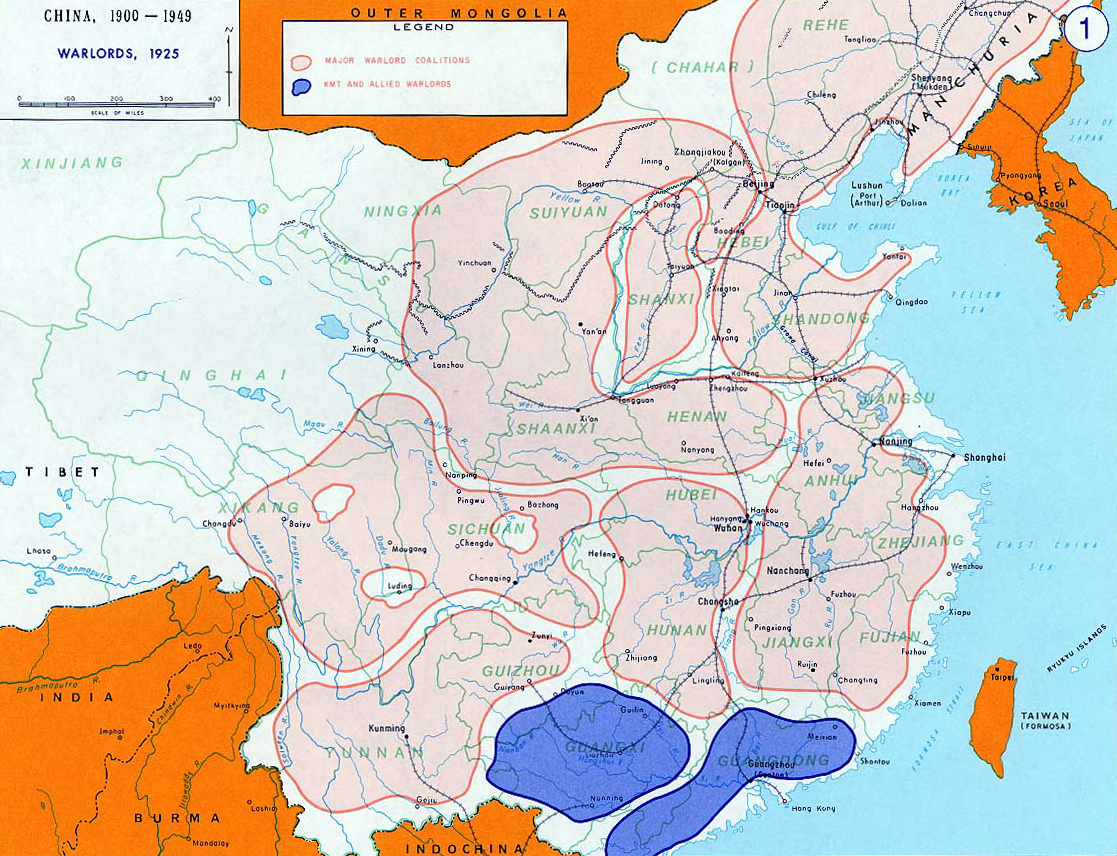
Major Chinese warlord coalitions as of 1925

In 1922 the Kuomintang-warlord alliance in Guangzhou was ruptured, and Sun fled to Shanghai. By then he saw the need to seek Soviet support for his cause. In 1923 a joint statement by Sun and a Soviet representative in Shanghai pledged Soviet assistance for China's national unification. Soviet advisers—the most prominent of whom was an agent of the Comintern, Mikhail Borodin—began to arrive in China in 1923 to aid in the reorganization and consolidation of the Kuomintang along the lines of the Communist Party of the Soviet Union and establish the First United Front. The CCP was under Comintern instructions to cooperate with the Kuomintang, and its members were encouraged to join while maintaining their party identities to form a "bloc within."

The policy of working with the Kuomintang and Chiang Kai-shek had been recommended by the Dutch Communist Henk Sneevliet, chosen in 1923 to be the Comintern representative in China due to his revolutionary experience in the Dutch Indies, where he had a major role in founding the Communist Party of Indonesia (PKI), and who felt that the Chinese communist party was too small and weak to undertake a major effort on its own.

The CCP was still small at the time, having a membership of just 300 in 1921 and only 1,500 by 1925. By contrast, the Kuomintang in 1922 already had 150,000 members. Soviet advisers also helped the Kuomintang set up a political institute to train propagandists in mass mobilization techniques, and in 1923 sent Chiang Kai-shek, one of Sun's lieutenants from Tongmenghui days, for several months' military and political study in Moscow. After Chiang's return in late 1923, he participated in the establishment of the Whampoa Military Academy outside Guangzhou, which was the seat of government under the Kuomintang-CCP alliance. In 1924 Chiang became head of the academy and began the rise to prominence that would make him Sun's successor as head of the Kuomintang and the unifier of all China under the right-wing Nationalist Government.

=== Chiang consolidates power ===
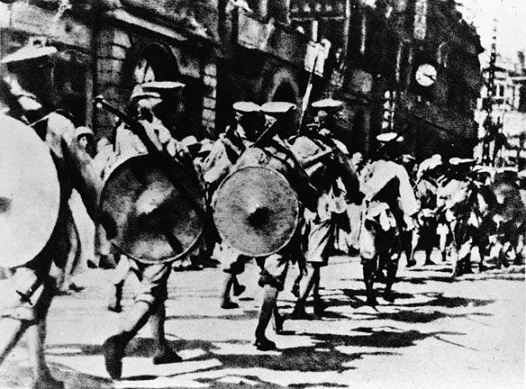
National Revolutionary Army soldiers march into the British concessions in Hubei during the Northern Expedition.

Sun Yat-sen died of cancer in Beijing in March 1925, as the Nationalist movement he had helped to initiate was gaining momentum. During the summer of 1925 Chiang, as commander-in-chief of the National Revolutionary Army, set out on the long-delayed Northern Expedition against the northern warlords. Within nine months half of China had been conquered. By 1926, however, the Kuomintang had divided into left- and right-wing factions, and the Communist bloc within it was also growing.

In March 1926, after thwarting a kidnapping attempt against him (Zhongshan Warship Incident), Chiang abruptly dismissed his Soviet advisers, imposed restrictions on CCP members' participation in the top leadership and emerged as the pre-eminent Kuomintang leader. The Soviet Union, still hoping to prevent a split between Chiang and the CCP, ordered Communist underground activities to facilitate the Northern Expedition, which was finally launched by Chiang from Guangzhou in July 1926.

In early 1927 the Kuomintang-CCP rivalry led to a split in the revolutionary ranks. The CCP and the left wing of the Kuomintang decided to move the seat of the Nationalist government from Guangzhou to Wuhan. Chiang, whose Northern Expedition was proving successful, set his forces to destroying the Shanghai CCP apparatus and established an anti-Communist government at Nanjing in the Shanghai massacre of 1927. There now were three capitals in China: the internationally recognized warlord regime in Beijing; the Communist and left-wing Kuomintang regime at Wuhan; and the right-wing civilian-military regime at Nanjing, which would remain the Kuomintang capital for the next decade.

The Comintern cause appeared bankrupt. A new policy was instituted calling on the CCP to foment armed insurrections in both urban and rural areas in preparation for an expected rising tide of revolution. Unsuccessful attempts were made by Communists to take cities such as Nanchang, Changsha, Shantou and Guangzhou, and an armed rural insurrection, known as the Autumn Harvest Uprising, was staged by peasants in Hunan province. The insurrection was led by Mao Zedong, who would later become chairman of the CCP and head of state of the People's Republic of China.

In mid-1927, however, the CCP's fortunes were at a low ebb. The Communists had been expelled from Wuhan by their left-wing Kuomintang allies, who in turn were toppled by a military regime. By 1928 all of China was at least nominally under Chiang's control, and the Nanjing government received prompt international recognition as the sole legitimate government of China. The Kuomintang government announced that in conformity with Sun Yat-sen's formula for the three stages of revolution—military unification, political tutelage and constitutional democracy—China had reached the end of the first phase and would embark on the second, which would be under Kuomintang direction.

== Nationalist era (1928–1949) ==
=== Nanjing decade (1928–1937) ===
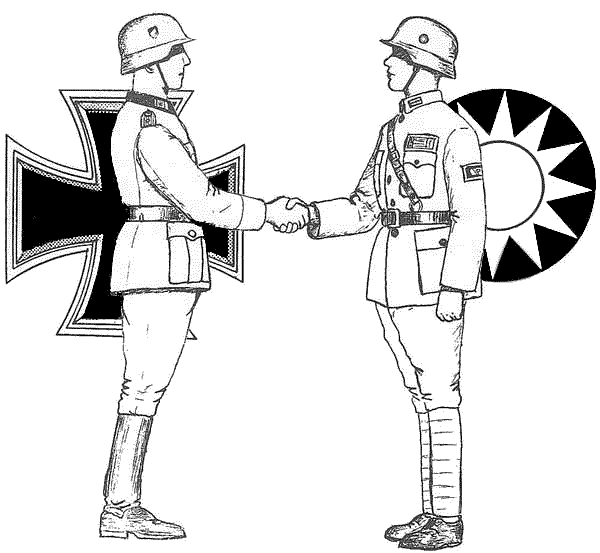
With help from Germany, Chinese industry and its military were improved just prior to the war against Japan.

The "Nanjing Decade" of 1928-37 was one of consolidation and accomplishment under the leadership of the Nationalists, with a mixed but generally positive record in the economy, social progress, development of democracy and cultural creativity. Some of the harsh aspects of foreign concessions and privileges in China were moderated through diplomacy. In May 1930 the government regained the right to set its tariff, which before then had been set by the foreign powers.

The Nationalist Government also acted energetically to modernize the legal and penal systems, stabilize prices, amortize debts, reform the banking and currency systems, build railroads and highways, improve public health facilities, legislate against traffic in narcotics and augment industrial and agricultural production. On 3 November 1935, the government instituted the fiat currency (fapi) reform, immediately stabilizing prices and also raising revenues for the government. Great strides also were made in education and, in an effort to help unify Chinese society, in a program to popularize Modern Standard Chinese and overcome other varieties of Chinese. Newspapers, magazines and book publishing flourished, and the widespread establishment of communications facilities further encouraged a sense of unity and pride among the people.

Laws were passed and campaigns mounted to promote the rights of women. A generation of educated and professional new women emerged after the inclusion of girls in the state school system and after women students were admitted at the University of Beijing in 1920, and in the 1931 Civil Code, women were given equal inheritance rights, banned forced marriage and gave women the right to control their own money and initiate divorce. No nationally unified women's movement could organize until China was unified under the Kuomintang Government in Nanjing in 1928; women's suffrage was finally included in the new Constitution of 1936, although the constitution was not implemented until 1947.

The ease and speed of communication also allowed a focus on social problems, including those of the villages. The Rural Reconstruction Movement was one of many which took advantage of the new freedom to raise social consciousness. On the other hand, political freedom was considerably curtailed because of the Kuomintang's one-party domination through "political tutelage" and often violent means in shutting down anti-government protests.

During this time, a series of massive wars took place in western China, including the Kumul Rebellion, the Sino-Tibetan War and the Soviet invasion of Xinjiang. Although the central government was nominally in control of the entire country during this period, large areas of China remained under the semi-autonomous rule of local warlords, provincial military leaders or warlord coalitions. Nationalist rule was strongest in the eastern regions around the capital Nanjing, but regional militarists such as Feng Yuxiang and Yan Xishan retained considerable local authority. The Central Plains War in 1930, the Japanese aggression in 1931 and the Red Army's Long March in 1934 led to more power for the central government, but there continued to be foot-dragging and even outright defiance, as in the Fujian Rebellion of 1933–34.

=== Second Sino-Japanese War (1937–1945) ===
Few Chinese had any illusions about Japanese desires on China. Hungry for raw materials and pressed by a growing population, Japan initiated the seizure of Manchuria on 18 September 1931 and established ex-Qing emperor Puyi as head of the puppet state of Manchukuo in 1932. The loss of Manchuria, and its vast potential for industrial development and war industries, was a blow to the Kuomintang economy. The League of Nations, established at the end of World War I, was unable to act in the face of the Japanese defiance.

The Japanese began to push from south of the Great Wall into northern China and the coastal provinces. Chinese fury against Japan was predictable, but anger was also directed against Chiang and the Nanjing government, which at the time was more preoccupied with anti-Communist extermination campaigns than with resisting the Japanese invaders. The importance of "internal unity before external danger" was forcefully brought home in December 1936, when Chiang Kai-shek, in an event now known as the Xi'an Incident, was kidnapped by Zhang Xueliang and forced to ally with the Communists against the Japanese in the Second Kuomintang-CCP United Front against Japan.

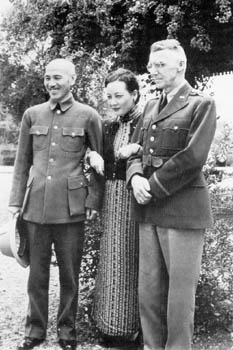
Chiang Kai-shek and Madame Chiang Kai-shek with Gen. Joseph Stilwell in Burma (1942).

The Chinese resistance stiffened after 7 July 1937, when a clash occurred between Chinese and Japanese troops outside Beijing (then named Beiping) near the Marco Polo Bridge. This skirmish led to open, though undeclared, warfare between China and Japan. Shanghai fell after a three-month battle during which Japan suffered extensive casualties, both in its army and navy. The capital of Nanjing fell in December 1937. It was followed by an onslaught of mass murders and rapes known as the Nanjing Massacre. The national capital was briefly at Wuhan, then removed in an epic retreat to Chongqing, the seat of government until 1945. In 1940 the collaborationist Wang Jingwei regime was set up with its capital in Nanjing, proclaiming itself the legitimate "Republic of China" in opposition to Chiang Kai-shek's government, though its claims were significantly hampered due to its nature as a Japanese puppet state controlling limited amounts of territory, along with its subsequent defeat at the end of the war.

The United Front between the Kuomintang and CCP took place with salutary effects for the beleaguered CCP, despite Japan's steady territorial gains in northern China, the coastal regions and the rich Yangtze River Valley in central China. After 1940 conflicts between the Kuomintang and Communists became more frequent in the areas not under Japanese control. The entrance of the United States into the Pacific War after 1941 changed the nature of their relationship. The Communists expanded their influence wherever opportunities presented themselves through mass organizations, administrative reforms and the land- and tax-reform measures favoring the peasants and the spread of their organizational network, while the Kuomintang attempted to neutralize the spread of Communist influence. Meanwhile, northern China was infiltrated politically by Japanese politicians in Manchukuo using facilities such as Wei Huang Gong.

In 1945 the Republic of China emerged from the war nominally a great military power but actually a nation economically prostrate and on the verge of all-out civil war. The economy deteriorated, sapped by the military demands of foreign war and internal strife, by spiraling inflation and by Nationalist profiteering, speculation and hoarding. Starvation came in the wake of the war, and millions were rendered homeless by floods and the unsettled conditions in many parts of the country. The situation was further complicated by an Allied agreement at the Yalta Conference in February 1945 that brought Soviet troops into Manchuria to hasten the termination of war against Japan. Although the Chinese had not been present at Yalta, they had been consulted and had agreed to have the Soviets enter the war in the belief that the Soviet Union would deal only with the Kuomintang government.

After the end of the war in August 1945, the Nationalist Government moved back to Nanjing. With American help, Nationalist troops moved to take the Japanese surrender in North China. The Soviet Union, as part of the Yalta agreement allowing a Soviet sphere of influence in Manchuria, dismantled and removed more than half the industrial equipment left there by the Japanese. The Soviet presence in northeast China enabled the Communists to move in long enough to arm themselves with the equipment surrendered by the withdrawing Japanese army. The problems of rehabilitating the formerly Japanese-occupied areas and of reconstructing the nation from the ravages of a protracted war were staggering.

=== Chinese Civil War (1946–1949) ===
During World War II the United States emerged as a major player in Chinese affairs. As an ally it embarked in late 1941 on a program of massive military and financial aid to the hard-pressed Nationalist Government. In January 1943 the United States and Britain led the way in revising their treaties with China, bringing to an end a century of unequal treaty relations. Within a few months a new agreement was signed between the United States and the Republic of China for the stationing of American troops in China for the common war effort against Japan. In December 1943 the Chinese Exclusion Acts of the 1880s and subsequent laws enacted by the United States Congress to restrict Chinese immigration into the United States were repealed.

The wartime policy of the United States was initially to help China become a strong ally and a stabilizing force in postwar East Asia. As the conflict between the Kuomintang and the Communists intensified, however, the United States sought unsuccessfully to reconcile the rival forces for a more effective anti-Japanese war effort. Toward the end of the war, United States Marines were used to hold Beiping (Beijing) and Tianjin against a possible Soviet incursion, and logistic support was given to Kuomintang forces in north and northeast China.

Through the mediating influence of the United States a military truce was arranged in January 1946, but battles between the Kuomintang and Communists soon resumed. Public opinion of the administrative incompetence of the Republic of China government was escalated and incited by the Communists in the nationwide student protest against mishandling of a rape accusation in early 1947 and another national protest against monetary reforms later that year. Realizing that no American efforts short of large-scale armed intervention could stop the coming war, the United States withdrew the American mission, headed by Gen. George Marshall, in early 1947. The Chinese Civil War became more widespread; battles raged not only for territories but also for the allegiance of cross-sections of the population. The United States aided the Nationalists with massive economic loans and weapons but no combat support.

The Nationalists' retreat to Taipei: after the Nationalists lost Nanjing they next moved to Guangzhou (Canton), then to Chongqing, Chengdu and Xichang before arriving in Taipei.

Belatedly, the Republic of China government sought to enlist popular support through internal reforms. The effort was in vain, however, because of rampant government corruption and the accompanying political and economic chaos. By late 1948 the Kuomintang position was bleak. The demoralized and undisciplined Kuomintang troops proved to be no match for the motivated and disciplined Communist People's Liberation Army, earlier known as the Red Army. The Communists were well established in the north and northeast.

Although the Kuomintang had an advantage in numbers of men and weapons, controlled a much larger territory and population than their adversaries and enjoyed considerable international support, they were exhausted by the long war with Japan and in-fighting among various generals. They were also losing the propaganda war to the Communists, with a population weary of Kuomintang corruption and yearning for peace.

In January 1949 Beiping was taken by the Communists without a fight, and its name changed back to Beijing. Between April and November, major cities passed from Kuomintang to Communist control with minimal resistance. In most cases the surrounding countryside and small towns had come under Communist influence long before the cities. Finally, on 1 October 1949, Communists founded the People's Republic of China.

After 1 October 1949 Chiang Kai-shek and a few hundred thousand Republic of China troops and two million refugees, predominantly from the government and business community, fled from mainland China to the island of Taiwan; there remained in China itself only isolated pockets of resistance. On 7 December 1949 Chiang proclaimed Taipei, Taiwan, the temporary capital of the Republic of China.

During the civil war both the Nationalists and Communists carried out mass atrocities with millions of non-combatants killed by both sides during the civil war. Benjamin Valentino has estimated atrocities in the Chinese Civil War resulted in the death of between 1.8 million and 3.5 million people between 1927 and 1949. Atrocities include deaths from forced conscription and massacres.

== Authoritarian era (1949–1991) ==
=== Cross-straits relations and international position in 1949–1970 ===
At the end of 1943 the Cairo Declaration was issued, including among its clauses that all territories of China—including Formosa (Taiwan)—that Japan had occupied would be returned to the Republic of China. This was reiterated in the Potsdam Declaration, issued in 1945. Later that year World War II ended, and Japan accepted the Potsdam Declaration, surrendering unconditionally. The Supreme Commander of the Allied Forces ordered that Japanese forces in Taiwan surrender to the government of the Republic of China, which acted as a representative of allied powers. The United States and the United Kingdom—the other two participants of the Cairo Declaration—however, regard that the Cairo Declaration and the Potsdam Declaration are merely statements of intention and have no binding force of law.

On 25 October 1945, in Taipei Zhongshan Hall, the Japanese government in Taiwan surrendered to Chen Yi, the representative of the Republic of China, which was the representative of the Allied Powers. The Republic of China started to administer Taiwan. In 1951 Japan formally signed the Treaty of San Francisco but, due to the unclear situation of the Chinese civil war, the peace treaty did not clearly indicate to whom Taiwan's sovereignty belonged. In the second article of the 1952 Treaty of Taipei, following the Treaty of San Francisco, Japan reiterated its abandonment of sovereignty of Taiwan, the Pescadores, the Spratlys and the Paracels in the Treaty of San Francisco.

The People's Republic of China (PRC) and the Republic of China (ROC) continued a state of war until 1979. In October 1949 a PRC attempt to take the ROC-controlled island of Kinmen was thwarted in the Battle of Kuningtou, halting the PLA advance towards Taiwan. The Communists' other amphibious operations of 1950 were more successful: they led to the Communist conquest of Hainan Island in April 1950, capture of Wanshan Islands off the Guangdong coast (May–August 1950) and of Zhoushan Island off Zhejiang (May 1950).

In June 1949 the ROC declared a "closure" of all mainland China ports and its navy attempted to intercept all foreign ships. The closure covered from a point north of the mouth of the Min River in Fujian province to the mouth of the Liao River in Manchuria. Since mainland China's railroad network was underdeveloped, north–south trade depended heavily on sea lanes. ROC naval activity also caused severe hardship for mainland China fishermen.

After losing mainland China, a group of approximately 12,000 KMT soldiers escaped to Burma and continued launching guerrilla attacks into south China. Their leader, Gen. Li Mi, was paid a salary by the ROC government and given the nominal title of Governor of Yunnan. Initially the United States supported these remnants and the Central Intelligence Agency provided them with aid. After the Burmese government appealed to the United Nations in 1953, however, the U.S. began pressuring the ROC to withdraw its loyalists. By the end of 1954 nearly 6,000 soldiers had left Burma and Li Mi declared his army disbanded. However, thousands remained, and the ROC continued to supply and command them, even secretly supplying reinforcements at times.

During the Korean War, some captured Communist Chinese soldiers, many of whom were originally KMT soldiers, were repatriated to Taiwan rather than mainland China. A KMT guerrilla force continued to operate cross-border raids into southwestern China in the early 1950s. The ROC government launched a number of air bombing raids into key coastal cities of mainland China such as Shanghai.

Though viewed as a military liability by the United States, the ROC viewed its remaining islands in Fujian as vital for any future campaign to defeat the PRC and retake mainland China. On 3 September 1954, the First Taiwan Strait Crisis began when the PLA started shelling Quemoy and threatened to take the Dachen Islands. On 20 January 1955, the PLA took nearby Yijiangshan Island, with the entire ROC garrison of 720 troops killed or wounded defending the island. On January 24 of the same year, the United States Congress passed the Formosa Resolution authorizing the President to defend the ROC's offshore islands. The First Taiwan Straits crisis ended in March 1955 when the PLA ceased its bombardment. The crisis was brought to a close during the Bandung Conference.

The Second Taiwan Strait Crisis began on 23 August 1958, with air and naval engagements between the PRC and the ROC military forces, leading to intense artillery bombardment of Quemoy (by the PRC) and Amoy (by the ROC), and ended on November of the same year. PLA patrol boats blockaded the islands, keeping out ROC supply ships. Though the United States rejected Chiang Kai-shek's proposal to bomb mainland China artillery batteries, it quickly moved to supply fighter jets and anti-aircraft missiles to the ROC. It also provided amphibious assault ships to land supplies, as a sunken ROC naval vessel was blocking the harbor. On September 7 the United States escorted a convoy of ROC supply ships and the PRC refrained from firing. On October 25 the PRC announced an "even-day ceasefire" — the PLA would only shell Quemoy on odd-numbered days. Despite the end of the hostilities, the two sides have never signed any agreement or treaty to officially end the war.

After the 1950s, the "war" became more symbolic than real, represented by on again, off again artillery bombardment towards and from Kinmen. In later years, live shells were replaced with propaganda sheets. The bombardment finally ceased in 1979 after the establishment of diplomatic relations between the People's Republic of China and the United States.

During this period, movement of people and goods virtually ceased between PRC- and ROC-controlled territories. There were occasional defectors. One high-profile defector was Justin Yifu Lin, who swam across the Kinmen strait to mainland China on 17 May 1979, and ended up serving as Chief Economist and Senior Vice President of the World Bank from 2008 to 2012.

Most observers expected Chiang's government to eventually fall in response to a Communist invasion of Taiwan, and the United States initially showed no interest in supporting Chiang's government in its final stand. Things changed radically with the onset of the Korean War in June 1950. At this point, allowing a total Communist victory over Chiang became politically impossible in the United States, and President Harry S. Truman ordered the United States Seventh Fleet into the Taiwan Strait to prevent the ROC and PRC from attacking each other.

After the ROC complained to the United Nations against the Soviet Union supporting the PRC, the UN General Assembly Resolution 505 was adopted on 1 February 1952 to condemn the Soviet Union.

=== Tensions between Mainlanders and people of Taiwan ===
After World War II, General Order No. 1 ordered the forces of the Empire of Japan in Taiwan to surrender to Generalissimo Chiang Kai-shek. The Republic of China appointed Chen Yi as the Chief Executive of Taiwan. He arrived in Taiwan on 24 October 1945 and received the last Japanese governor, Ando Rikichi, who signed the document of surrender on the next day. On the next day, Chen Yi proclaimed Taiwan Retrocession Day. The validity of the proclamation is subject to some debate however, with some supporters of Taiwan independence arguing that it is invalid, and that the date simply marks the start of a military occupation by the Republic of China.

During the immediate postwar period, the Chinese Kuomintang administration on Taiwan was inept and corrupt, while soldiers were breaking the laws. Many Taiwanese people were disillusioned with the incoming Kuomintang administration, which proved to be as harsh as Japanese imperial rule. Anti-mainlander violence flared on 28 February 1947 following an accidental shooting of a cigarette vendor by the police.

The resulting 28 February incident became a pivotal event in the shaping of modern Taiwanese identity. For several weeks after the incident, many Taiwanese rebelled, participating in island-wide riots protesting the government's corruption and harsh rule. The governor, Chen Yi, while negotiating with leaders of the protest movement, called for troops from mainland China. The Kuomintang, allegedly fearing a Communist infiltration, assembled a large military force to quell the disturbance in Taiwan, in the process killing many and imprisoning thousands of others. Many of the Taiwanese who had formed home rule groups under the Japanese were the victims of the incident, as were civilian mainlanders who bore the brunt of vigilante retaliation.

This was followed by martial law and the "White Terror" in which many thousands of people were imprisoned or executed for their political opposition to the Kuomintang. Many victims of the white terror were Taiwanese elite—political leaders, wealthier families, intellectuals, etc. In addition, mainlanders were not spared either, as many had real or perceived associations with communists before they came to Taiwan. For example, some mainlanders who had joined book clubs in mainland China, deemed leftist by the government, were liable to be arrested and many served long prison sentences for these real or perceived threats.

Martial law, among other things, included sedition laws against supporters of communism or Taiwanese independence, leading to very substantial political repression. It also prohibited the formation of new parties (though opposition figures could run as independents or tangwai). Second, because of the ROC's claim to rule all of China, the vast majority of the seats in the Legislative Yuan (parliament) and National Assembly (electoral college for the president, now abolished) were held by those elected from mainland China constituencies in 1947 and 1948. The regime argued that these legislators should keep their seats until elections in their original constituencies were possible. Although the KMT passed measures on elections in 1972 intended to increase Taiwanese representation in these bodies, the huge majorities of senior legislators continued through 1990, guaranteeing KMT control whether or not the party won on election day. More informally, the long-term residents of Taiwan prior to the late 1940s remained distinctly under-represented in the top ranks of government and the party through the early 1990s, suggesting a significant limit to democratization.

=== Economic developments ===
Partially with the help of the China Aid Act of 1948 and the Sino-American Joint Commission on Rural Reconstruction, the Republic of China government implemented a land reform program on Taiwan during the 1950s. Land was given to small farmers, with the property's prior owners compensated with commodities certificates and stock in state-owned industries. These rural reforms, such as the 375 rent reduction program, were never implemented with much force in mainland China but were very successful in Taiwan.

Overall, although the reforms left some large landowners impoverished, others turned their compensation into capital and started commercial and industrial enterprises. These entrepreneurs were to become Taiwan's first industrial capitalists. Together with refugee businessmen from mainland China, they managed Taiwan's transition from an agricultural to a commercial, industrial economy.

Taiwan's phenomenal economic development earned it a spot as one of the Four Asian Tigers, along with Hong Kong, Singapore and South Korea, though as of late, much work remains in the ongoing process of privatization of state-owned industries and in financial sector reforms.

=== Diplomatic setbacks ===
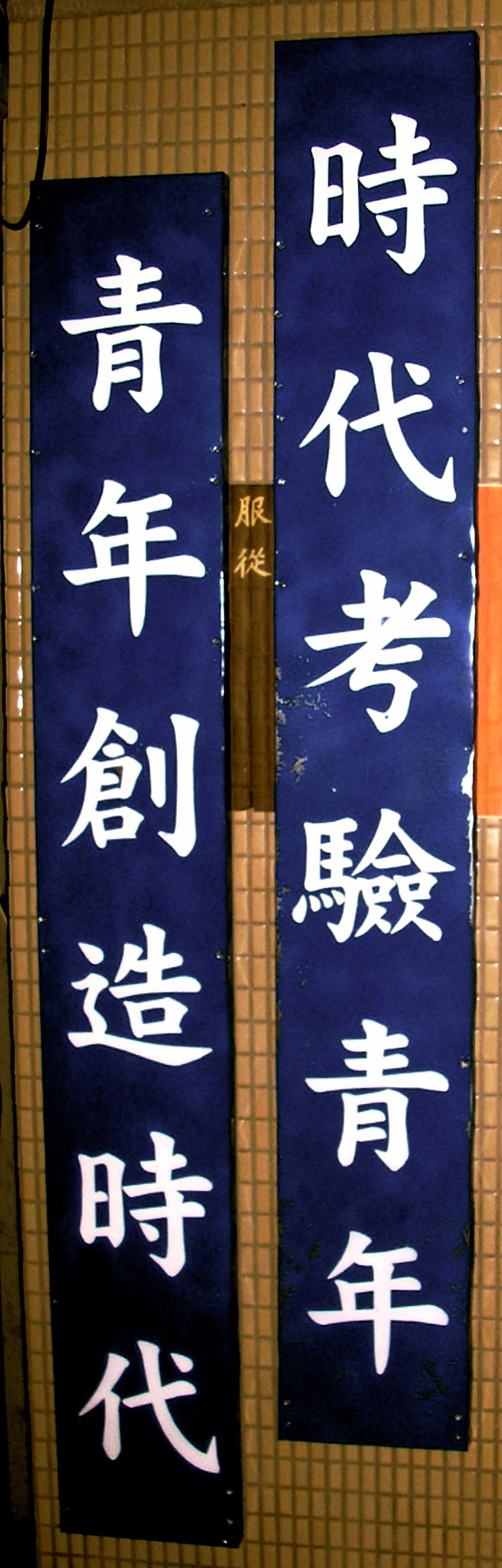
1960s ROC slogan: "Challenging times test the youth. The youth create the era."

The 1970s saw many switches in diplomatic recognition from the Republic of China to the People's Republic of China. After World War II, the Republic of China had been one of the founding members in the United Nations and held China's seat on the Security Council until 1971, when it was expelled by General Assembly Resolution 2758 and replaced in all UN organs with the People's Republic of China government. (Multiple attempts by the Republic of China to re-join the UN have not made it past committee. See China and the United Nations.) Since the 1980s, the number of nations officially recognizing the Republic of China has decreased to 19.

The People's Republic of China refuses to maintain diplomatic relations with any government which formally recognizes the Republic of China, leading to a complex political status of Taiwan (see also one China policy and foreign relations of the Republic of China). United States troops were stationed in Taiwan after the victory of the Communists in mainland China in order to aid in the defense of Taiwan against invasion by the People's Republic of China. The United States military continued to be stationed in Taiwan until diplomatic relations were broken with the Republic of China in 1979 but to this day maintains a significant intelligence presence.

=== Events after 1971 ===
On 5 April 1975, Chiang Kai-shek died at the age of 87. A few years later, the Kaohsiung Incident took place as seeds of dissension had begun against authoritarian rule in Taiwan which paved way for democratization of Taiwan.

The March 1987 Lieyu massacre involved the ROC military that killed 19 Vietnamese boat people. Four months later, martial law in Taiwan ended and Chiang Ching-kuo, who died in 1988, was succeeded by Lee Teng-hui, the first native Taiwanese president, which began Taiwan's transition to democracy starting with the 1990 Wild Lily student movement, followed by the repealing of the Temporary Provisions in 1991 that culminated with the first direct elections that occurred in 1992.

== Democratic era (1991–present) ==
=== Democratic reforms ===
The Republic of China entered into the development phase of constitutional democracy with the promulgation of the Constitution of the Republic of China in 1947. Subsequently, the National Revolutionary Army was also renamed as Republic of China Armed Forces and was nationalized. However, due to the Chinese Civil War, the Temporary Provisions Effective During the Period of Communist Rebellion was passed as amendment to the Constitution of the Republic of China. This established martial law in Taiwan and curtailed civil liberties and democracy. The official rationale for the Provisions was the ongoing Chinese Civil War and ROC was effectively under the military rule of the KMT during the period of mobilization.

However, with the demise of the Kuomintang one-party system and democratization movement during the 1980s, the martial law was eventually lifted in 1987 and provisions were eventually rescinded in 1991. Constitutional democracy was eventually restored in ROC after 1987.

When the Republic of China relocated to Taiwan in 1949, besides Kuomintang, the Chinese Youth Party (中國青年黨) and Chinese Democratic Social Party (中國民主社會黨) were the only legal political parties in Taiwan. The other established parties operated under the Tangwai movement.

Even though Chiang Kai-shek operated an autocratic government: as part of securing Taiwan, he also slowly began democratization progress in Taiwan, beginning with the elections of local offices. He also reformed the top Kuomintang leadership, transforming the party from a democratic centralist organization to one with many factions, each with differing opinions. Chiang Ching-kuo, succeeding his father Chiang Kai-shek, accelerated to liberalize the political system in Taiwan.

Events such as the Kaohsiung Incident in 1979 highlighted the need for change and groups like Amnesty International were mobilizing a campaign against the government and President Chiang Ching-kuo. Chiang Ching-kuo, although a mainlander, pronounced that he was also a Taiwanese and also introduced many native-born Taiwanese people into top echelons of the party. He also named Lee Teng-hui, a native-born Taiwanese, as his vice president and likely successor. In 1986, the permission to form new political parties was granted, and the Democratic Progressive Party (DPP) was inaugurated as the first opposition party.

However, a political crisis appeared imminent as the Ministry of Justice filed charges against the DPP for violating martial law restrictions, but President Chiang defused it by announcing that martial law would end and that new political parties could be formed as long as they supported the Republican Constitution and renounced both communism and Taiwan Independence. The lifting of Martial Law Decree and the ban on veterans to visit their mainland China relatives was approved in 1987; the removal of the ban on registration of new newspapers in 1988 was also a historical event.

After the 1988 death of Chiang Ching-kuo, his successor Lee Teng-hui continued to hand more government authority over to the ethnically Taiwanese and to democratize the government. In 1990, Lee held the National Affairs Conference which led to the abolishment of the national emergency period the following year and paved the way for both the total re-election for the National Assembly in 1991 and the Legislative Yuan in 1992. Full democracy in the sense that citizens are able to select their legislators, not just local officials, in free and fair elections was achieved in 1991 when the senior legislators were forced to retire. In 1994, again under the urging of President Lee, the presidency of the Republic of China was changed via constitutional revision into a position popularly elected by the people within the Free area of the Republic of China.

Under Lee, Taiwan underwent a process of localization in which local culture and history was promoted over a pan-China viewpoint. Lee's reforms included printing banknotes from the Central Bank rather than the Provincial Bank of Taiwan and "freezing" the Taiwan Provincial Government (i.e., stripping the provincial government of much of its powers and merging those powers into either the central government's powers or local governments' powers without abolishing the provincial government altogether). Restrictions on the use of Hokkien in the broadcast media and in schools were lifted as well.

However, democratization had its problems. During the early stages of the process, political parties were still banned, but independent candidates, some including those who had splintered off from the Kuomintang, were allowed to run for offices, provided that they would not receive any campaign funding from the party. As a result, many of these candidates resorted to borrowing money from businessmen, local elite, or even gangsters, in exchange for political and economic favors. This was the beginning of the "black gold" phenomena in Taiwan in which dishonest politicians were backed by businessmen and criminal elements at the expense of the society. In opposition to this, some former Kuomintang members formed the New Party to combat the Kuomintang, which had liberalized but had also introduced widespread corruption.

Another stage was reached when the first direct elections for the powerful president were held in 1996. Lee ran as the incumbent in the ROC's first direct presidential election against DPP candidate and former dissident, Peng Ming-min, which prompted the People's Republic of China to conduct a series of missile tests in the Taiwan Strait to intimidate the ROC electorate. The aggressive tactic prompted United States President Bill Clinton to invoke the Taiwan Relations Act and dispatch an aircraft carrier into the region off Taiwan's southern coast to monitor the situation.

=== Political transition ===
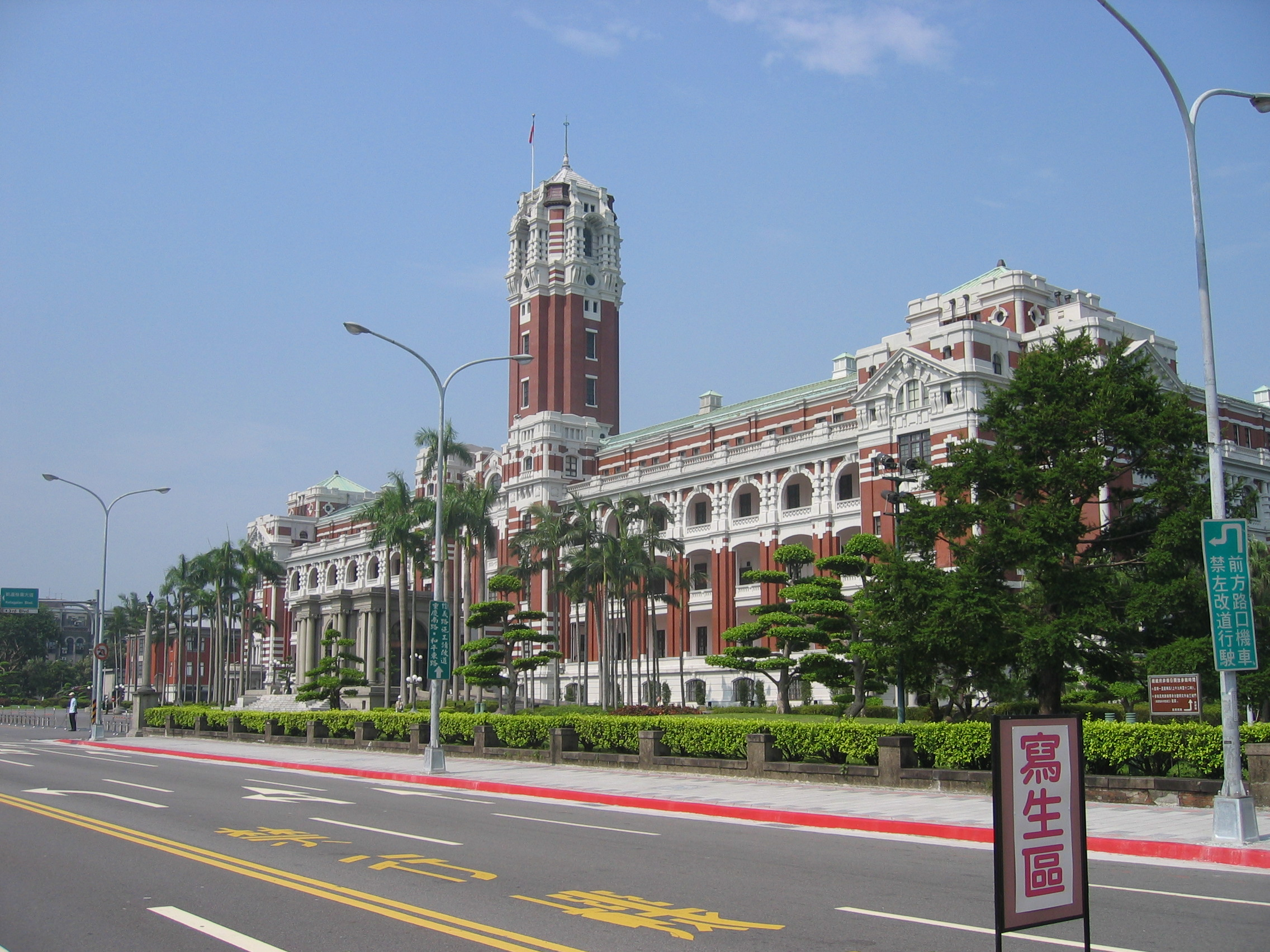
The Presidential Building in Taipei

The 2000 presidential election marked the end of the Kuomintang's status as the ruling party. Opposition DPP candidate Chen Shui-bian won a three-way race that saw the Pan-Blue vote split by independent James Soong (formerly of the Kuomintang) and Kuomintang candidate Lien Chan. Chan garnered 39% of the vote. After the election, Soong formed the People First Party (PFP).

Chen Shui-bian was re-elected by a narrow 0.2% of the vote the 2004 presidential election over Kuomintang Chairman Lien, who had PFP Chairman Soong as his running mate. On the day before the election, both Chen and Vice President Annette Lu were shot while campaigning in Tainan. Their injuries were not life-threatening, but the incident is believed by Pan-Blue to have gained them enough sympathy to influence the result.

That incident might also have given president Chen the ability of declaring martial emergency, which allegedly prevented the police and military, which were strongly Pan-Blue, from voting. Lien refused to concede, alleging voting irregularities. Kuomintang and PFP supporters held mass protests throughout the following weeks. Subsequently, Kuomintang and PFP took the case to the court. The High Court ordered a recount and found no evidence to support the accusation made by Kuomintang and PFP. The Court decided that the election result was legitimate and valid.

During the legislative elections held on 8 December 2004, the Kuomintang-PFP dominated Pan-Blue alliance gained a slim majority in the elections which resulted in President Chen resigning as DPP chairman. The cabinet of Premier Yu Shyi-kun resigned, and Frank Hsieh assumed premiership on 25 January 2005.

In a move that some saw as a reaction to Chen's re-election, the People's Republic of China enacted a proposed anti-secession law that allows the use of force on Taiwan and the Republic of China government if it formally declares independence. However, this law was met with overwhelming protest from nearly all political parties and public figures of the Republic of China and disapproval from the western countries. Negotiations in January in Macau between the aviation authorities from both the Republic of China and People's Republic of China resulted in direct-cross strait charter flights between mainland China and Taiwan during the Lunar New Year Period.

In 2005, President Chen and PFP Chairman Soong held a summit and the independence-leaning president indicated that eventual reunification with mainland China would be an option. Against the anti-secession law proposed by the People's Republic of China, President Chen held a video conference with the European Parliament in Brussels urging the European Union not to lift the arms embargo on the People's Republic of China.

During most of Chen's second term, Kuomintang and PFP together hold a pan-Blue majority in the legislature. Among the many items that have made little progress due to the political stalemate are a stalled arms procurement bill, which would advance defense capabilities of the Republic of China through the purchase of weaponry, such as sub-hunting P-3 Orions, from the US government, and banking reform legislation, which would help in the consolidation of the many banks in the Republic of China, none of which hold even 10% shares of the local market. The president of the Republic of China, unlike the president of the United States, does not wield veto power, providing him with little to no leverage in negotiating with an opposition legislature, regardless of how slim the majority.

The constitution was further amended in 2005, creating a two-vote electoral system, with single member plurality seats and proportional representative seats, and abolishing the National Assembly, transferring most of its former powers to the Legislative Yuan, and leaving further amendment voting to public referendums. The issue of formally declaring the independence of Taiwan is also a constant constitutional question. Arms purchases from the United States are still a controversial political question, with the Pan-Green Coalition camp favoring the purchase, and the Pan-Blue Coalition opposing it.

Recent allegations about corruption inside the First Family had led to three recall motions votes in the Legislative Yuan aimed at ousting President Chen Shui-bian. All of them had failed, because legislators voted according to political lines and the Pan-Blue Coalition lacked the two-thirds majority required to complete the process. The First Lady, Wu Shu-chen, was prosecuted for corruption, namely illegally using state funds for personal purposes.

The president faced similar accusations as his wife, but was protected from prosecution by presidential immunity. He had promised to resign if his wife was found guilty. However, after his wife fainted in the preparation hearing, she had sought and obtained absence of leave from the Court 16 times citing health concerns before the end of Chen's term.

In December 2006, municipal and mayoral elections were held in Taipei City and Kaohsiung City. The KMT retained a majority in Taipei, while the DPP and the KMT obtained very close results in Kaohsiung. Huang Jun-ying lost to Chen Chu by a margin of 0.14 percent, making Chen Chu the first female mayor of a special municipality in the Republic of China. In 2007, the ROC applied for membership in the United Nations under the name "Taiwan", and is rejected by the General Assembly.

In the 2008 presidential election, KMT candidate Ma Ying-jeou defeated DPP candidate Frank Hsieh with 58.48% of the vote. Ma ran on a platform supporting friendlier relations with mainland China and economic reforms. He was re-elected in 2012 with 51% of the vote, against 46.3% for DPP's Tsai Ing-wen and 2.7% for PFP's James Soong.

In the 2016 presidential election, DPP candidate Tsai Ing-wen defeated KMT candidate Eric Chu, becoming the first female president of the Republic of China.

In January 2020, Tsai Ing-wen was re-elected in the presidential election. In the parliamentary election President Tsai's Democratic Progressive Party (DPP) won majority 61 out of 113 seats. The Kuomintang (KMT) won 38 seats.

In January 2024, William Lai Ching-te of the ruling Democratic Progressive Party won Taiwan’s presidential elections. However, no party won a majority in the simultaneous Taiwan's legislative election for the first time since 2004, meaning 51 seats for the Democratic Progressive Party (DPP), 52 seats for the Kuomintang (KMT), and the Taiwan People's Party (TPP) secured eight seats.

== See also ==
- Kuomintang
- Political status of Taiwan
- Foreign relations of the Republic of China
- Economic history of China (1912–49)
- List of leaders of the Republic of China
- Conservatism in Taiwan

General:

- History of China
- History of the People's Republic of China
- Timeline of Taiwanese history
- Timeline of Chinese history
- Timeline of events preceding World War II in Asia
- Timeline of Republic of China history

Preceded by Qing dynasty	Governing authority of mainland China; 1912–1949	Succeeded by People's Republic of China
Preceded by Empire of Japan	Governing authority of Taiwan; 1945–	Succeeded by Republic of China
