= Reorganisation loan affair =

Political scandal in the Republic of China

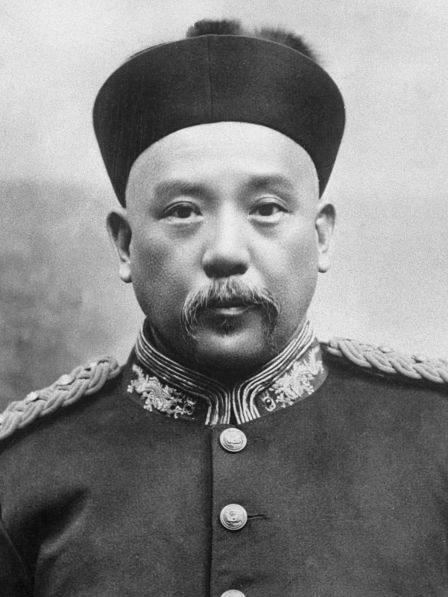
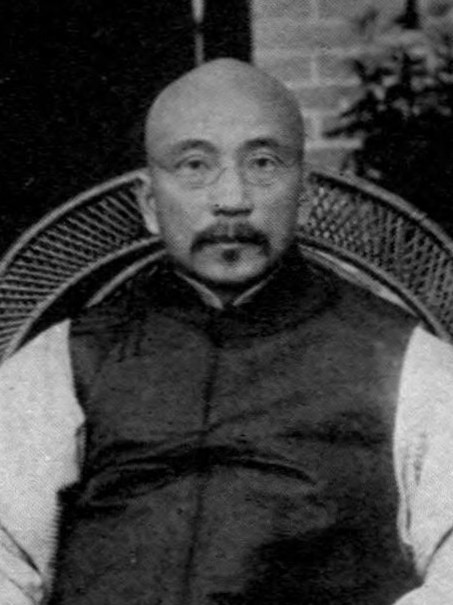
Chinese provisional President Yuan Shikai (left) and Premier Tang Shaoyi (right)

The Reorganisation loan affair (Chinese: 善後大借款; pinyin: Shànhòu dà jièkuǎn) was a series of political incidents in the Republic of China between March 1912 and 1913. It began when Yuan Shikai, the provisional President of the country, attempted to resolve financial difficulties in the Beiyang government by taking significant loans from the China Consortium of foreign banks without the approval of the National Assembly (the parliament). The loan, amounting to £25 million (3.08 billion pounds or 4 billion dollars in 2021 value, inflation-adjusted), forced the Beiyang government to cede partial control of its national treasury to foreign ownership as leverage.

Yuan's decision to obtain the loan generated controversy in China, especially within the National Assembly and the government, as the terms negotiated to obtain the loan were considered a national humiliation. Several cabinet members, including Premier Tang Shaoyi, resigned in protest against Yuan's decision. Along with other political incidents, notably the assassination of Song Jiaoren, the event caused a large-scale political crisis that lasted until 1914, provoking the Kuomintang to launch the Second Revolution in July 1913, which ended in failure.

== History ==
=== Background ===
In 1842, the Treaty of Nanking, signed between the Qing dynasty and the United Kingdom to end the First Opium War, forced the Qing imperial government to cede its tariff autonomy as a guarantee for British reparations. The imperial treasury lost most of its revenue; and by 1911, the government could only use balances from the repayments, known as guan yu (Chinese: 关余; pinyin: guānyú, a Chinese abbreviation for 'tariff balances') to allocate spending for its national budget. After the collapse of the imperial government, there was not enough guan yu to fund the new Republican government. Attempts by the new government to regain control of its tariff were unsuccessful. After the Wuchang Uprising and the formation of a Tongmenghui-led revolutionary government, Sun Yat-sen visited several great powers (including Japan, the United Kingdom, and the United States) in 1911 to negotiate for a loan to solve the ongoing financial crisis. His attempts were frustrated by the lack of international recognition of his government. In December 1911, while in a press conference in Shanghai, Sun announced the failure of the negotiations, stating, "The revolution was not started for the pursuit of wealth, but of passion. I returned to this country without a single penny, but I came back with the spirit of the revolutionaries."

=== Financial negotiations ===
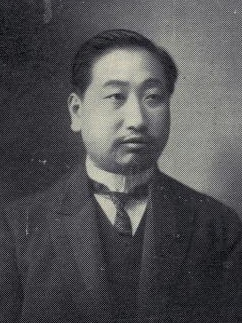
Xiong Xiling, Minister of Finance of the Republic of China (1912).

In February 1912, Puyi, the last emperor of China, abdicated from his position. It provided legitimacy for the newly established Beiyang government and allowed negotiations for the loan to resume. Once Yuan Shikai assumed the role of provisional President, he assigned Tang Shaoyi, his Premier and leader of the cabinet, to discuss financial loans with the China Consortium of foreign banks. Tang requested an emergency advance payment of 7 million taels (£85.2 million or US$110.8 million in 2021 value, inflation-adjusted) On 28 February, the consortium granted 2 million taels (£24.4 million or US$31.6 million in 2021 value, inflation-adjusted) for the government's use. On 2 March 1912, Yuan directed his Minister of Finance, Zhou Ziqi, to request an advance payment of 1 million taels (£12.2 million or US$15.8 million in 2021 value, inflation-adjusted).

Tang refined the details involved in the loan. He concluded that in order to repay national debts and fund government, military, social and infrastructural functions, the central government had to borrow a significant loan worth £60 million, equivalent to 600 million taels (£7.4 billion or US$9.7 billion in 2021 value, inflation-adjusted). It was projected that the loan was to be returned in five years. The Beiyang government planned to use revenues of its salt taxes as a guarantee, a term not accepted by the National Assembly. On 12 March, the banks involved in the consortium, responding to the £60 million loan, telegraphed their respective representatives at Peking, demanding that, "if the Beiyang government could not provide satisfactory terms to obtain the loan, then it should allow the banks of the consortium act as the primary granter for the loan if the provisional government was to sign the agreement". The banks also requested to monitor the uses of the loan. The representatives believed the terms were monopolistic and requested the banks to consult their respective governments for approval. The Beiyang government had tried to approach other banks for the loan in fear that the consortium might monopolize the country's financial system. On 14 March, Tang signed an agreement with a Belgian financial group for a loan of £10 million (£1.2 billion or US$1.6 billion in 2021 value, inflation-adjusted), but the loan was terminated after the ambassadors of Britain, France, Germany, and the United States protested at Peking. Yuan eventually approved the consortium's terms, cutting off any possible alternatives for the Beiyang government to borrow the loan.

On 2 May, the consortium added several new prerequisites; this included the Chinese government allowing the consortium to monitor the disarmament of military units of the Nanking government. Tang refused the conditions over violations of China's sovereignty, stalling the negotiations. He resigned in protest on 7 June, leaving the position on 27 June. Xiong Xiling, the Minister of Finance, resumed negotiations soon after. Xiong requested an advance payment of 19 million taels (£231.2 million or US$300.7 million in 2021 value, inflation-adjusted) to the consortium on 14 June. The consortium (now involving six countries, including Japan and Russia), responding to the urgency of the Beiyang government, granted the advance payment of £10 million (£1.3 billion or US$1.7 billion in 2021 value, inflation-adjusted) on 18 June, bound under seven-conditions:

1. The Chinese government must state the purposes of each payment;
2. The Chinese government must guarantee that its customs department or other similar government agencies control all tax revenues received;
3. The usage of the loan must be monitored by the consortium;
4. The advance payment of 19 million taels is determined as part of the reorganization loans, thus the consortium must be given the priority of its control;
5. The general principles of loaning shall be specified, and it shall be specified in general similar to the terms above;
6. The Chinese government must not borrow loans from other financial institutions before the funds of the reorganisation loan are distributed;
7. The 6 conditions above are considered mandatory, and the Chinese government must recognize the consortium as the government's agent for its finances for a period of five years.

The seven conditions were rejected by Xiong as he believed it was too harsh for the Beiyang government. On 24 June 1912, the consortium added new conditions to the agreement, demanding foreign control of the government-imposed salt tax. Xiong refused the consortium's demands once more. On 1 July, the Beiyang government, as a compromise, requested the consortium to reduce the loan from £60 million to only £10 million and asked for the relaxation of the conditions imposed in the loan agreement, but their request was rejected. Responding to the refusal, Xiong resigned in protest on 14 July, stalling negotiations again. In August, Yuan invited Sun Yat-sen to Peking (present-day Beijing) to discuss the issue. Regarding the loan crisis, Sun stated, "Currently, our nation's finances are in peril; we are forced to borrow foreign loans to resolve the present crisis, but we cannot borrow too much (from the consortium), or else it will promote extravagant spending in our government." On 30 August, Lew Yuk Lin, the Chinese Ambassador to the United Kingdom, signed an agreement for a loan of £10 million with the Birch Crisp & Company, a British financial institution, with plans to issue bonds for the loan at London. The agreement was opposed by both the British government and the banking consortium, forcing the cancellation of the bond's release.

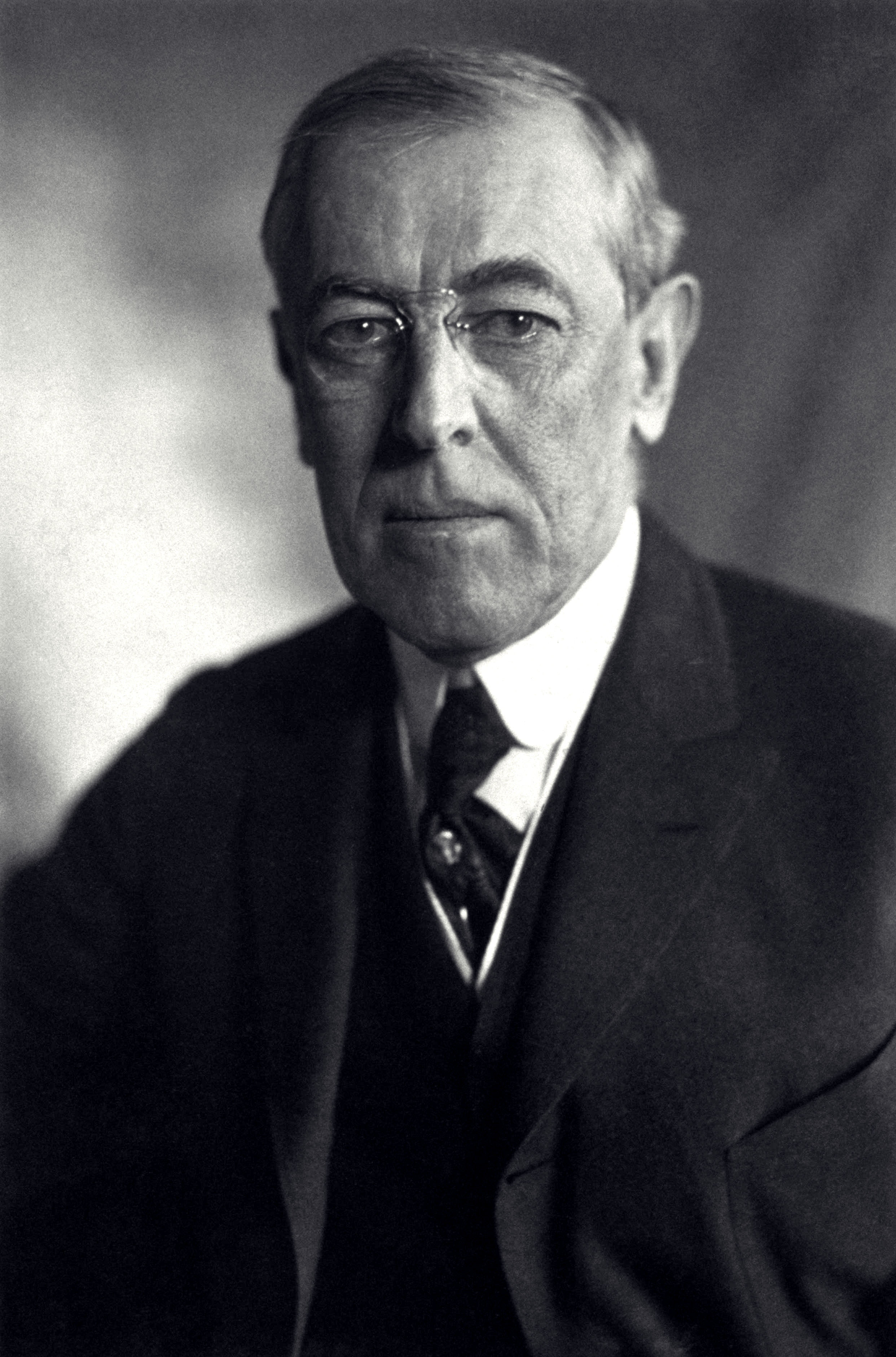
Woodrow Wilson's presidency reversed most of the United States' involvement in the banking consortium by 1913.

After Woodrow Wilson's inauguration as the President of the United States in March 1913, he reversed his predecessor's policy of dollar diplomacy. Wilson believed that the terms imposed by the consortium were a violation of Chinese sovereignty, against the principles of the Open Door Policy. On 20 March 1913, he withdrew the American government's support for the consortium, and promoted investors to invest independently in China. However, the general consensus of the Chinese American community were supportive of the United States' involvement in the consortium, as they were convinced that it could prevent Chinese sovereignty from being violated once more.

In February 1913, arguments over the consortium's notions to employ foreign personnel in Chinese financial institutions arose after negotiations between the consortium and the Beiyang government resumed. Amidst serious political crises after Song Jiaoren's assassination at Shanghai, Yuan Shikai approved the consortium's proposals in private with Sir John Jordan in April 1913. The Minister of Finance, Zhou Xuexi, notified the consortium's representatives at Peking that if the consortium was willing to lower the loan's interest rates from 5.5 percent to 5 percent, the government would bypass the National Assembly's authority and sign the agreement immediately. With the American withdrawal from the consortium, the consortium now feared that the United States might attempt to solely fund the loan to China, hence the terms of the agreement were relaxed.

Between the night of 26 April and early morning of 27 April 1913, Yuan Shikai, along with Premier Zhao Bingjun and other cabinet members, signed the Chinese Government Reorganisation Loan Agreement (Chinese: 中國政府善後借款合同) in the HSBC Building at the Beijing Legation Quarter, without the knowledge or approval of the National Assembly, formally loaning £25 million (51 billion marks, 63 billion francs, 24 billion rubles or 25 billion yen in 1913 currency exchange rates, £3.08 billion or US$4 billion in 2021 value, inflation-adjusted) from the consortium to the government. The agreement permitted the government to receive a payment of 84 percent of the loan's value, or £21 million (£2.6 billion or US$3.4 billion in 2021 value, inflation-adjusted), with an interest rate of 5 percent in a repayment period of 47 years. The government used the revenue of its salt taxes and tariffs as guarantees, while it was agreed that the Beiyang government was barred from borrowing new loans from other countries. With £6 million already paid as advance payments from the consortium, the government subsequently spent £5.7 million on debts, £3 million for military disarmament, £2.8 million for provincial governments, and £2 million to recuperate the losses suffered during the Xinhai revolution. The government could only receive less than 40 percent of the loan's actual value after all the expenses and payments were paid.

== Aftermath ==
When news of the signing was revealed, it shocked the country. When the National Assembly reconvened following the signing of the agreement, several amendments in the country's constitution were enacted in compliance with the agreement. It was immediately opposed by assembly representatives, as the agreement's conditions, notably the government's decision to use tax and tariff revenues as guarantees, were unacceptable as it was too harsh. Besides from the seven terms imposed by the agreement, local provincial governments were not allowed to make special loans for themselves. These circumstances provoked general opposition against the government's decision. The Speaker of the National Assembly, Zhang Ji, and his deputy, C.T. Wang, tried to approach Yuan Shikai over the issue, but Yuan refused to meet them. Members from the Kuomintang were convinced that Yuan was planning to use the loan to expand the Beiyang Army, and as the loan agreement was not approved by the National Assembly, it was to be declared as unconstitutional and illegal. In early-May 1913, three governors, Li Liejun (Governor of Jiangxi), Hu Hanmin (Governor of Canton), and Bo Wenwei (Governor of Anhui) telegraphed Yuan to voice out their opposition against the reorganisation loan.

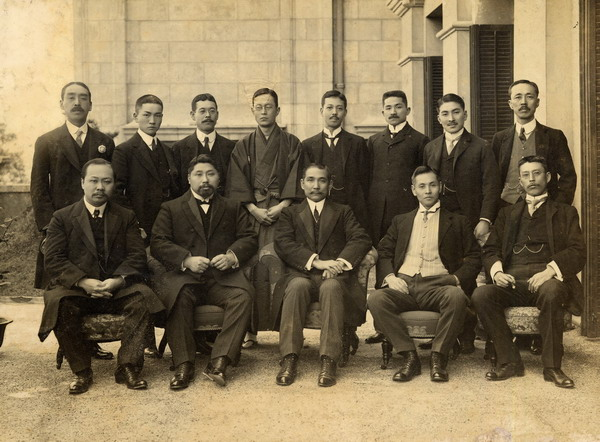
In March 1913, Sun Yat-sen, Huang Xing and other pro-Kuomintang revolutionaries met at Shanghai to discuss plans for a second uprising against Yuan Shikai's regime.

Li Yuanhong, the vice President, sought to resolve the conflicts between the Kuomintang and the central government. On June, all three governors that had previously opposed the loan (Li, Hu and Bo) were dismissed from their positions by the central government. Yuan then accused "anti-party traitors" of attempting to revolt at Hukou, and sent the Beiyang Army's 6th Division (under the command of Li Chun) to occupy Jiangxi. The 24th Regiment, under the leadership of Zhang Jingyao, entered Jiujiang on 5 July 1913 and was involved in a skirmish with local militias. Sun Yat-sen, believing that a civil war was imminent, launched the Second Revolution. On 8 July, Li Liejun, under direct orders of Sun, reached Hukou and declared war against the Beiyang Army, citing, "Yuan Shikai exploited the weaknesses of the Republic, and tried to form a new imperial order, with no regards of humility and morality; he assassinated opposing leaders, disregarding any law or constitution, and borrowed large loans without consent......(he) decided to send an army in the peak of summer, to repress Jiangxi, (and) to use his army to terrorize this land." On 18 July, Chen Jiongming announced Canton was in revolt. After the failure of the Second Revolution in 1914, the reorganisation loans were ultimately accepted, albeit reluctantly, in the National Assembly.

Between 1914 and 1918, the Bank of Japan provided several loans for the Beiyang government for industrial uses. The government used natural resources as a guarantee for the loans. Reparations for the loan did not stop until the outbreak of the Second Sino-Japanese War when the Nationalist government was forced to abandon reparations in 1939. In 2002, the Foreign Bondholders Protective Council (FBPC) demanded the Chinese government to resume reparations, but the FBPC's request was denied. A lawsuit was filed involving the issue, but in March 2007, it was withdrawn after the United States District Court for the Southern District of New York ruled that the Chinese government had no obligations to resume reparations.

== Evaluation ==
The Beiyang government was already at the brink of bankruptcy prior to the signing of the loan. As the government was unable to develop the economy, they were forced to approach foreign loans. Among the few duties carried out by Sun Yat-sen when he was president, it included making foreign trips to request loans from major banks.

Despite the shortcomings of the government's financial status, Yuan Shikai's decision to approve the reorganisation loans generated controversy, mainly due to the government's policy of ceding the control of its taxes and tariffs to the China Consortium. The government only received less than 40 percent of the actual value agreed in the loan, while having to pay £42.85 million (£5.2 billion or US$6.8 billion in 2021 value, inflation-adjusted) in interests, totaling the debt generated to £67.85 million (£8.3 billion or US$10.8 billion in 2021 value, inflation-adjusted). The government was also required to form a Salt Bureau, under the leadership of the Minister of Finance, with partial control given to members of the Chinese government and the consortium's representatives. Provincial treasuries of Zhili (present-day Hebei), Shandong, Henan and Jiangsu were also bounded as guarantors for the agreement; their status could be removed only if the government could generate enough revenue from its salt taxes. This provided a platform for foreign interference on China's financial independence.

According to Sir John Jordan's report submitted for the British government, Yuan used the reorganisation loans to repress the Kuomintang's military influence. After the failure of the Second Revolution, a report drafted by Edward T. Williams, then United States' Ambassador to China (1911–1913), stated that, "...barring from the funds yet to be provided for the (Chinese) government, and the £4.4 million (£535.5 million or US$696.3 million in 2021 value, inflation-adjusted) prepared for taxation and bureaucratic reforms, most of the money involved in the loan have already been spent......moreover the (Chinese) government is suffering a financial deficit of US$2 million (US$57.3 million in 2021 value, inflation-adjusted)."
