= China Development Finance Corporation =

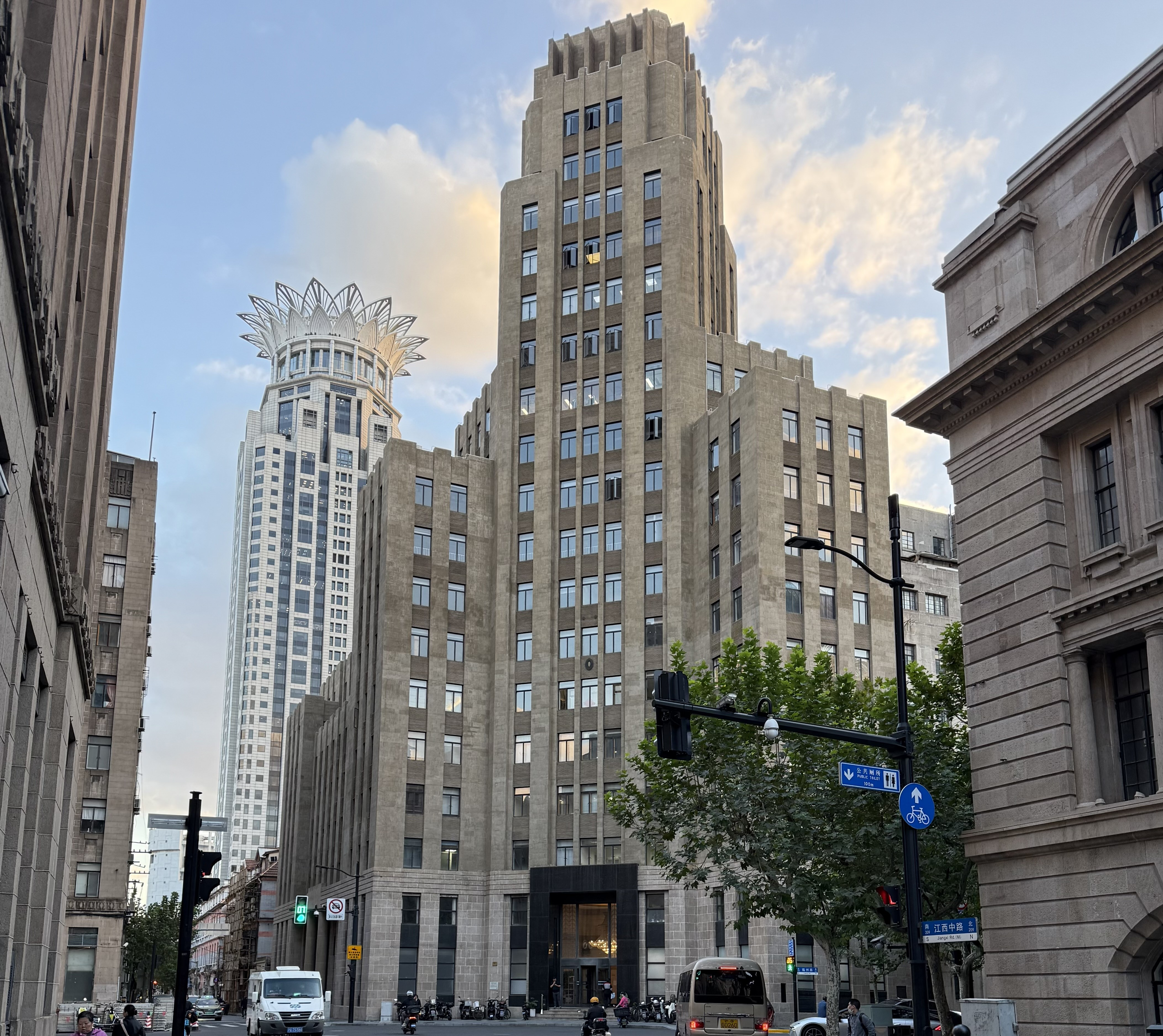
The Development Building (architects Davies, Brooke & Gran), built in 1935, was the headquarters of the CDFC in Shanghai

The China Development Finance Corporation (CDFC, Chinese: 中國建設銀公司) was an investment company formed in 1934 to facilitate investment in the Republic of China, specifically into infrastructure development and in particular railways. Its main sponsor was Chinese financier and statesman T. V. Soong, acting on ideas formulated by then international financier Jean Monnet during Soong's trip to the United States in May 1933 and Monnet's own stay in China from November 1933.

The CDFC quickly became a major access channel for foreign financing of investment in China. From its inception, however, it was undermined by Japanese hostility, and from 1937 by the Second Sino-Japanese War, followed by the Chinese Civil War and eventually by expropriation from mainland China in 1949. The CDFC was also limited by its identification with the interests of the family and clientele group around Soong.

== Formation ==
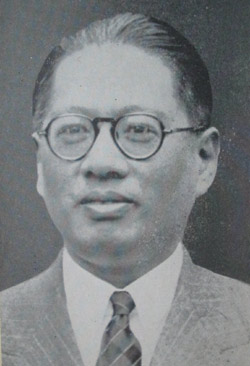
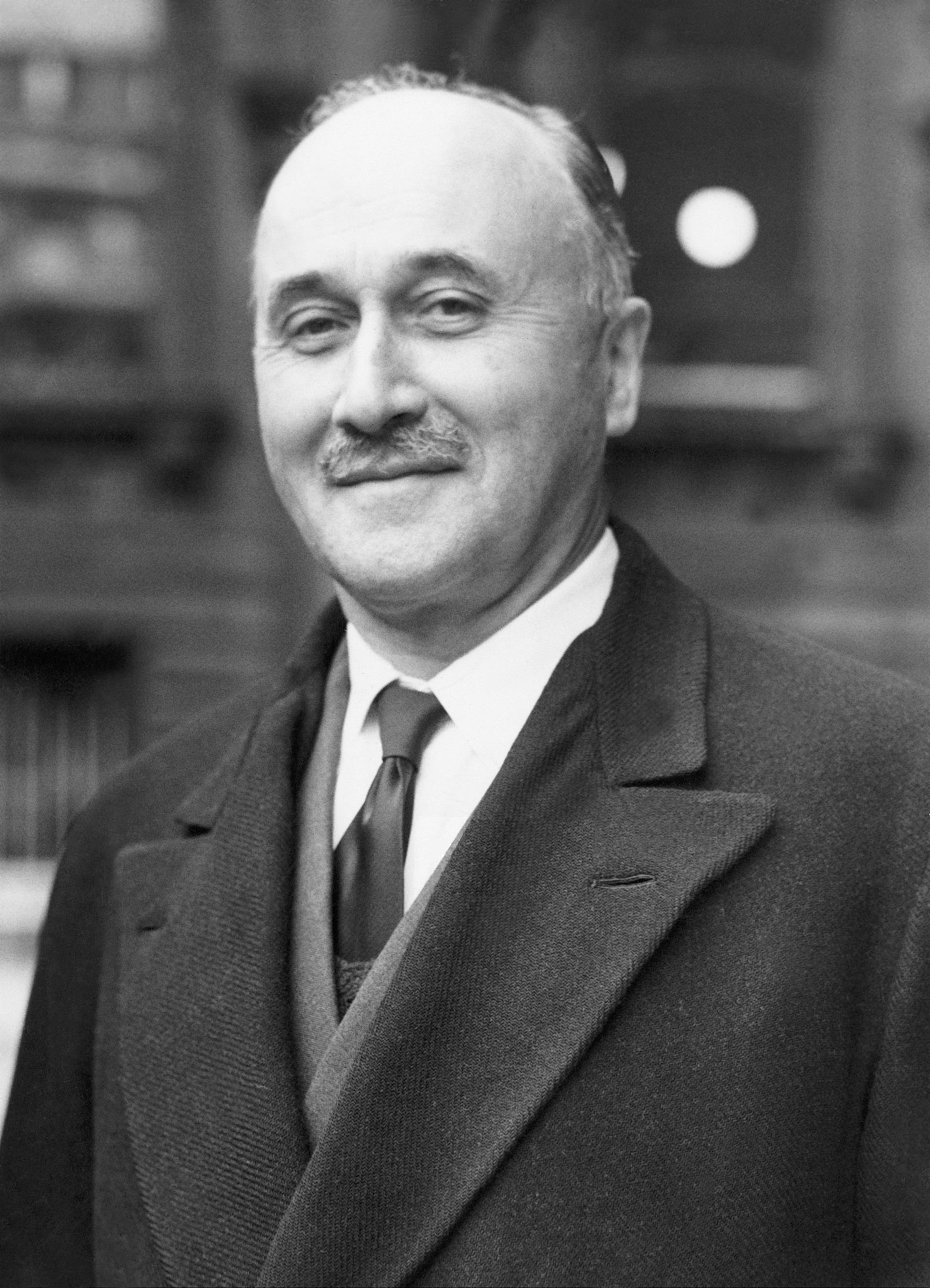
T. V. Soong and Jean Monnet, key figures in the creation of the CDFC

The first idea of the CDFC emerged from discussions in May 1933 in the United States between T. V. Soong and Jean Monnet, whom Soong had first approached to advise the Chinese government in late 1932 following a recommendation by their common acquaintance Ludwik Rajchman. In October 1933, Soong resigned as finance minister following disagreements with Chiang Kai-shek about attitudes towards Japan, to which Soong was more hostile than Chiang. Monnet arrived in Shanghai on 21 November 1933 from San Francisco and, in early 1934, came to the conclusion that, unlike in his initial blueprint, the CDFC should be formed with equity capital from China only. The reason was that opening the capital to foreign investors would entail either including or excluding Japan, both options being problematic.

The CDFC was formed on that basis in the spring, with a capital of C$10 million, and held its first board meeting on 2 June 1934. It elected T. V. Soong's brother-in-law H. H. Kung as chairman, Soong himself and Tsuyee Pei (father of I. M. Pei) as executive directors, and Soong's brother T. L. Soong as general manager. Other prominent backers included banker Li Ming and intellectual luminary Li Shizeng. Most of its equity capital was held by domestic Chinese banks, including the "big four": Farmers Bank of China, Bank of Communications, Central Bank of China, and Bank of China notwithstanding its general manager Chang Kia-ngau's misgivings.

The Japanese government's initial reaction was hostile, despite Monnet's efforts to keep them continuously informed of the project's development, though that did not prevent the CDFC from starting its activity in 1934. On 3 July 1934, the CDFC hired Monnet as its exclusive representative in Europe and the United States for a renewable three-year term, against which Monnet would receive 7.5 percent of the CDFC's profits or rights to profits from syndicating business.

== Activity ==
The CDFC leveraged the Soong family connections to access capital in China, including from the Bank of China whose board T. V. Soong chaired from 1935 to 1943. It assembled financing for the completion of the railway from Shanghai to Hangzhou and Ningbo, in partnership with the British and Chinese Corporation. For that project, it completed the Qiantang River Bridge in 1937, but had to sabotage it only a few weeks later, to deny its use to the invading Japanese Army. Its attempts to complete the Chengyu line from Chongqing to Chengdu, operated by the Chuan Chien Railway company, were similarly thwarted by the war situation, with only a section completed by April 1938, and eventually by the outbreak of World War II in Europe.

The CDFC soon built up multiple businesses and became a conglomerate with activities in coal mining, electricity generation, but also department stores (through shareholding in Wing On), cotton, lumber, and stamp tax collection for the Chinese government. Despite disruption from Japanese occupation of much of China's territory, it kept operating during the war years. After 1945 it was able to repossess its former assets in the areas liberated from Japanese occupation, but many of these had been damaged and investment was made more difficult by the context of hyperinflation and civil war. By that time, T. V. Soong's influence and connections had declined, and he was the subject of political attacks including from inside the Kuomintang. Eventually, the People's Republic of China seized all mainland CDFC properties in 1949 as "bureaucratic capitalist enterprises".

Meanwhile, Monnet had left China in July 1934, and on 18 February 1935 co-founded in New York the investment bank Monnet, Murnane & Co. which soon had offices in Hong Kong, London, New York City, Paris and Shanghai, and took over Monnet's role as CDFC fundraiser in the western world. Monnet made a second trip to China, from April 1935 to January 1936. On 16 December 1936, he brokered an agreement between the CDFC and the Franco-Chinese Bank, which in turn gathered support in 1937 from the Banque de Paris et des Pays-Bas, the Banque de l'Indochine and the Banque Lazard Frères to support the CDFC's investment projects. Monnet built up a similar financing platform for the CDFC in Belgium. His business relationship with the CDFC, however, deteriorated in the late 1930s, despite T. V. Soong's continued personal commitment to the partnership. On 2 February 1940, Monnet resigned from his position of chairman of Monnet, Murnane & Co., as he was by then focused on the European war situation.

== Assessment ==
Beyond its significant business activity, the CDFC has been deemed of historical interest as an early example of a Chinese public-private business organization, prefiguring in certain ways some of the politically connected family-controlled conglomerates of early 21st-century China.

In his memoirs written in the 1970s, Monnet reflected about the CDFC experience that "[t]he Soong family and their associates were among the main shareholders in the China [Development Finance] Corporation. The idea of public service was not yet wholly free from dynastic traditions, and the long march towards democracy had hardly begun."

== See also ==
- China Consortium
- China Development Bank
