= China Consortium =

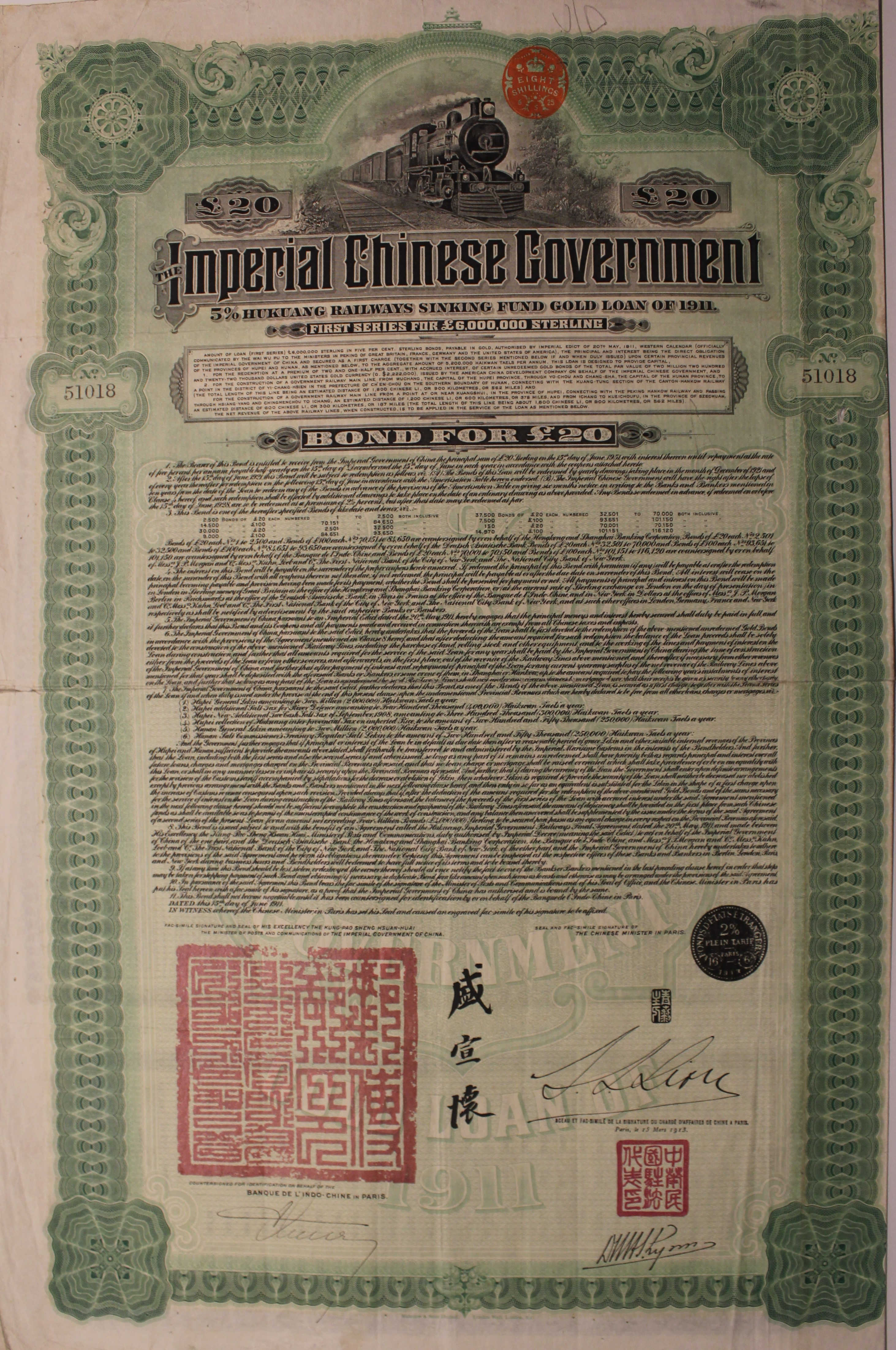
Hukuang railway bond, June 1911

The China Consortium, also referred to as banking consortium or financial consortium or four-, five-, or six-power consortium depending on context, refers to two successive cooperative arrangements formed by foreign banks under their respective governments' directions in the early 20th century, to coordinate lending to the Chinese government. These initiatives were resented by Chinese nationalists and later similarly criticized by Chinese Communists, as instruments of colonialism wielded by Western nations and Japan.

== First China Consortium ==
=== Background ===
The emergence of the "old" China Consortium in 1909–1910 happened in the context of Qing dynasty China's need for external financing, because of its need to pay war damages under the Treaty of Shimonoseki of 1895 (200 million taels) and Boxer Protocol of 1901 (450 million taels), and with the scramble for railway concessions in the late 19th and early 20th centuries. The context was further framed by the British-French Entente Cordiale, concluded in April 1904, and by the Japanese victory in the Russo-Japanese War of 1904–1905, which stimulated nationalist sentiment in China.

The Consortium's origins can be traced to a joint British-French initiative in 1904 for joint funding of railway lines in the central area of China. By then, Hankou (now part of Wuhan, near the center of China proper) was being linked to the northern capital of Beijing with funding by Belgian and French investors. In order to further link Hankou with Guangdong in the south and Sichuan in the west, the British and Chinese Corporation (a joint venture of HSBC and Jardine Matheson), the Pekin Syndicate (a British firm with many French investors), and a French grouping that included the Banque de l'Indochine created a joint investment vehicle, called Chinese Central Railways Ltd. The British-French arrangement of 1904 was explicitly open to future American and also Belgian participation, even though no American participant firmly committed at the time.

In subsequent years, Chinese official Zhang Zhidong played Western powers against each other to secure better borrowing conditions, and offered the opportunity to finance the central Chinese railway network, by then known as the Hukuang Railway (with reference to an ancient name for much of the area between the Yangtze and the Southern Chinese coastline), to German financiers instead. Zhang's move in turn prompted the British and French bankers to adopt a more inclusive approach vis-à-vis their German peers.

=== Establishment of the consortium ===
In the spring of 1909, an agreement crystallized between the British, French and German bankers, who decided to go ahead despite reminders from American counterparts about the pledge back in 1904 to include them in the deal. A formal agreement to form the three-nation banking consortium was finalized in Beijing on 6 June 1909 by HSBC, the Deutsch-Asiatische Bank and Banque de l'Indochine, for a loan of £5.5 million subject to Chinese government approval.

The British government, however, soon again adopted the American view that the 1904 arrangements were binding, and thus advocated inclusion of American partners. By then, the U.S. administration led by president William Howard Taft had formulated a new understanding of the prior Open Door Policy, with more emphasis on commercial investment and thus dubbed the "Dollar diplomacy". This reversal opened a new sequence of protracted negotiations to include American bankers led by J.P. Morgan & Co. Eventually, an agreement was found at a meeting in Paris at the Banque de l'Indochine head office, on 23 May 1910. The contracting parties were, for the UK, the British and Chinese Corporation and Chinese Central Railways Ltd, with Carl Meyer, C. S. Addis, and G. Jameson as signatories; for Germany, the Deutsch-Asiatische Bank, with Franz Urbig and Emil Rehders; for France, the Banque de l'Indochine, with politician Joseph Caillaux, Stanislas Simon and Maurice Casenave (Banque de l'Indochine), and Émile Ullmann (Comptoir National d'Escompte de Paris); and for the U.S., Morgan's UK affiliate Morgan, Grenfell & Co., with Edward Grenfell, Henry P. Davison, Max Warburg, Henry H. Harjes, and Willard D. Straight as signatories.

=== Hukuang Railway loan and 1911 Revolution ===
The consortium bankers then started discussing the lending terms with the Chinese authorities, which were hesitant to accept the demanding conditions, a valid concern as subsequent events would demonstrate. Finally, on 20 May 1911, the four-nation Consortium granted a loan of £6 million to finance the Hukuang Railway, by then defined as the tracks from the northern border of Guangdong to Hankou and from there to the eastern border of Sichuan. In April 1911, the Consortium had separately granted a loan of £10 million for Chinese currency reform, establishing its relevance beyond its original scope of financing railway investment.

Just as Chinese officials had feared, the conditions placed on China ignited protests that became the Railway Protection Movement, and contributed to triggering the 1911 Revolution and the demise of the Qing Empire in early 1912. The Consortium opted for a stance of neutrality during the revolutionary turmoil, and rejected desperate requests of the Manchu regime for emergency funding during that period. The young republican regime's de facto strongman, Yuan Shikai, was unsuccessful in his efforts in January 1912 to raise domestic funding for the Beiyang Government, and thus had to seek further loans from the foreign powers. As soon as 28 February 1912, the Hongkong and Shanghai Bank made an advance of two million taels to Yuan on behalf of the Consortium. Tang Shaoyi, Republican China's first Prime Minister, aimed at a £60 million loan from the Consortium to support the fledgling new regime. The Consortium, however, soon found out that Tang was separately seeking funding from a competing Belgian-British syndicate, and suspended its advances to the government in response; Tang had to officially cancel the Belgian-British deal on 2 May 1912, which further entrenched the Consortium's position. John Jordan, a British diplomat who had initially been skeptical of the entire consortium approach, established a strict scheme to control Chinese expenditure as part of the loan negotiations, to be overseen by the foreign commissioners of the Chinese Maritime Customs Service.

=== Consortium expansion to Japan and Russia ===
Japan and Russia subsequently asked to join the consortium which was thus enlarged and became known as the "six-power consortium", by agreement of 18 June 1912, scheduled to expire five years later in June 1917. The consortium was thus composed of six national groups:

- a British group led by the Hongkong and Shanghai Bank, joined by late 1912 by Barings Bank, London County and Westminster Bank, Parr's Bank, and Schroders;
- a German group led by the Deutsch-Asiatische Bank and including 14 other institutions, among which the Deutsche Bank and Dresdner Bank:
- a French group led by the Banque de l'Indochine and including the Comptoir National d’Escompte de Paris, Crédit Industriel et Commercial, Banque de Paris et des Pays-Bas, Société Générale, Banque Française pour le Commerce et l'Industrie, Banque de l'Union Parisienne, and Crédit Lyonnais;
- an American group led by J.P. Morgan & Co. and also including Kuhn, Loeb & Co., the International Banking Corporation (a vehicle set up by National City Bank of New York for its international investments), and First National Bank of New York;
- a Russian-led group with the Russo-Asiatic Bank but also non-Russian participants such as the Société Générale de Belgique;
- a Japanese group consisting solely of the Yokohama Specie Bank.

=== Competing lending arrangements and U.S. withdrawal ===
Meanwhile, the unpopularity of the consortium led the Republican government to explore alternative financing options. It agreed later in 1912 to sponsor the Banque Industrielle de Chine, and sought funding from a British syndicate assembled by financier Birch Crisp, and separately from Belgian and French investors (including the Société Générale de Belgique, the Empain group, the Banque Sino-Belge and their French partners) for a railway line in western China.

This was not enough, however, to meet China's financing needs and did not deprive the Consortium of its relevance. By the end of 1912, an agreement of principle was reached between the Beiyang Government and the Consortium for a $25 million loan backed by revenue from the Chinese salt tax. The finalization of the loan, however, was further delayed by disputes among the foreign powers about the loan's governance arrangements.

In early 1913, the U.S. administration led by newly elected President Woodrow Wilson aimed at a new formulation of the Open Door Policy that would abandon Taft's dollar diplomacy. On 19 March 1913, it decided to terminate American participation in the consortium, which was therefore reduced to five participating powers and banks. The American withdrawal was popular in China, just as the Consortium and the loan were controversial.

=== Reorganization Loan of 1913 ===
Two days after the U.S. withdrawal, the assassination of Song Jiaoren triggered a dramatic escalation of political tension in Beijing, and led Yuan Shikai to reduce his demands in the negotiation with the now five-power consortium in order to have rapid access to fresh funds. Yuan persuaded the bankers to skip ratification of the loan by the National Assembly.

The loan agreement was promptly signed at the HSBC building in the Beijing Legation Quarter on 26 April 1913, a day after Sun Yat-sen had denounced it in a public speech in Shanghai. The loan, of £25 million including repayment of the departed American bankers, became known as the Reorganization Loan, or in Chinese historiography, the Grand Loan of the Second Year of the Republic of China. It was widely criticized for giving Yuan Shikai the means to defeat the opposition to his rule that is often referred to as China's Second Revolution.

The reorganization loan capped a 13-year period of broad unity of action of the foreign powers in China, opened by the Eight-Nation Alliance in response to the Boxer Rebellion in 1900, and ended soon afterwards by the July 1914 Crisis and subsequent world war.

=== World War I ===
During World War I, the China Consortium was hobbled by the fact that Germany was at war with the other members, and the other European belligerents also faced increasing financial distress. Japan stepped up its bilateral lending to China, which provided the bulk of the country's external financing during that period. In the U.S., the Wilson administration gradually changed its stance as it sought to defend the fledgling Chinese republic against increasingly aggressive Japanese encroachments, including the Twenty-One Demands formulated by the Imperial Japanese government in early 1915. But throughout his first term, Wilson's preference was to only encourage private lending by U.S. banks in China without any government guarantee, and that did not happen given the high risks involved and the more attractive opportunities for American banks to lend elsewhere, particularly in wartime Europe.

Conditions changed in late 1916 after Wilson's reelection and the arrival in October of a new Japanese government led by Seiki Terauchi, which adopted a policy of "no coercion in China". On 30 January 1917, representatives of the Consortium's non-German members, namely France, Japan, Russia and the UK, met in London and petitioned their American peers to consider participation in a supplementary issue of the Reorganization Loan. The State Department, however, was reluctant to endorse the plan. That effectively put an end to the First Consortium's activity, whose agreement in the five-power format had expired anyway in June 1917. In August 1917, the Yokohama Specie Bank provided a bilateral loan of 10 million yen to the Chinese government, which it called the Second Reorganization Loan.

== Second China Consortium ==
=== Formation ===
By late November 1917, Wilson was persuaded that a new consortium should be organized with France and the UK despite their financial weakness, Japan, and an expanded group of American banks. (Russia had left the Chinese scene following the October Revolution.) Throughout the first months of 1918, however, the U.S. delayed decision, leaving the Japanese to lend not only to the government in Beijing but also to other Chinese warring factions. Eventually, on 21 June 1918, Wilson approved a proposal by Secretary of State Robert Lansing to start negotiations on a new consortium. The United States Department of State aimed both at limiting if not eliminating foreign spheres of influence in China, and at securing equal access to the Chinese market for American capital. The U.S. subsequently invited France, Japan and the UK to negotiate a new agreement, and the four countries' delegates eventually adopted a draft agreement on 12 May 1919 as they were meeting for the Paris Peace Conference. The Japanese government accepted the draft agreement on 1 September 1919, but with a reservation with regard to the Liaodong Peninsula (then referred to as South Manchuria) and Mongolia. Compromise language was subsequently agreed to that effect between British and Japanese diplomats, ignoring Chinese objections.

The agreement on the new consortium was eventually finalized by negotiators from the four countries and signed on 15 October 1920 by representatives of the Hongkong and Shanghai Banking Corporation, the Banque de l'Indochine, Yokohama Specie Bank, and the participating American banks: J.P. Morgan & Co., Kuhn, Loeb & Co., National City Bank of New York, Guaranty Trust Company of New York, Continental and Commercial Trust and Savings Bank of Chicago, Chase National Bank, and Lee, Higginson & Co. It was notified to the Chinese government in Beijing on 18 January 1921. Belgium joined the consortium soon afterwards.

=== Operation ===
The new consortium was unable to make loans, because of the political turmoil within China and of the divergent interests of its member countries. It kept existing formally until 1939, however, with regular meetings of bankers forming its council until 1925. By March 1922, its British members included HSBC, Barings Bank, London County and Westminster Bank, Schroders, Chartered Bank of India, Australia and China, N.M. Rothschild & Sons, and British Trade Corporation.

In 1934, Japanese ambassador to China Yakichiro Suma referred to the consortium agreement of October 1920 to object to the creation of the China Development Finance Corporation, but his argument was rejected by the American authorities.

== See also ==
- Boxer Protocol
- American China Development Company
- China Development Finance Corporation
- Paris Club
