= Twenty-One Demands =

1915 Japanese set of demands to China

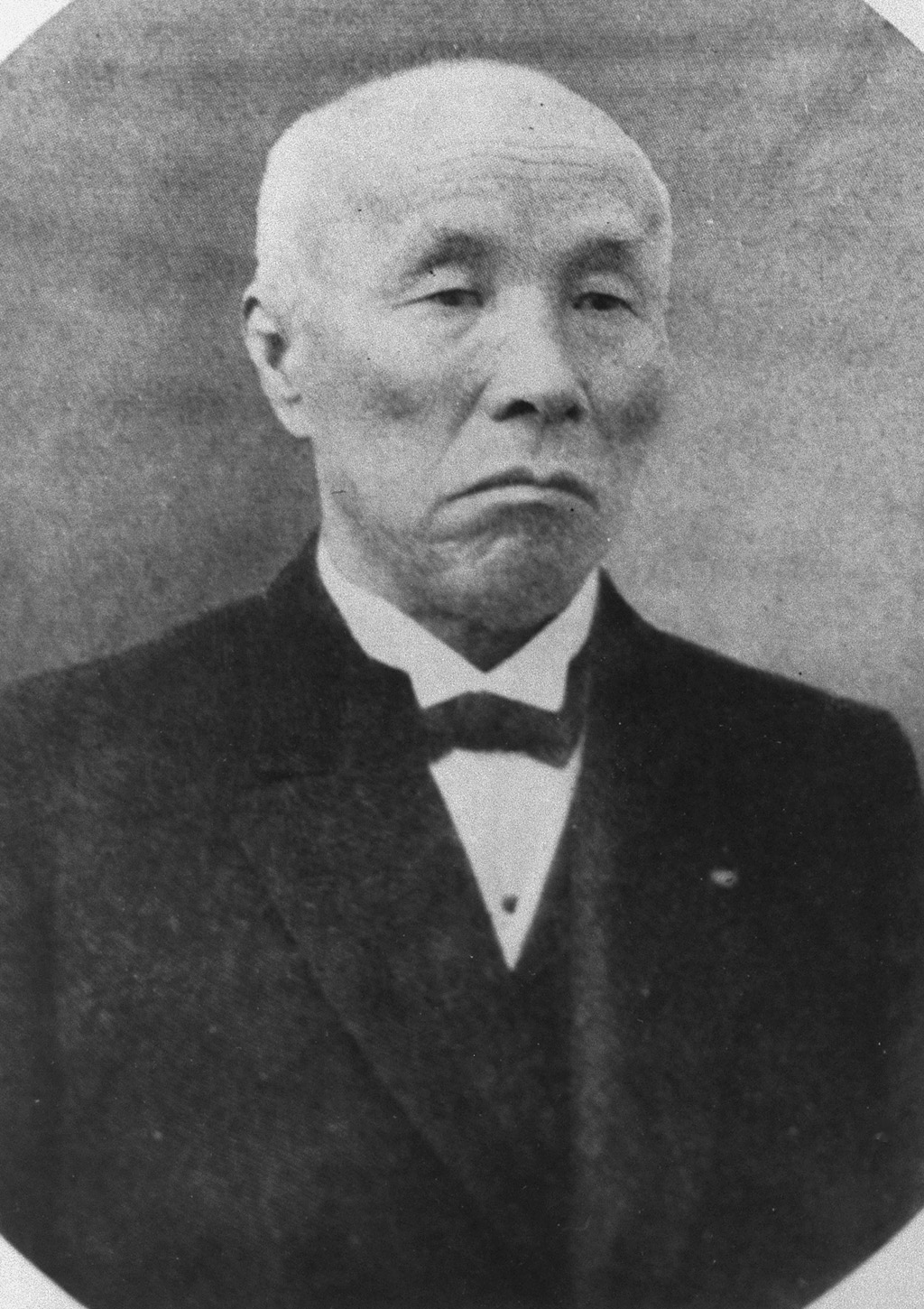
Japanese Prime Minister Ōkuma Shigenobu, under whose administration the Twenty-One Demands were drafted

The Twenty-One Demands was a set of demands made during the First World War by the Empire of Japan under Prime Minister Ōkuma Shigenobu to the government of the Republic of China on 18 January 1915. The secret demands would greatly extend Japanese control of China. Japan would keep the former German leased territory it had conquered at the start of World War I in 1914 and would have increased influence in Manchuria and Inner Mongolia while having an expanded role in railways. The most extreme demands (in section 5) would give Japan a decisive voice in finance, policing, and government affairs: the latter would make China in effect a protectorate of Japan, and thereby reduce Western influence.

Japan was in a strong position during the course of the war as the Allies were in a stalemate with the opposing Central Powers. The United Kingdom and Japan had been in a military alliance since 1902, and in 1914, the UK had asked Japan to enter the war. China published the secret demands, upsetting the Americans and British. They were sympathetic to Chinese protests and forced Japan to drop section 5 in the final 1915 settlement. Japan gained little in China and lost a great deal of prestige and trust with both the United Kingdom and the United States.

The Chinese public responded with a spontaneous nationwide boycott of Japanese goods and Japan's exports to China fell drastically. The UK was affronted and no longer trusted Japan as an ally. With the First World War underway, Japan's position was strong and the UK's was weak; nevertheless, the UK and the US forced Japan to drop the fifth set of demands that would have given Japan a large measure of control over the entire Chinese economy and ended the Open Door Policy. Japan and China reached a series of agreements which ratified the first four sets of goals on 25 May 1915.

== Background ==
Japan had gained a large sphere of influence in northern China and Manchuria through its victories in the First Sino-Japanese War and the Russo-Japanese War, and had thus joined the ranks of the European imperialist powers in their scramble to establish political and economic domination over Imperial China under the Qing dynasty. With the overthrow of the Qing dynasty in the Xinhai Revolution, and the subsequent establishment of the new Republic of China, Japan saw an opportunity to further expand its position in China.

The German Empire was in control of Shandong province as part of the Kiautschou Bay concession since 1898. With the onset of the First World War, Japan declared war against Germany on 23 August 1914. Japanese and British forces quickly seized all German holdings in the Far East, after the Siege of Tsingtao.

== Initial negotiations ==
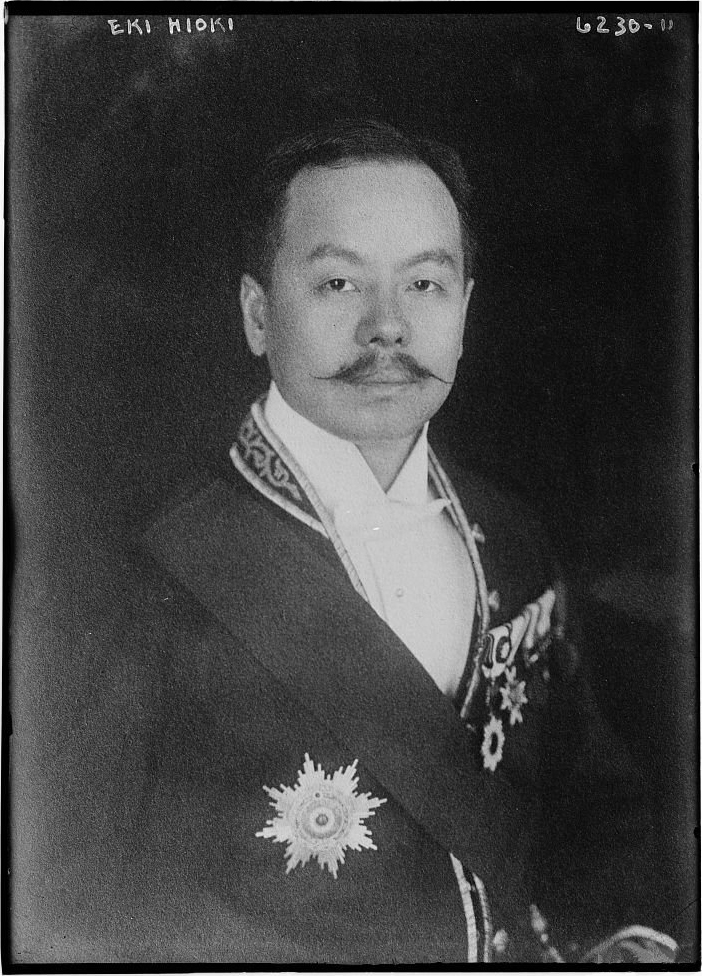
Eki Hioki (日置益)

Japan, under Prime Minister Ōkuma Shigenobu and Foreign Minister Katō Takaaki, drafted the initial list of Twenty-One Demands, which were reviewed by the genrō and Emperor Taishō, and approved by the Diet. Ambassador Hioki Eki delivered the list to President Yuan Shikai of the Beiyang government in a private audience on 18 January 1915, with warnings of dire consequences if China were to reject them.

The Twenty-One Demands were divided into five groups:

- Group 1 (four demands) confirmed Japan's recent seizure of German ports and operations in Shandong Province, and expanded Japan's sphere of influence over the railways, coasts and major cities of the province.
- Group 2 (seven demands) pertained to Japan's South Manchuria Railway Zone, extending the leasehold over the territory for 99 years, and expanding Japan's sphere of influence in southern Manchuria and eastern Inner Mongolia, to include rights of settlement and extraterritoriality, appointment of financial and administrative officials to the government and priority for Japanese investments in those areas. Japan demanded access to Inner Mongolia for raw materials, as a manufacturing site, and as a strategic buffer against Russian encroachment in Korea.
- Group 3 (two demands) gave Japan control of the Han-Ye-Ping (Hanyang, Daye, and Pingxiang) mining and metallurgical complex in central China; it was deep in debt to Japan.
- Group 4 (one demand) barred China from giving any further coastal or island concessions to foreign powers.
- Group 5 (seven demands) was the most aggressive. China was to hire Japanese advisors who could take effective control of China's finance and police. Japan would be empowered to build three major railways, and also Buddhist temples and schools. Japan would gain effective control of Fujian, across the Taiwan Strait from Taiwan, which had been ceded to Japan in 1895.

Knowing the negative reaction "Group 5" would cause, Japan initially tried to keep its contents secret. The Chinese government attempted to stall for as long as possible and leaked the full contents of the Twenty-One Demands to European powers in the hope that due to a perceived threat to their own political and economic spheres of interest, they would help contain Japan.

== Japanese ultimatum ==
After China rejected Japan's revised proposal on 26 April 1915, the genrō intervened and deleted 'Group 5' from the document, as these had proved to be the most objectionable to the Chinese government. A reduced set of "Thirteen Demands" was transmitted on May 7 in the form of an ultimatum, with a two-day deadline for response. Yuan Shikai was not in a position to risk war with Japan, and accepted appeasement, a tactic followed by his successors. The final form of the treaty was signed by both parties on May 25, 1915.

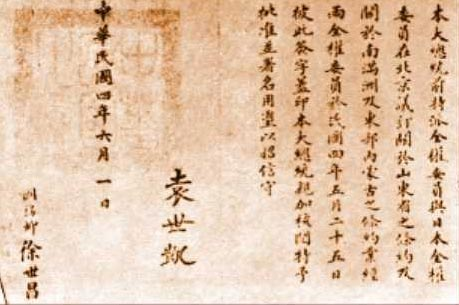
"The Chinese's Acceptance of the Twenty-One Demands" signed by Yuan Shikai

Katō Takaaki publicly admitted that the ultimatum was invited by Yuan to save face with the Chinese people in conceding to the Demands. American Minister Paul Reinsch reported to the US State Department that the Chinese officials were surprised at the leniency of the ultimatum, as it demanded much less than they had already committed themselves to concede.

== Consequences ==
The results of the revised final (Thirteen Demands) version of the Twenty-One Demands were far more negative for Japan than positive. Without "Group 5", the new treaty gave Japan little more than it already had in China.

On the other hand, the United States expressed strongly negative reactions to Japan's rejection of the Open Door Policy. In the Bryan Note issued by Secretary of State William Jennings Bryan on 13 March 1915, the U.S., while affirming Japan's "special interests" in Manchuria, Mongolia and Shandong, expressed concern over further encroachments to Chinese sovereignty.

Great Britain, Japan's closest ally, expressed concern over what was perceived as Japan's overbearing, bullying approach to diplomacy, and the British Foreign Office in particular was unhappy with Japanese attempts to establish what would effectively be a Japanese protectorate over all of China.

Afterwards, Japan and the United States looked for a compromise; as a result, the Lansing–Ishii Agreement was concluded in 1917. It was approved by the Paris Peace Conference in 1919.

Japan continued to push for outright control over Shandong Province and won European diplomatic recognition for their claim at the Treaty of Versailles (despite the refusal of the Chinese delegation to sign the treaty). This, in turn, provoked ill-will from the United States government, as well as widespread hostility within China; a large-scale boycott against Japanese goods was just one effect. In 1922, the U.S. brokered a solution: China was awarded nominal sovereignty over all of Shandong, while in practice Japan's economic dominance continued.

In China, the overall political impact of Japan's actions was highly negative, creating a considerable amount of public ill-will towards Japan, contributing to the May Fourth Movement, and a significant upsurge in nationalism.

== See also ==
- China–Japan relations
- History of the Republic of China
- Warlord Era
- Unequal treaties
- Japanese imperialism

== Bibliography ==
- Akagi, Roy Hidemichi. Japan Foreign Relations 1542–1936 (1936) pp 332–364.online
- Bix, Herbert P. "Japanese Imperialism and the Manchurian Economy, 1900–31." China Quarterly (1972): 425–443 online
- Clubb, O. Edmund. 20th century China (1965) online pp 52–55, 86
- Davis, Clarence B. "Limits of Effacement: Britain and the Problem of American Cooperation and Competition in China, 1915–1917." Pacific Historical Review (1979): 47–63.
- Dickinson, Frederick R. War and national reinvention: Japan in the Great War, 1914–1919 (Harvard U. Asia Center, Vol. 177. 1999)
- Dull, Paul S. “Count Kato Komei and the Twenty-One Demands.” Pacific Historical Review 19#2 (1950), pp. 151–161. online
- Duus, Peter et al. eds. The Japanese informal empire in China, 1895–1937 (1989) online
- Gowen, Robert Joseph. "Great Britain and the Twenty-One Demands of 1915: Cooperation versus Effacement," Journal of Modern History (1971) 43#1 pp. 76–106 in JSTOR
- Griswold, A. Whitney. The Far Eastern Policy of the United States (1938)
- Hsü, Immanuel C. Y. (1970). The Rise of Modern China. Oxford UP. pp. 494, 502.
- Hinsley, F. H. ed. British Foreign Policy under Sir Edward Grey (1977) pp 452–465.
- Jansen, Marius B. "Yawata, Hanyehping, and the twenty-one demands," Pacific Historical Review (1954) 23#1 pp 31–48.
- LaFeber, Walter. The Clash: US-Japanese Relations Throughout History (1998) pp 106–16.
- Link, Arthur S. Wilson, Volume III: The Struggle for Neutrality, 1914–1915 (1960) pp 267–308, on the American role.
- Luo, Zhitian. "National humiliation and national assertion – The Chinese response to the twenty-one demands" Modern Asian Studies (1993) 27#2 pp 297–319 online.
- Narangoa, Li. "Japanese Geopolitics and the Mongol Lands, 1915–1945," European Journal of East Asian Studies (2004) 3#1 pp 45–67
- Nish, Ian Hill. Japanese foreign policy, 1869–1942: Kasumigaseki to Miyakezaka (1977).
- Wood, G. Zay. The twenty-one demands, Japan versus China (1921) online
