= History of political parties in China =

In the history of political parties in China, the first major party in China was the Kuomintang (KMT), which moved to Taiwan in 1949. It was founded in the Republic of Hawaii on November 24, 1894, before being reorganized at Guangdong Province on August 25, 1912, from a union of several revolutionary groups. The Republic of China was founded by Kuomintang's leader Sun Yat-sen later that year. In 1921, the Chinese Communist Party (CCP) was founded by Chen Duxiu and Li Dazhao in Shanghai as a study society, and an informal political network.

During the Chinese Civil War, the CCP's military wing, the People's Liberation Army, defeated the Kuomintang's National Revolutionary Army (later the Republic of China Army) in 1949. The Kuomintang leadership fled mainland China, and re-established itself in Taiwan.

== History ==
The emblems of the Kuomintang and the Chinese Communist Party, the two major political parties in China.

After the founding of the Republic of China in 1912, a plethora of parties appeared to compete for the upcoming National Assembly elections. The four largest winners were the Nationalist Party representing revolutionaries, the Republican Party representing militarists, the Unity Party representing the gentry, and the Democratic Party representing former constitutional monarchists. The latter three merged to form the Progressive Party in 1913. After the failed Second Revolution against Yuan Shikai, the Nationalist leadership fled China and regrouped as the Chinese Revolutionary Party. The Progressives were split into pro- and anti-Yuan factions during the National Protection War.

During the Warlord Era, the Chinese Revolutionary Party which ruled in southern China renamed itself as the Chinese Nationalist Party in 1919. Meanwhile, the Beiyang government in northern China held its own elections in 1918 which were won by the Anfu Club and followed by the Communications Clique and the Research Clique (successors to the Progressives). The Anfu Club dissolved after the 1920 Zhili–Anhui War, the Communications Clique in the Northern Expedition, and the Research Clique after the 1924 Beijing Coup.

The CCP, formed in 1921, entered into a united front with the Nationalists in 1923 to defeat the warlords. The right-wing Young China Party (YCP) appeared in 1923. Following the 1925 Yunnan–Guangxi War, ex-Nationalists who adhered to the expelled Chen Jiongming and Tang Jiyao created the China Public Interest Party (CPIP). During the Northern Expedition, the Communists were purged from the united front while the Nationalists set up their one-party state. Left-wing Nationalists and non-doctrinaire Communists formed the genesis of the Chinese Peasants' and Workers' Democratic Party (CPWDP) in the wake of the purge.

In 1935, former members of the Research Clique created the Chinese National Socialist Party, they were known as the Socialists to avoid confusion with the German Nazis. The CPWDP joined the short-lived Productive People's Party in the Fujian Rebellion.. During the Second Sino-Japanese War, the YCP, CPWDP, and the Socialists formed the China Democratic League (CDL), as an umbrella group, to fight the Japanese while providing for a "Third Way". After the war, the YCP and the Socialists, joined the Nationalists in Taiwan. The Revolutionary Committee of the Kuomintang, CPWDP, CDL, and the CPIP joined the Communists' United Front which also included several political pressure groups.

== Political parties in China (1912–1949) ==
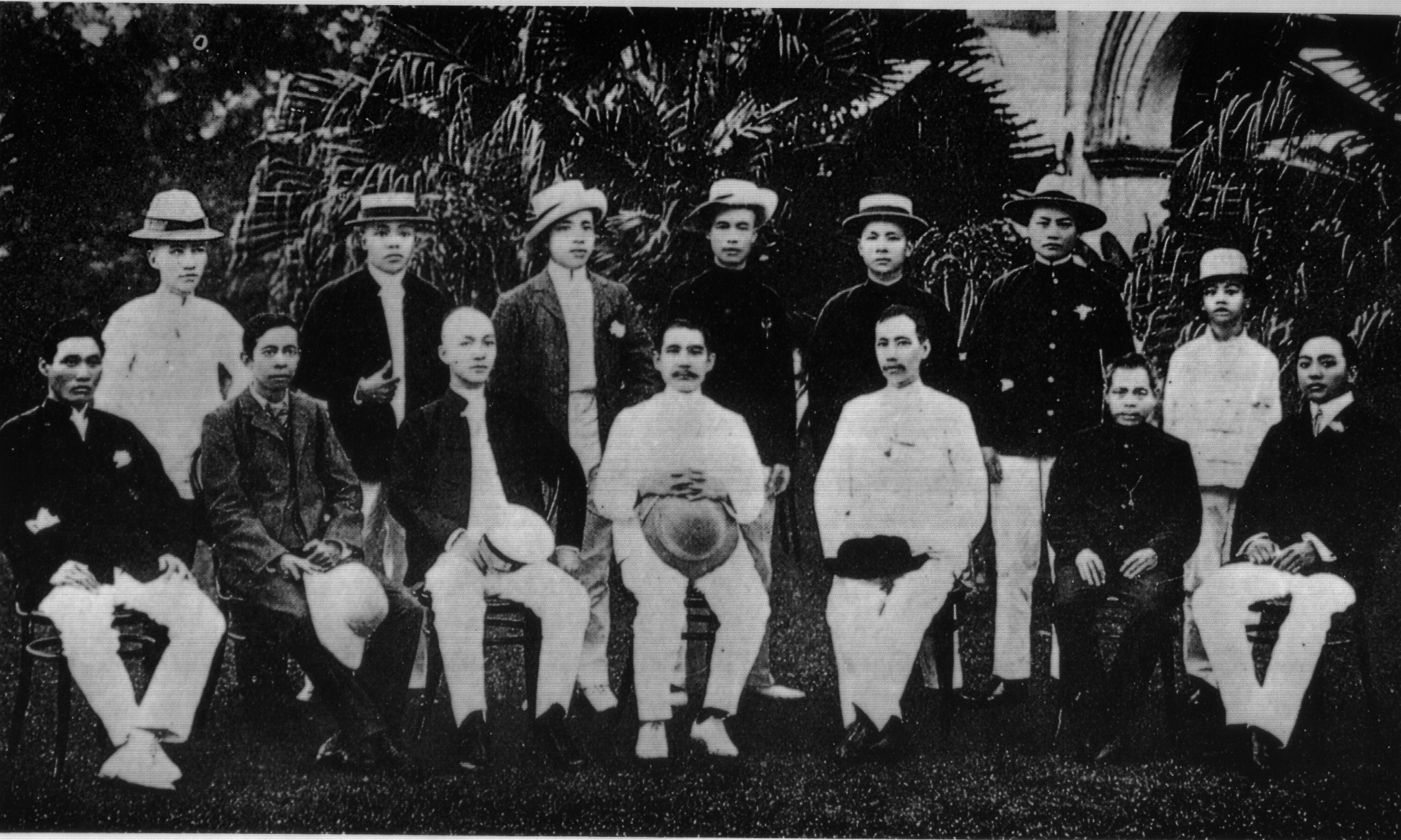
Tongmenghui.

The Republic of China was founded by the Kuomintang (KMT) leader Dr. Sun Yat-sen in 1912. The Kuomintang's prior revolutionary political group, the Revive China Society, was founded on 24 November 1894. It later merged with various other revolutionary groups to form the Tongmenghui in 1905. In August 1911, the Tongmenghui further merged with various other political parties in Beijing to form the KMT. In July 1914, the KMT re-organized itself as the "Chinese Revolutionary Party" in Tokyo, Japan. In 1919, the party officially renamed itself as "Kuomintang of China", which literally translates to "Chinese Nationalist Party". It was China's first major political party. In 1921, the CCP was founded by Chen Duxiu and Li Dazhao in Shanghai as a study society and an informal network. Slowly, the CCP began to grow. These were the two major political parties in China, during the time when the ROC ruled mainland China from 1911 to 1949.

During the Chinese Civil War, the CCP-led People's Liberation Army defeated the National Revolutionary Army of the Kuomintang in 1949. The Kuomintang had no choice but to leave mainland China and move to Taiwan. It continued to use the name "Republic of China" even though the CCP claimed that the Republic of China ceased to exist after 1949.

- Kuomintang
- United Republic party
- Unity Party
- Progressive Party
- Democratic Party
- Republican Party
- Anfu Club
- Communications Clique
- People Constitution Party
- Association of Political Friendship
- China Socialism Party
- Citizen Party
- Dazhong Party
- Chongqing Communist Party
- Oriental Communist Party
- Chinese Youth Communist Party
- Productive People's Party
- China Democratic League
  - China Democratic Socialist Party
  - Young China Party
  - Chinese Peasants' and Workers' Democratic Party
- Kuomintang (Wang Jingwei)

== See also ==
- Democracy in China
- Republic of China (1912–1949)
- List of political parties in mainland China
- List of political parties in Hong Kong
- List of political parties in Macau
- List of political parties in Taiwan
