= 1912–13 Chinese National Assembly election =

1912 Chinese National Assembly elections
- December 1912 − February 1913

All 870 seats in the National Assembly (274 seats in the Senate and 596 seats in the House of Representatives)
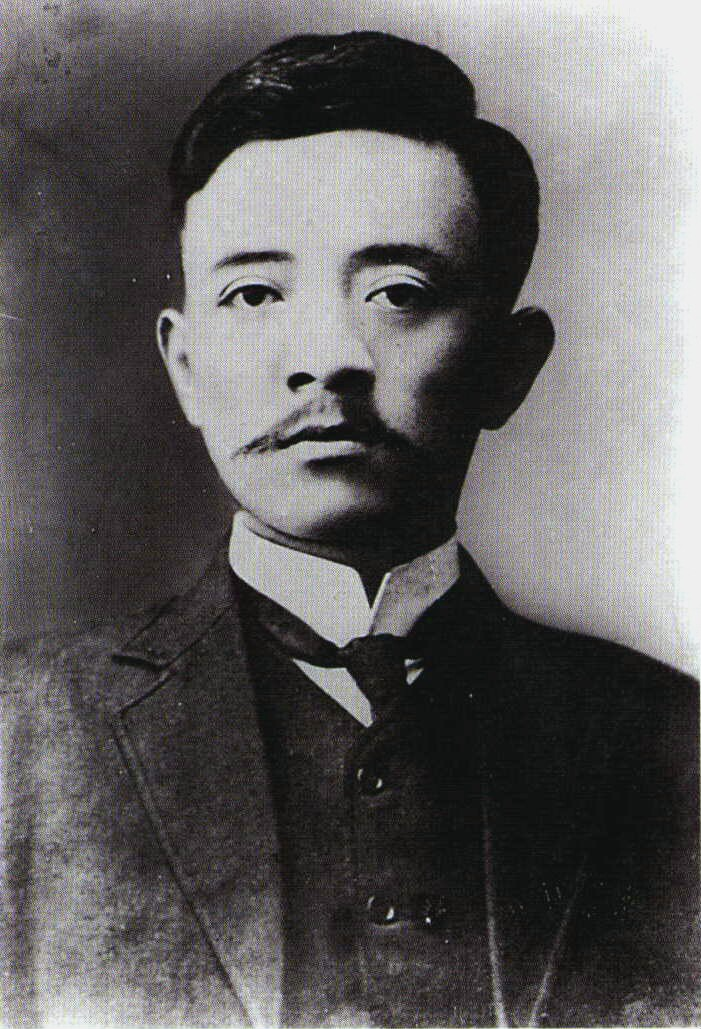

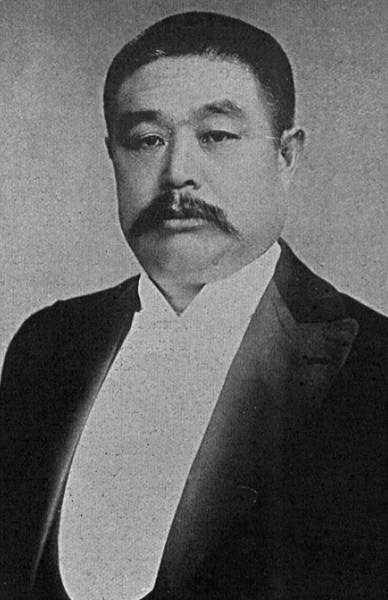

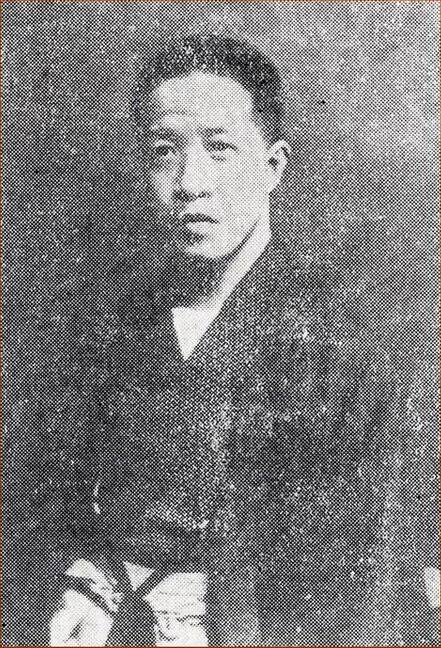

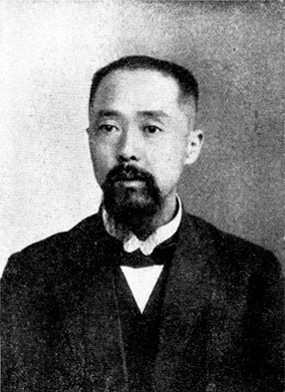
	First party	Second party
Leader	Song Jiaoren	Li Yuanhong
Party	Kuomintang	Republican
Senate	132	46
House	269	120
	Third party	Fourth party
Leader	Zhang Binglin	Tang Hualong
Party	Unity	Democratic
Senate	6	8
House	18	16
Premier before election
Zhao Bingjun
Nonpartisan
Elected Premier
Zhao Bingjun
Nonpartisan

The 1912 Chinese National Assembly elections, held in December 1912 to February 1913, were the first nation-wide elections for the newly founded National Assembly of the Republic of China, which was a bicameral parliament with a Senate and a House of Representatives. This assembly was called by the Chinese the Old Congress (laoguohui) to differentiate it from the future assemblies.

== Overview ==
The election was indirect, as voters chose some 30,000 electors who chose about 2,000 members of the provincial assemblies and 596 members of the House of Representatives. The election was conducted relatively fairly, although some claim that this system had caused instances of bribery, duress, and violence.

The 274-member Senate were elected by the provincial assemblies who themselves had been elected in 1909 during the Qing dynasty.

Adult males over the age of 21 who were educated or owned property and paid taxes, and who could prove a two-year residency in a particular county, could vote. An estimated 40 million or 4-6% of China's population were registered for the election. This was an increase from the size of the electorate in the 1909 Chinese provincial elections, when less than 1% of the population was enfranchised.

The president had to pick the 64 members representing Tibet, Outer Mongolia, and Overseas Chinese due to the fact that the government in Beijing did not exercise enough control over these populations to organize elections. Despite the compromises, this election had the participation of over 300 civic groups and was the first and most competitive nationwide election in Chinese history.

The Kuomintang (Chinese Nationalist Party) led by Song Jiaoren won a plurality in both houses of the assembly, and Song was expected to become the Premier of China. After losing the election, the Republican, Unity, and Democratic (formerly Constitutionalist) parties merged into the Progressive Party with Liang Qichao as leader. The Progressive Party became the main rival to the Nationalists.

Song was assassinated on 20 March 1913 in Shanghai. When the assembly convened for the first time on April 8 amid heated debate over the assassination, the Nationalists were divided over solutions on how to deal with Yuan Shikai, the provisional president, who was suspected of ordering the assassination. On 12 July, Sun Yat-sen led the Nationalists to launch an armed rebellion against Yuan, historically known as the Second Revolution. However, the Second Revolution was defeated within two months by Yuan's forces.

The National Assembly members were compromised by threats and bribes from Yuan. He confined the National Assembly (Congress) and forced them to elect him as the formal president in the October presidential election. Soon, Yuan outlawed the Nationalists and expelled them from the assembly. Without a quorum, the National Assembly could not convene. Consequently, Yuan disbanded this assembly (congress) on 10 January 1914. In other words, this body existed for only nine months, yet it left an enduring legacy to China as the first democratic experiment.

== Voter and seat distributions ==
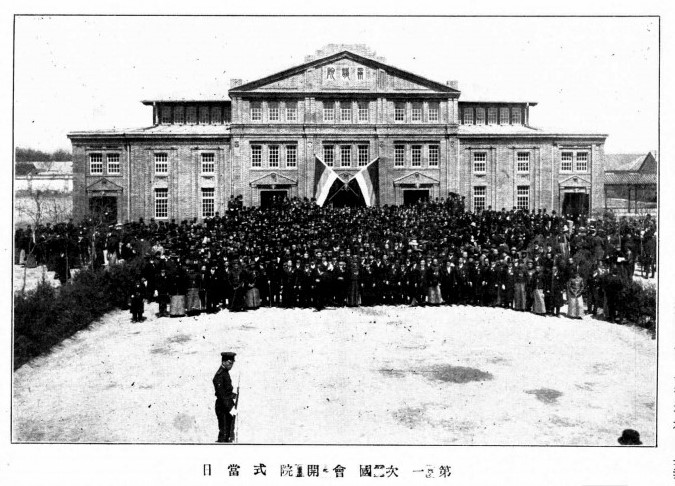
The inaugural meeting of the National Assembly in April 1913.

Electoral district	Population	Voters	%	House Seats	Senate Seats
Zhili	25,932,133	9,195,757	35.46	46	10
Fengtian	12,133,303	896,408	7.39	16	10
Jilin	5,580,030	108,835	1.95	10	10
Heilongjiang	2,028,776	288,234	14.21	10	10
Shandong	30,987,853	1,368,184	4.42	33	10
Henan	35,900,038	1,688,632	4.70	32	10
Shanxi	12,269,386	2,588,068	21.10	28	10
Jiangsu	32,282,781	1,939,386	6.01	40	10
Anhui	16,229,052	1,450,901	8.94	27	10
Jiangxi	23,987,317	4,986,883	20.79	35	10
Fujian	15,849,296	1,283,348	8.10	24	10
Zhejiang	21,440,151	1,184,629	5.53	38	10
Hubei	25,590,308	5,670,370	22.16	26	10
Hunan	27,390,230	1,277,414	4.66	27	10
Shaanxi	10,271,096	1,395,622	2.98	21	10
Gansu	4,989,907	148,526	2.98	14	10
Xinjiang	2,000,000	9,506	0.48	10	10
Sichuan	48,129,596	1,729,368	3.59	35	10
Guangdong	28,010,560	1,966,516	7.02	30	10
Guangxi	8,746,747	2,731,717	31.23	19	10
Yunnan	9,466,965	233,398	2.47	22	10
Guizhou	9,665,227	792,290	8.20	13	10
Inner Mongolia	—	—	—	27	27
Tibet Area	—	—	—	10	10
Qinghai	—	—	—	3	3
Oversea Chinese	—	—	—	0	6
Central Society	—	—	—	0	8
Total	406,880,486	42,933,992	10.50	596	274

== Results ==
Party	Seats	
Party	Senate	House
Kuomintang	132	269
Republican Party	46	120
Unity Party	6	18
Democratic Party	8	16
Multi-party candidates	38	147
Independents	44	26
Total	274	596

== Presidential elections in National Assembly ==
An important function of the National Assembly under the Provisional Constitution of the Republic of China was to elect the President and Vice President of China. The following elections were held by the 1st National Assembly of Beiyang government.

Presidential elections by the National Assembly elected in 1912–13
Order	Presidential Election	President	Vice President	Note
1st	1913 Chinese presidential election	Yuan Shikai	Li Yuanhong	First formal presidential election in Chinese history
1st	1916 Chinese vice-presidential election	—	Feng Guozhang	To replace the vacancy of Li Yuanhong as he sworn in as the President after Yuan Shikai's death.
3rd	1923 Chinese presidential election	Cao Kun	—	Resumed session after First Zhili–Fengtian War

- The 2nd Presidential election was held by the 2nd National Assembly elected in 1918

== See also ==
- 1909 Chinese provincial elections
- History of the Republic of China
- National Assembly (Beiyang government)
- History of the Kuomintang
- Progressive Party (China)
- History of Beijing

== Bibliography ==
- Twitchett, Denis; Fairbank, John K, eds. (1983). The Cambridge History of China. Vol. 12, Part 1. Cambridge University Press. ISBN 978-0-521-23541-9.
