= 1918 Chinese presidential election =

← 1913	4 September 1918	1923 →
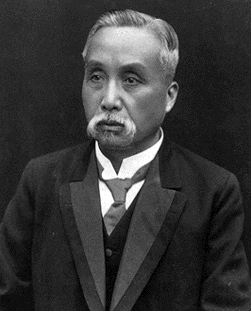

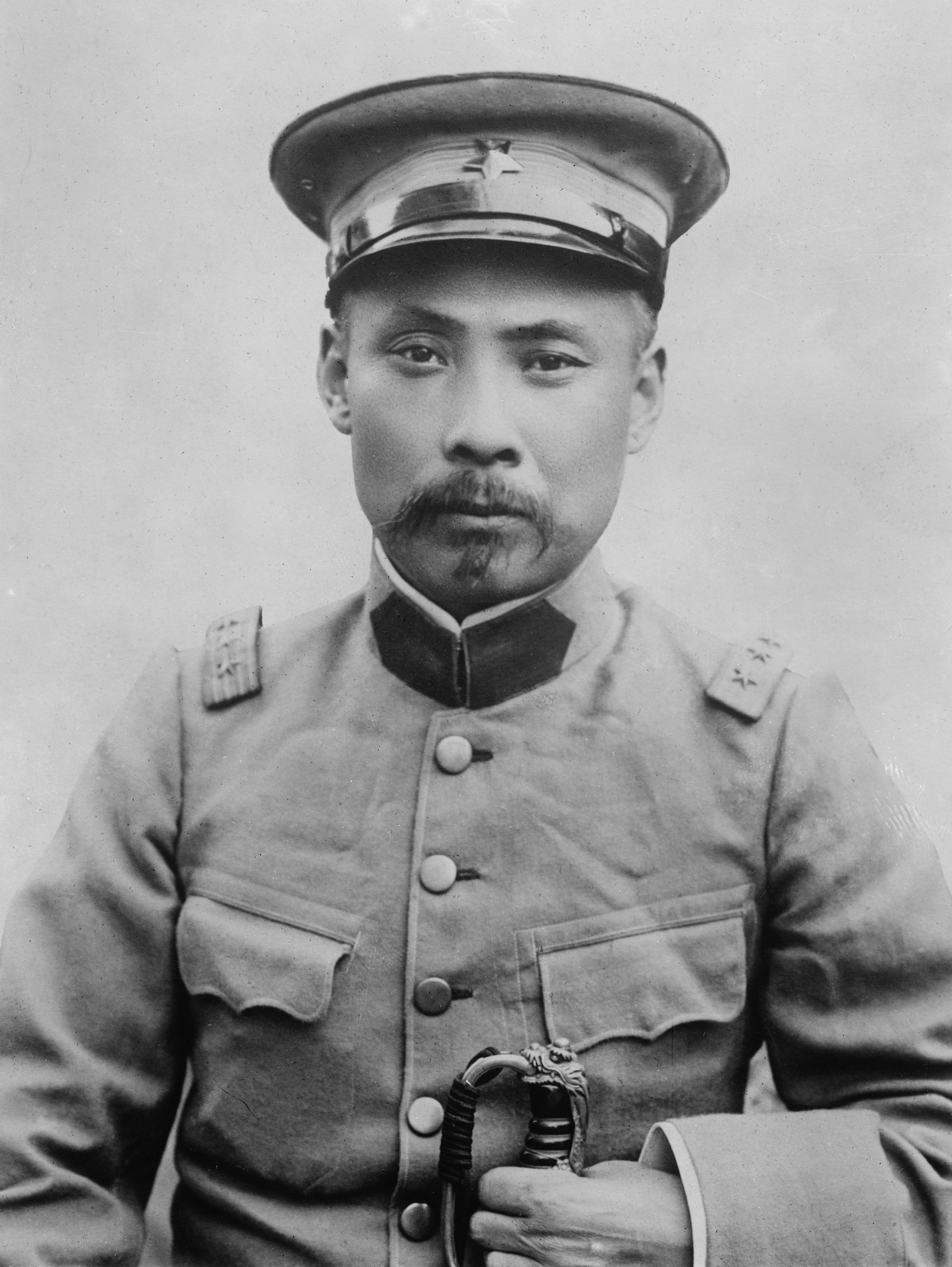
Nominee	Xu Shichang	Duan Qirui
Party	Independent	Anhui clique
Electoral vote	425	5
Percentage	98.15%	1.15%
President before election
Feng Guozhang
Zhili clique
Elected President
Xu Shichang
Independent

The 1918 Chinese presidential election were the elections held on 4 September 1918 in Beijing for the second term of the President of China. Xu Shichang was elected by two houses of the National Assembly which were controlled by the Anfu Club formed in the National Assembly election in the same year.

Feng Guozhang's term as president expired on 10 October 1918. He did not seek re-election provided Duan Qirui retired as Premier on the same day. Xu Shichang, a veteran statesman and was seen as being a fairly neutral mediator between different factions and between the North and South.

Though the Anfu Club promised the vice-presidency to Cao Kun, the Communications Clique prevented the two-thirds quorum required for his election and left the office vacant.

The Guangzhou Government denounced the "new" parliament as illegal and refused to recognize the election of Xu Shichang as legitimate. The "old" National Assembly elected in 1912 attained a quorum on 6 August in Guangzhou and declared it would not recognize any activities of the body meeting in Beijing, including the presidential election or any mandates or agreements made.

== Results ==
=== President ===
Candidate	Party	Votes	%
Xu Shichang	Independent	425	98.15
Duan Qirui	Anhui clique	5	1.15
Wang Shizhen	Independent	1	0.23
Zhang Jian	Independent	1	0.23
Ni Sichong	Anhui clique	1	0.23
Total		433	100.00

== See also ==
- History of the Republic of China
- President of the Republic of China
- 1918 Chinese National Assembly election
