= Provisional Senate =

Provisional Senate of the Republic of China 中華民國臨時參議院
- National Emblem of the Republic of China

Type
- Type: Unicameral house of Beiyang government

History
- Founded: 28 January 1912
- Disbanded: 8 April 1913
- Preceded by: United Assembly of Representatives of the Provincial Military Governments
- Succeeded by: National Assembly

Leadership
- Speaker: Li Zhaofu (final)
- Deputy Speaker: Tang Hualong (final)

Structure
- Seats: 126
- Committees: 6 (Whole House, Legal System, Finance, Home Affairs, Petitions, Reprimand)

Meeting place
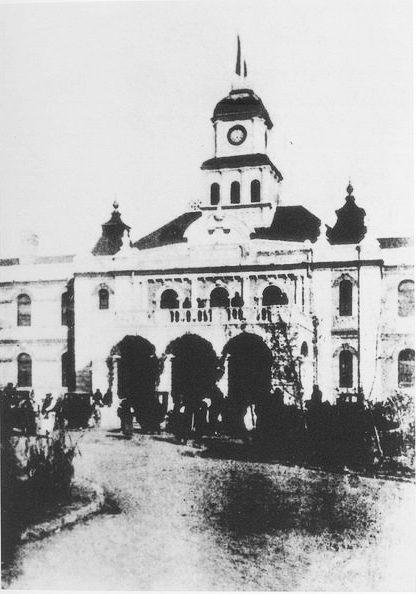
- Kiangsu Provincial Assembly Building, Nanking (until April 1912)
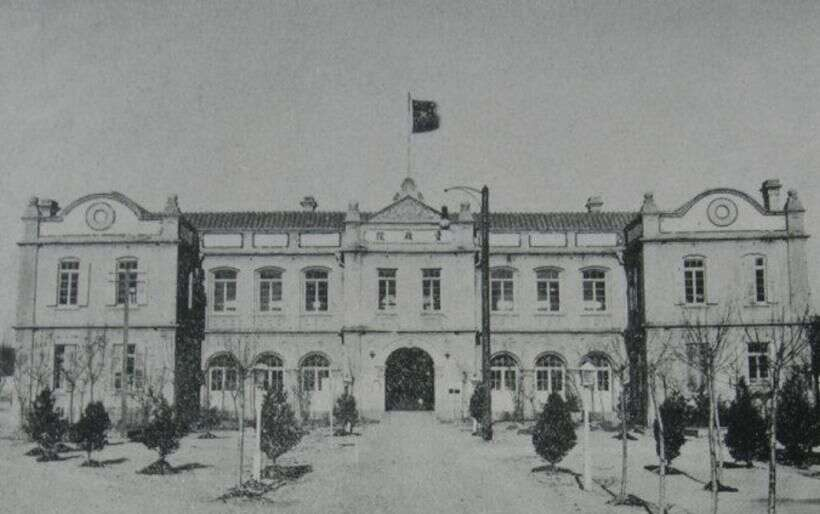
- Advisory Council Building, Peking (since April 1912)

Constitution
- Organizational Outline of the Provisional Government of the Republic of China; Provisional Constitution of the Republic of China

Provisional Senate of the Republic of China (Chinese: 中華民國臨時參議院), also translated to Advisory Council, was the temporary legislature established in the earlier Beiyang years of the Republic of China, before the National Assembly was formed. The first Provisional Senate lasted from 1912 to 1913, and the second from 1917 to 1918.

== History ==
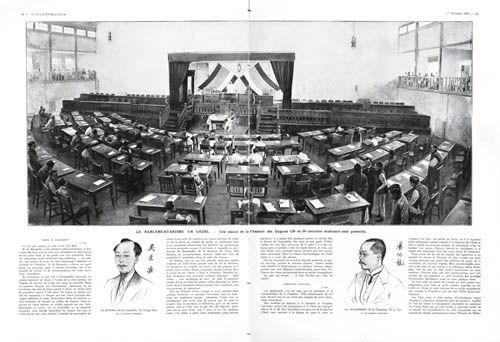
French L'Illustration report on Peking senate on 1 February 1913. Portraits of speaker Wu Ching-lien (left) and deputy Tang Hualong (right) were shown

=== In Nanking ===
On New Year's Day 1912, Sun Yat-sen assumed office as the Provisional President of the Republic of China, and thus the Provisional Government began. An earlier United Assembly of Representatives of the Provincial Military Governments, which selected Sun, started to act on behalf of the Senate on the next day, followed by choosing the temporary speaker and deputy speaker and amending the Organizational Outline of the Provisional Government of the Republic of China (中華民國臨時政府組織大綱), which governs the establishment of the Provisional Senate. At 11 a.m. on 28 January, the Provisional Senate, with 43 members, was formally opened in Nanking, at the Kiangsu Provincial Assembly Building, thereby dissolving the assembly.

Discussions over enacting the Provisional Constitution of the Republic of China began on 7 February. Five days later Puyi abdicated as emperor of Qing dynasty, sending Yuan Shikai to form a republican government. Yuan was elected as the Provisional President on 15 February, succeeding Sun as part of the negotiated deal. The Provisional Constitution was adopted on 8 March. This was followed by other pieces of legislation such as the Senate Act (參議院法), and standing order and internal rules of the senate.

The Provisional Government and the Provisional Senate subsequently relocated to Peking, following two motions passed on 2 April, for the government, and on 4 April, for the legislature. The session adjourned on 8 April, and subsequently resumed on 29 April at the opening ceremony in Peking.

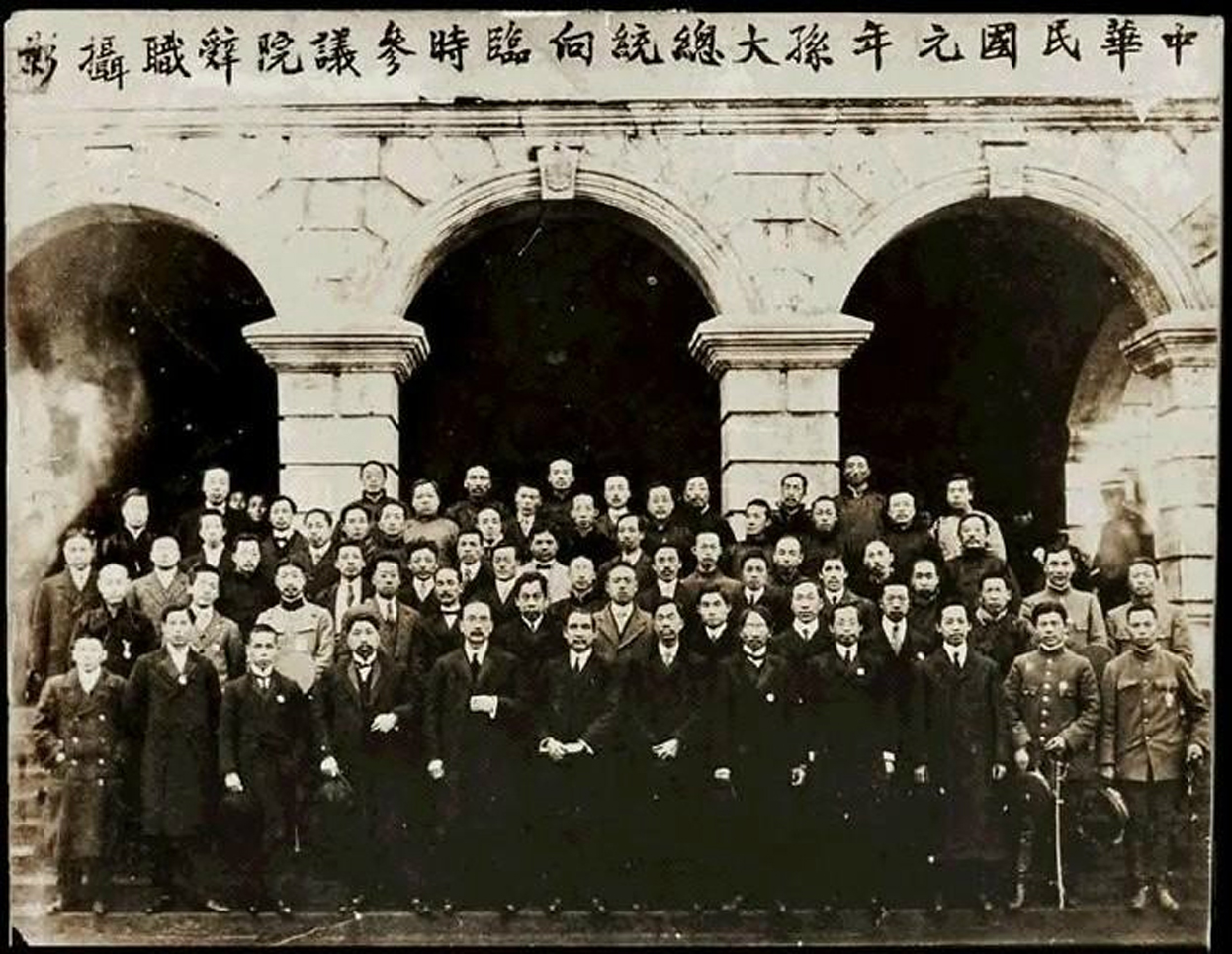
Members of the Nanking senate on 1 April 1912 upon the resignation of Sun Yat-sen as Provisional President

=== In Peking ===
Apart from Tibetan members, senators across the new nation attended the Peking senate, situated in the former Qing-era Advisory Council Building. One of the amendments to the Organizational Outline passed was to expand the assembly to include Qinghai members. Amongst the other legislations adopted were election laws for senators and representatives, organizational acts of the National Assembly and the State Council. The Senate also established the Mongolian and Tibetan Affairs Agency, regulated the executive grades and salaries, unified the national flag, and introduced duty stamp.

Peking senate was succeeded by the National Assembly on 8 April 1913 when they convened the inaugural sitting.

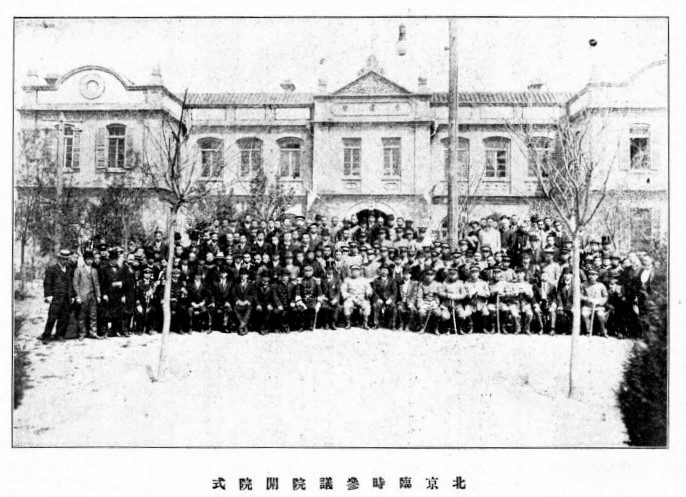
Opening ceremony of Peking Senate

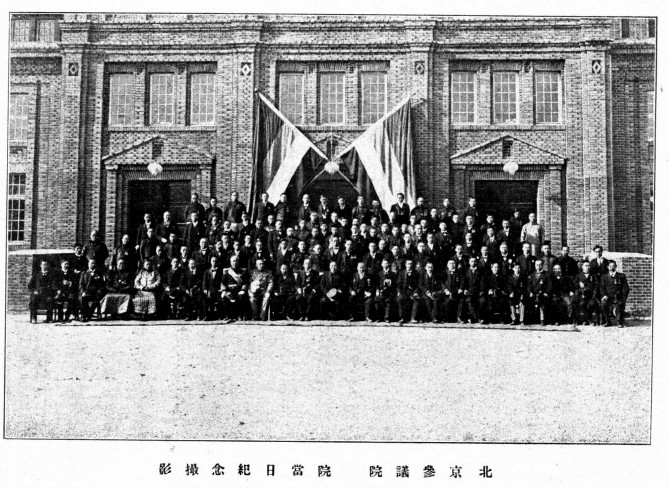
Closing ceremony of Peking Senate

== Power ==
During the Peking era, the powers of the Provisional Senate as dictated by the Provisional Constitution were -

- To pass all law bills;
- To pass the budgets of the Provisional Government;
- To pass laws of taxation, of currency and of weights and measures for the whole country;
- To pass measurts for the calling of public loans and to conclude contracts affecting the national treasury;
- To give consent to matters in relation to granting amnesty, appointing members of the State Council (or cabinet) and ambassadors;
- To reply to inquiries from the Provisional Government;
- To receive and consider petitions of citizens;
- To make suggestions to the government on legal or other matters;
- To introduce interpellations to members of the cabinet and to insist on their being present in the Council in making replies thereto;
- To insist on the government investigating into any alleged bribery and infringement of laws by officials;
- To impeach the Provisional President for high treason, by a majority vote of three-fourths of the quorum consisting of more than four-fifths of the total number of the members;
- To impeach members of the cabinet for failure to perform their official duties or for violation of the law, by majority votes of two-thirds of the quorum consisting of over three-fourths of the total number of the members.

The senators also elected the Provisional President and the Provisional Vice-President, and may amend the Provisional Constitution. With the consent of the Provisional Senate, the Provisional President may declare war or ratify a treaty.

== Members ==
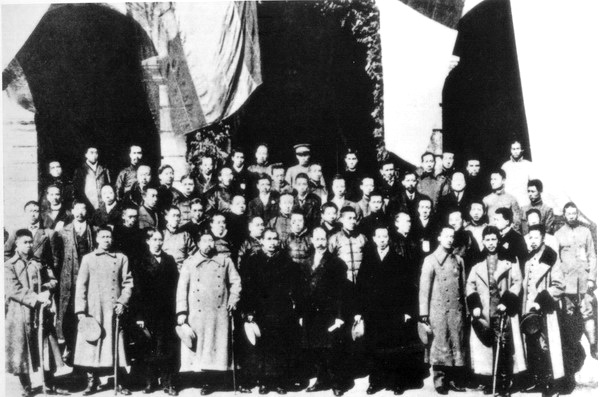

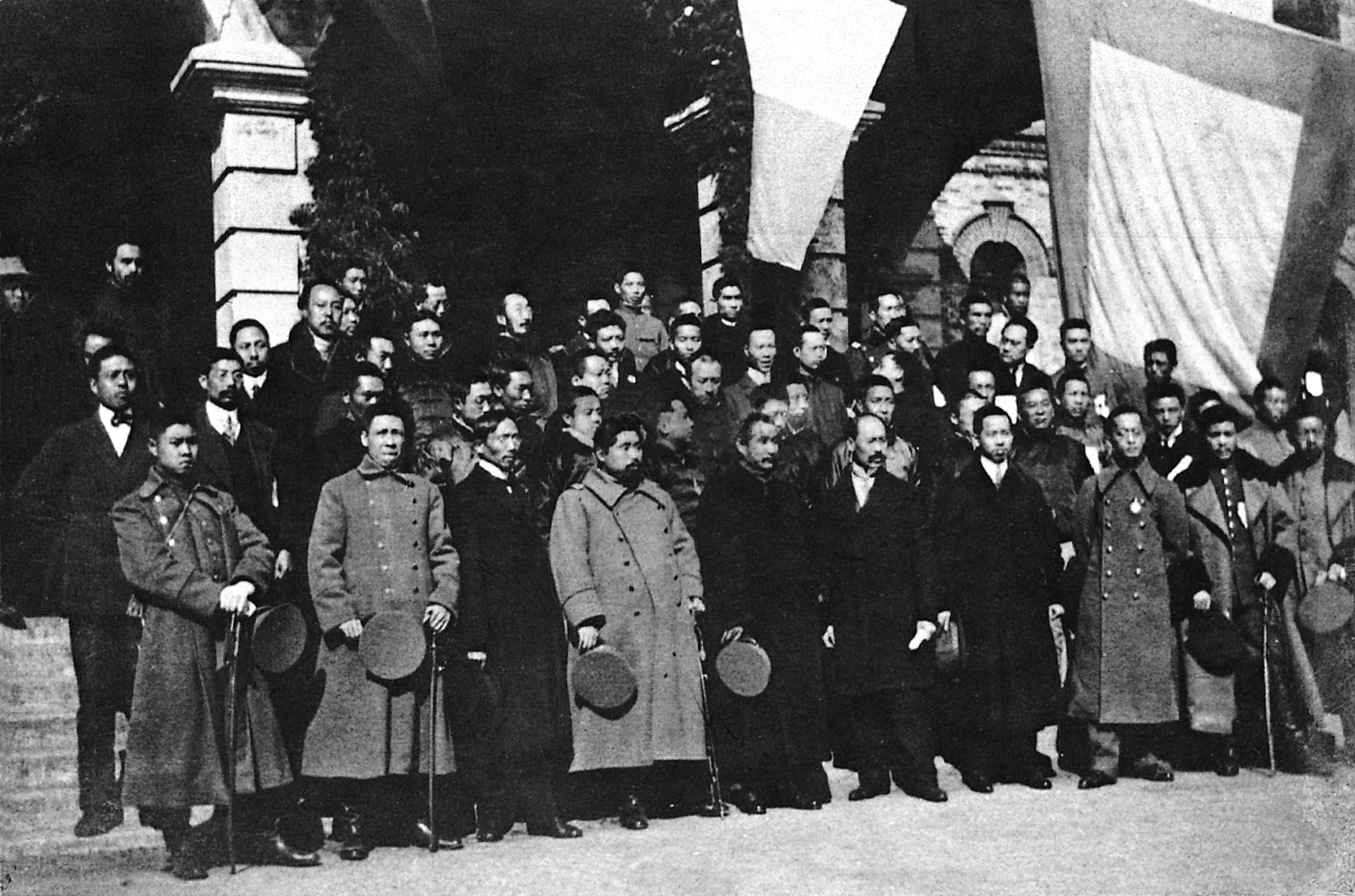
Members of the Provisional Government, Provisional President's office, and the Provisional Senate prepared to depart for Xiao Mausoleum to commemorate Hongwu Emperor of Ming dynasty

The Organizational Outline only provided that each province should send at most three senators. On the date of founding the Provisional Senate had a total of 42 members, including 30 formal members (from Guangdong, Hubei, Hunan, Zhejiang, Jiangsu, Anhui, Jiangxi, Shanxi, Fujian, Guangxi) and 12 representatives (from Kweichow, Yunnan, Shensi, Szechwan, Fengtien, Chihli, Honan) acting on behalf of the senators that were yet to report duty. The size grew to 45, or 39 as media reports varied, on 1 March.

According to Article 18 of the Provisional Constitution which came into effect on 11 March, each of the 22 provinces, Inner and Outer Mongolia, and Tibet shall elect five members to the Provisional Senate and one for Chinghai. This gives the total number of senators at 126. However, not all members were deputed throughout the session.

List of provisional senators verified to be in office
| Province | Senator | | Session |
|---|---|---|---|
| Chihli | Ku Chung-hsin | Assumed office on 28 Jan | Nanking |
| Chihli | 王振垚 | Assumed office by 4 May | Peking |
| Chihli | 籍忠寅 | Assumed office by 6 May | Peking |
| Chihli | 李榘 | Assumed office by 4 May | Peking |
| Chihli | 谷芝瑞 | Assumed office by 4 May | Peking |
| Fengtien | Wu Ching-lien | Assumed office on 28 Jan | Nanking |
| Fengtien | 劉興甲 | Assumed office on 29 Apr | Peking |
| Fengtien | 曾有翼 | Assumed office by 4 May | Peking |
| Fengtien | 李秉恕 | Assumed office by 4 May | Peking |
| Fengtien | 孫孝宗 | Assumed office by 4 May | Peking |
| Kirin | 王樹聲 (民國) | Assumed office by 4 May | Peking |
| Kirin | 金鼎勛 | Assumed office by 4 May | Peking |
| Kirin | 楊策 | Assumed office by 4 May | Peking |
| Kirin | 何裕康 | Assumed office by 4 May | Peking |
| Kirin | 李芳 (吉林議員) | Assumed office by 4 May | Peking |
| Heilungkiang | 高家驥 | Assumed office by 4 May | Peking |
| Heilungkiang | 王赤卿 | Assumed office by 4 May | Peking |
| Heilungkiang | 戰雲霽 | Assumed office on 17 May | Peking |
| Heilungkiang | 關文鐸 | Assumed office on 13 May | Peking |
| Heilungkiang | 薛珠 | ? | Peking |
| Heilungkiang | 喜山 | Assumed office on 12 Jul substituting 薛珠 | Peking |
| Honan | 李槃 (滿洲國) | Assumed office on 28 Jan | Nanking |
| Honan | 陳景南 | Assumed office on 25 Mar; assumed office on 29 Apr | Nanking, Peking |
| Honan | 丁廷騫 | Assumed office on 25 Mar | Nanking |
| Honan | 張善與 | Assumed office on 25 Mar | Nanking |
| Honan | 李載賡 | Assumed office on 25 Mar | Nanking |
| Honan | 阮慶瀾 | Assumed office by 4 May | Peking |
| Honan | 劉積學 | Assumed office by 4 May | Peking |
| Honan | 孫鐘 | Assumed office by 4 May | Peking |
| Honan | 杜潛 | Assumed office by 4 May | Peking |
| Shantung | Peng Zhanyuan | Assumed office on 27 Feb | Nanking |
| Shantung | 劉星楠 | Assumed office on 4 Mar | Nanking, Peking |
| Shantung | 史澤咸 | Assumed office on 26 Mar after 22 Mar by-election | Nanking |
| Shantung | 于洪起 | Assumed office on 26 Mar after 22 Mar by-election | Nanking |
| Shantung | 陳命官 | Assumed office on 26 Mar after 22 Mar by-election | Nanking |
| Shantung | 丁世嶧 | Assumed office by 4 May | Peking |
| Shantung | 周樹標 | Assumed office by 4 May | Peking |
| Shantung | 王丕煦 | Disqualified for not assuming office within 20 days after appointment | Peking |
| Shantung | 侯延爽 | Assumed office on 10 June succeeding 王丕煦 | Peking |
| Shansi | 李素 (民國) | Assumed office on 28 Jan after appointed by Shanxi Provincial Assembly | Nanking, Peking |
| Shansi | 劉懋賞 | Assumed office on 28 Jan after appointed by Shanxi Provincial Assembly; resigned in early Jun | Nanking, Peking |
| Shansi | Ching Yao-yueh | Appointed on 31 Jan by Shanxi Provincial Assembly; resigned by early Feb after appointed as executive official | Nanking |
| Shansi | 宋汝梅 | Assumed office by 4 May | Peking |
| Shansi | 張聯魁 | Assumed office by 4 May | Peking |
| Shansi | 劉盥訓 | Assumed office by 4 May | Peking |
| Shansi | 苗雨潤 | Assumed office on 4 Jul succeeding 劉懋賞 | Peking |
| Shensi | 趙世鈺 | Assumed office on 28 Jan | Nanking, Peking |
| Shensi | 张蔚森 | Appointed on 31 Jan; absent thereafter | Nanking |
| Shensi | 馬步雲 | Appointed on 31 Jan; assumed office on 5 Feb and took leave; absent between 6 and 20 Feb; no records thereafter | Nanking |
| Shensi | 康寶忠 | Substituted 张蔚森 on 14 Feb; absent thereafter; apparently delisted by 1 Mar | Nanking |
| Shensi | 李述膺 | Assumed office by 4 May | Peking |
| Shensi | 景志傅 | Assumed office by 4 May | Peking |
| Shensi | 茹欲立 | Assumed office on 8 May | Peking |
| Shensi | 陳同熙 | Assumed office on 27 May | Peking |
| Hunan | Peng Yunyi | Assumed office on 28 Jan; assumed office on 6 May | Nanking, Peking |
| Hunan | Liu Yan | Assumed office on 28 Jan; assumed office on 6 May | Nanking, Peking |
| Hunan | Ouyang Chen-sen | Assumed office on 28 Jan; assumed office on 29 Apr | Nanking, Peking |
| Hunan | Qin Zhen | Assumed office on 27 Mar; assumed office by 4 May | Nanking, Peking |
| Hunan | 陳家鼎 | Assumed office on 12 Aug | Peking |
| Hupeh | 時功玖 | Assumed office on 27 Mar; resigned on 1 Mar; delisted on 2 Mar; assumed office on 29 Apr | Nanking, Peking |
| Hupeh | Chang Pai-leh | Assumed office on 27 Mar; resigned on 1 Mar; delisted on 2 Mar; assumed office on 29 Apr | Nanking, Peking |
| Hupeh | 劉成禺 | Assumed office on 27 Mar; resigned on 1 Mar; delisted on 2 Mar; assumed office on 10 May | Nanking, Peking |
| Hupeh | 田桐 | Assumed office on 25 Mar | Nanking |
| Hupeh | 劉道仁 | Assumed office on 29 Mar | Nanking |
| Hupeh | 胡秉柯 | Assumed office on 1 Apr | Nanking |
| Hupeh | 歐陽啟勛 | Assumed office on 5 Apr | Nanking |
| Hupeh | Zheng Wanzhan | Assumed office on 29 Apr | Peking |
| Anhwei | 常恒芳 | Assumed office on 28 Jan | Nanking |
| Anhwei | 凌毅 | Appointed on 31 Jan | Nanking |
| Anhwei | 范光啟 | Appointed on 28 Jan; no records thereafter | Nanking |
| Anhwei | 胡绍斌 | Assumed office on 29 Feb substituting 范光启 | Nanking |
| Anhwei | 胡璧城 | Assumed office by 4 May | Peking |
| Anhwei | 江辛 | Assumed office on 8 May | Peking |
| Anhwei | 俞道暄 | Assumed office on 8 May | Peking |
| Anhwei | 曹玉德 | Assumed office on 17 May | Peking |
| Anhwei | 王慶雲 (安徽議員) | Assumed office on 27 May | Peking |
| Kiangsu | 楊廷棟 | Appointed on 31 Jan; resigned on 27 Feb but rejected by Senate; delisted on 1 Mar; assumed office on 29 Apr; resigned on 27 Jan 1913 | Nanking, Peking |
| Kiangsu | Chen Taoyi | Assumed office on 31 Jan; resigned on 27 Feb but rejected by Senate; delisted on 1 Mar | Nanking |
| Kiangsu | 凌文淵 | Assumed office on 31 Jan; resigned on 27 Feb but rejected by Senate; delisted on 1 Mar | Nanking |
| Kiangsu | 汪榮寶 | Assumed office on 29 Apr | Peking |
| Kiangsu | 秦瑞玠 | Assumed office by 4 May | Peking |
| Kiangsu | 張鶴第 | Assumed office on 6 May | Peking |
| Kiangsu | 王嘉賓 (民國) | Assumed office on 6 May; resigned in mid Oct | Peking |
| Kiangsu | 王立廷 | In office between 16 Oct and 23 Dec succeeding 王嘉賓 | Peking |
| Kiangsu | 張家鎮 (民國) | Assumed office on 3 Mar 1913 | Peking |
| Kiangsi | Tang Yi | Assumed office on 28 Jan | Nanking |
| Kiangsi | 王有蘭 | Assumed office on 28 Jan | Nanking |
| Kiangsi | Wen Chun | Assumed office on 28 Jan | Nanking |
| Kiangsi | 曾有瀾 | Assumed office on 29 Apr | Peking |
| Kiangsi | 李國珍 (1884年) | Assumed office on 29 Apr | Peking |
| Kiangsi | 陳鴻鈞 | Assumed office on 29 Apr | Peking |
| Kiangsi | 郭同 | Assumed office on 29 Apr | Peking |
| Kiangsi | 盧士模 | Assumed office on 29 Apr; died in office in early Dec due to sickness | Peking |
| Chekiang | Wang Chengting | Appointed on 31 Jan | Nanking |
| Chekiang | Yin Ruli | Assumed office on 28 Jan | Nanking |
| Chekiang | 陳毓川 | Assumed office on 28 Jan; took leave on 1 Feb; resigned on 7 Feb; delisted on 1 Mar | Nanking |
| Chekiang | 黄群 | Assumed office on 25 Mar substituting 陈毓川 | Nanking |
| Chekiang | 周珏 | Assumed office by 4 May | Peking |
| Chekiang | 王文慶 | Assumed office by 4 May | Peking |
| Chekiang | Wang Chia-hsiang | Assumed office on 17 May | Peking |
| Chekiang | 陳時夏 | Assumed office on 17 May | Peking |
| Fukien | Lin Sen | Assumed office on 28 Jan; resigned in early May | Nanking |
| Fukien | 陳承澤 | Assumed office on 28 Jan; resigned in early May | Nanking |
| Fukien | Pan Zuyi | Assumed office on 28 Jan; resigned on 1 Feb; assumed office on 29 April; resigned in early May | Nanking, Peking |
| Fukien | Chang Chi | Assumed office on 1 Feb substituting Pan Zuyi; resigned on 29 Feb | Nanking |
| Fukien | 鄭祖蔭 | Assumed office on 29 Mar substituting Chang Chi; resigned in early May | Nanking |
| Fukien | 李兆年 | Assumed office on 7 Jun | Peking |
| Fukien | 周翰 (北京臨時參議院議員) | Assumed office on 17 Jun | Peking |
| Fukien | 連賢基 | Assumed office on 17 Jun | Peking |
| Fukien | 林翰 | Assumed office on 17 Jun; resigned on 24 Feb 1913 | Peking |
| Fukien | 劉崇佑 | Assumed office on 19 Jun | Peking |
| Kwangtung | 趙仕北 | Assumed office on 28 Jan | Nanking |
| Kwangtung | 錢樹芬 | Appointed on 31 Jan | Nanking |
| Kwangtung | Chiu Feng-chia | Appointed on 31 Jan; absent thereafter; retired in early Feb due to health | Nanking |
| Kwangtung | 金章 | Assumed office on 13 Mar substituting | Nanking |
| Kwangtung | Yang Yung-tai | Assumed office by 4 May | Peking |
| Kwangtung | 梁孝肅 | Assumed office by 4 May | Peking |
| Kwangtung | 盧信 | Assumed office by 4 May | Peking |
| Kwangtung | Hsu Fu-lin | Assumed office on 8 May | Peking |
| Kwangtung | 司徒穎 | Assumed office on 8 May | Peking |
| Kwangsi | 鄧家彥 | Assumed office on 28 Jan; assumed office by 4 May; resigned in mid May | Nanking, Peking |
| Kwangsi | Tseng Yen | Appointed on 31 Jan; assumed office on 5 Mar | Nanking |
| Kwangsi | 朱文劭 | Appointed on 31 Jan; no record thereafter | Nanking |
| Kwangsi | 劉崛 | Assumed office on 8 Mar substituting 朱文劭; assumed office by 4 May; resigned in mid May | Nanking, Peking |
| Kwangsi | 黃宏憲 | Assumed office on 26 Sep | Peking |
| Kwangsi | 蒙啟勛 | Assumed office on 7 Oct | Peking |
| Kwangsi | 陳太龍 | In office between mid Oct and 23 Dec | Peking |
| Kwangsi | 李拔超 | In office between 16 Oct and 23 Dec | Peking |
| Szechwan | 張懋隆 | Assumed office on 28 Jan; left office on 5 Feb | Nanking |
| Szechwan | Wu Yung-shan | Assumed office on 28 Jan; left office on 5 Feb | Nanking |
| Szechwan | 周代本 | Assumed office on 28 Jan; left office on 5 Feb | Nanking |
| Szechwan | 黄樹中 | Assumed office on 5 Feb; assumed office by 4 May; left office in mid July | Nanking, Peking |
| Szechwan | Li Zhaofu | Assumed office on 5 Feb; assumed office on 29 Apr | Nanking, Peking |
| Szechwan | 熊成章 | Assumed office on 5 Feb; assumed office on 29 Apr; resigned on 24 Mar 1913 | Nanking, Peking |
| Szechwan | 劉聲元 | Assumed office on 7 Aug | Peking |
| Szechwan | 鄧鎔 | Assumed office on 20 Aug | Peking |
| Szechwan | 楊芬 (民國) | Assumed office on 30 Sep | Peking |
| Yunnan | 段宇清 | Assumed office on 28 Jan; assumed office by 4 May | Nanking, Peking |
| Yunnan | Chang Yao-tseng | Assumed office on 17 Feb | Nanking |
| Yunnan | 席聘臣 | Assumed office on 15 Mar; assumed office on 8 May | Nanking, Peking |
| Yunnan | 顧視高 | Assumed office by 4 May | Peking |
| Yunnan | 張華瀾 | Assumed office on 20 Jun | Peking |
| Kweichow | 文崇高 | Assumed office on 28 Jan as representative to Guizhou commandary 楊藎誠; suspected not formally appointed | Nanking |
| Kweichow | 平剛 | Assumed office on 28 Jan as representative to Guizhou commandary 楊藎誠; suspected not formally appointed | Nanking |
| Kweichow | 姚華 | Assumed office on 28 May | Peking |
| Kweichow | 劉顯治 | Assumed office on 10 Jun | Peking |
| Kweichow | 陳國祥 (光緒進士) | Assumed office on 10 Jun | Peking |
| Kweichow | 陳廷策 | Assumed office on 12 Jun | Peking |
| Gansu | 王鑫潤 | Assumed office by 4 May | Peking |
| Gansu | 田駿豐 | Assumed office by 4 May | Peking |
| Gansu | 宋振聲 | Assumed office by 4 May | Peking |
| Gansu | 吳鈞 | Assumed office by 4 May | Peking |
| Gansu | 秦望瀾 | Assumed office by 4 May; rsigned on 3 Feb 1913 | Peking |
| Gansu | 魏承耀 | In office between 16 Oct and 23 Dec | Peking |
| Tsinghai | 唐古色 | Assumed office on 29 Apr | Peking |
| Sinkiang | 劉熺 | Assumed office on 27 Jun | Peking |
| Sinkiang | 蔣舉清 | Assumed office on 9 July | Peking |
| Mongolia | 博迪蘇 | Assumed office on 29 Apr | Peking |
| Mongolia | 熙凌阿 | Assumed office on 29 Apr | Peking |
| Mongolia | 達賚 (內蒙古人物) | Assumed office on 29 Apr | Peking |
| Mongolia | 祺誠武 | Assumed office by 4 May | Peking |
| Mongolia | 鄂多台 | Assumed office by 4 May | Peking |
| Mongolia | Nayant | Assumed office by 4 May; resigned on 8 Jul | Peking |
| Mongolia | Amurlingkui | Assumed office on 29 Apr; resigned on 3 Feb 1913 | Peking |
| Mongolia | 德色賚托布 | Assumed office on 27 Jun | Peking |
| Mongolia | 葉顯揚 | Assumed office on 16 Aug | Peking |
| Mongolia | Gungsangnorbu | ? | Peking |
| Mongolia | Gonchigsuren | ? | Peking |
| Mongolia | 張樹桐 | Assumed office after approved by senate on 14 Oct to succeed Gungsangnorbu | Peking |
| Mongolia | 永昌 (民國) | Assumed office after approved by senate on 14 Oct to succeed Gonchigsuren | Peking |

== Speaker ==
The Speaker and the Deputy Speaker were elected amongst the senators. The whole house of Nanking senate also elected the Presiding Officer (審議長) on 5 February.

| | Portrait | Name | Term of office | | Session |
|---|---|---|---|---|---|
| Speaker | | Lin Sen | 28 January 1912 | 8 April 1912 | Nanking |
| Speaker | | Wu Ching-lien | 29 April 1912 | 8 April 1913 | Peking |
| Deputy Speaker | | Chen Taoyi | 28 January 1912 | ? (resigned) | Nanking |
| Deputy Speaker | | Wang Chengting | 15 March 1912 | 8 April 1912 | Nanking |
| Deputy Speaker | | Tang Hualong | 29 April 1912 | 8 April 1913 | Peking |
| Presiding Officer | | Li Zhaofu | 5 February 1912 | 8 April 1912 | Nanking |

== Committees ==
In Nanking various committees were formed.

- Foreign Affairs Review Committee (外交審查會), chairman not elected
- Petitions Review Committee (請願審查會), chairman not elected
- Bills Review Committee (法律審查會), chaired by Wang Chengting
- Finance Review Committee (財政審查會), chaired by Pan Zuyi

In Peking six committees were formed.

- Whole House Committee (全院委員會), chaired by Ku Chung-hsin
- Legal System Committee (法制委員會), chaired by Chang Yao-tseng
- Finance Committee (財政委員會), chaired by Yin Ruli
- Home Affairs Committee (庶政委員會), chaired by Zheng Wanzhan
- Petitions Committee (請願委員會), chaired by Tseng Yen
- Reprimand Committee (懲罰委員會), chaired by Peng Zhanyuan

== Reincarnation ==
Another Provisional Senate was set up between 10 November 1917 and 12 August 1918. It was established after the dissolution of the first National Assembly in June 1917 and in the aftermath of the failed Manchu Restoration, with an election held on 14 November. Wang I-tang was the speaker and deputised by Nayant. It dissolved as the second National Assembly was founded. There were a total of 113 senators. Some of whom had served in the Nanking or Peking Senate.
