= National Assembly (Beiyang government) =

Parliament of the Beiyang government

National Assembly 國會
- National emblem of the Republic of China

Type
- Type: Bicameral
- Houses: Senate; House of Representative

History
- Founded: 8 April 1913; 113 years ago
- Disbanded: 1 July 1925; 101 years ago
- Preceded by: Provisional Senate (1913)
- Succeeded by: Legislative Yuan (1928); National Assembly (1947)

Structure
- Seats: Senate: 274; House of Representative: 596 Senate: 168; House of Representative: 406
- Length of term: Senate: 6 years House of Representative: 3 years

Elections
- First general election: December 1912–January 1913
- Last general election: May–June 1918

Meeting place
- National Assembly Building, Peking

Constitution
- Provisional Constitution of the Republic of China

National Assembly
- Traditional Chinese: 國會
- Simplified Chinese: 国会
Transcriptions
Standard Mandarin
- Hanyu Pinyin: Guóhuì
- Wade–Giles: Kuo²-hui⁴

The National Assembly (Chinese: 國會) was the legislative branch of the Beiyang government during the Republican era of Chinese history. The National Assembly was first founded in 1913, following the overthrow of the previous Qing dynasty, as the first free democratic legislature in Chinese history. It was disbanded less than a year later as President Yuan Shikai assumed dictatorial power and declared himself the Emperor of China. During the Warlord Era, the National Assembly was resurrected and disbanded more than once as different warlords vied for power and legitimacy.

In 1925, the National Assembly, was dissolved by Duan Qirui as a result of the 1924 Beijing Coup and replaced by the Provisional Government led by Duan, Feng Yuxiang, responsible for the coup and Manchurian warlord Zhang Zuolin. The Beiyang Government ceased to exist in 1928 as a result of the success of Chiang Kai-Shek's Northern Expedition, replacing it by the Nationalist Government.

== History ==
=== Early Chinese parliament ===
Calls for a National Assembly were part of the platform of the revolutionaries who ultimately overthrew the Qing dynasty. In response, the Qing dynasty formed the first assembly in 1910, but it was virtually powerless and intended only as an advisory body.

=== Founding of the Chinese Republic ===
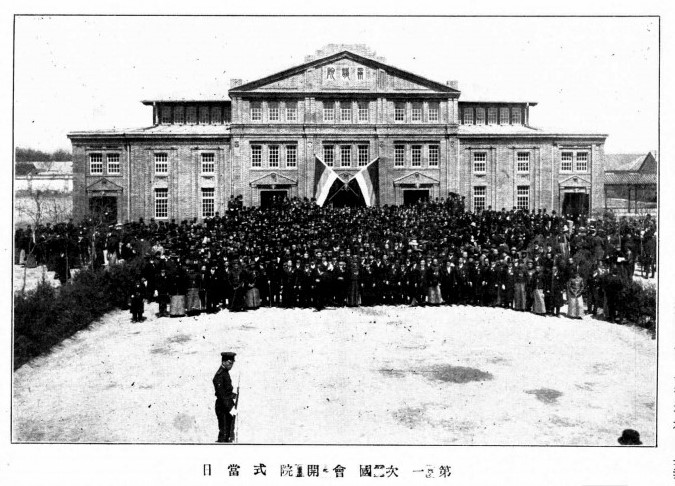
The opening of the first regular session of the National Assembly starting April 8, 1913

After the Xinhai Revolution, Provisional Senate was formed before national elections yielded the bicameral 1913 National Assembly, but significantly less than one percent voted due to gender, property, tax, residential, and literacy requirements. It was not a single nationwide election but a series of local elections that began in December 1912 with most concluding in January 1913. The poll was indirect, as voters chose electors who picked the delegates, in some cases leading to instances of bribery. The Senate was elected by the provincial assemblies. The president had to pick the 64 members representing Tibet, Outer Mongolia, and Overseas Chinese for practical reasons. However, these elections had the participation of over 300 civic groups and were the most competitive nationwide elections in Chinese history.

The election results gave a clear plurality for the Kuomintang, which won 392 of the 870 seats, but there was confusion as many candidates were members in several parties concurrently. Several switched parties after the election, giving the Kuomintang 438 seats. By order of seats, the Republican, Unity, and Democratic (formerly Constitutionalist) parties later merged into the Progressive Party under Liang Qichao.

Kuomintang leader Song Jiaoren was expected to become premier, but he was assassinated on March 20. An investigation linked the crime to Premier Zhao Bingjun and possibly the provisional president, Yuan Shikai. The assembly convened for the first time on April 8 amid heated debate over the assassination. The Kuomintang was divided over solutions on how to deal with Yuan. Sun Yat-sen led a faction to rebel against Yuan on July 12 but was completely defeated within two months. The National Assembly members were compromised by threats and bribes from Yuan. He confined them and forced them to elect him formal president. Next, he outlawed the Kuomintang and expelled them from the assembly. Without a quorum, it could not convene, so Yuan disbanded it on 10 January 1914.

=== Warlord Era ===
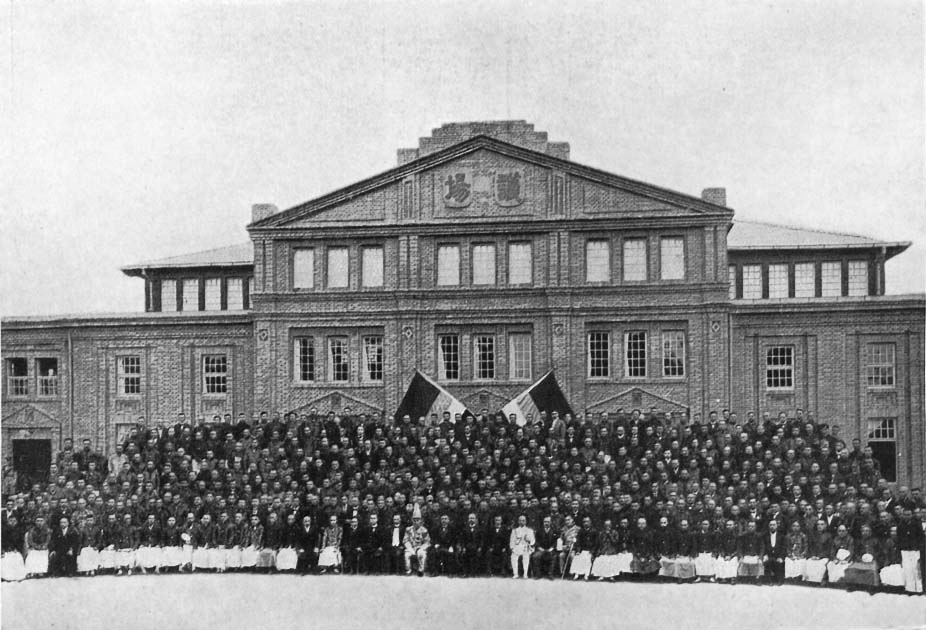
The reopening of the National Assembly on August 1, 1916, following the National Protection War, which overthrew Yuan Shikai's empire.

After Yuan died, the National Assembly reconvened on 1 August 1916 under the pretext that its three-year term had been suspended and had not expired, but President Li Yuanhong was forced to disband it due to the Manchu Restoration on 1 June 1917. 130 members (mostly Kuomintang) moved to Guangzhou where they held an "extraordinary session" on 25 August under a rival government led by Sun Yat-sen, and another 120 quickly followed. After the Old Guangxi clique became disruptive, the assembly temporarily moved to Kunming and later Chongqing under Tang Jiyao's protection until Guangzhou was liberated. Lacking a quorum, they selected new members in 1919.

In the Beiyang government, Premier Duan Qirui initiated elections for a new assembly. Seventeen provinces responded, five southern provinces boycotted, and the delegates for Tibet, Xinjiang, and Qinghai were chosen by Beijing. Votes were bought and sold in an open market with prices fluctuating constantly, and fraud and abuse was widespread. Duan dominated this assembly with his Anhui clique's political wing, the Anfu Club, which won 342 of the 470 seats, with the rest going to Liang Shiyi's Communications Clique, Liang Qichao's Research Clique or to independents. It met on 12 August 1918 to elect Xu Shichang to the presidency. This assembly met until 30 August 1920 when the Anhui clique was defeated by the Zhili clique in the Zhili–Anhui War. Xu held national elections in 1921 but only eleven provinces responded so that assembly never convened.

In 1922, Li Yuanhong was brought back to the Beijing presidency, and he recalled the 1913 assembly without the 1919 "extraordinary" additions, under the same pretext that its three years are not finished. Because Sun's Guangzhou regime was in disarray due to Chen Jiongming's rebellion, most members returned to Beijing for its August 1 session. The assembly was thoroughly discredited when it elected Cao Kun president after being bribed in 1923. To cover its shame, the assembly hastily finished the constitution it was working on for a decade. It was finally dissolved after Feng Yuxiang's coup on 24 November 1924. This assembly's three-year term was spread out over eleven years and was marked by corruption, factionalism, absences, and endless debate.

== Elections and terms ==
Term	Election	Senate seats	House seats	Total seats
1st	1912 Chinese National Assembly election	274	596	870
2nd	1918 Chinese National Assembly election	168	406	574

Timeline of National Assembly terms

== Sessions ==
Term	Session	Date	Meeting Place	Notes
1st	1st	Apr 8, 1913 － Jan 10, 1914	Beijing	1913 presidential election (Yuan Shikai, Li Yuanhong); President Yuan Shikai then dissolved the National Assembly to plan for his Empire of China
1st	2nd	Aug 1, 1916 － June 12, 1917	Beijing	Resumed after the death of Yuan Shikai and dissolution of the Empire of China; 1916 vice-presidential election (Feng Guozhang); President Li Yuanhong dissolved the National Assembly under Zhang Xun's push for Manchu Restoration
1st	interim	Aug 25, 1917 － Jun 1922	Guangzhou	Premier Duan Qirui refused to restore the National Assembly and pushed for re-election Members who supported Sun Yat-sen's Constitutional Protection Movement held session in Guangzhou
2nd	regular	Aug 12, 1918 － August 30, 1920	Beijing	Re-election under Premier Duan Qirui's administration 1918 presidential election (Xu Shichang); President Xu Shichang dissolved the National Assembly after First Zhili–Fengtian War
1st (resumed)	3rd	Aug 1, 1922 － Dec 13, 1924	Beijing	Supporters of Constitutional Restoration took over Beijing after First Zhili–Fengtian War; 1923 presidential election (Cao Kun); Duan Qirui returned as the Premier after Second Zhili–Fengtian War
1st (resumed)	interim	Nov 22, 1924 － Apr 24, 1925	Beijing	Dissolved by Premier Duan Qirui

== Historical Site ==
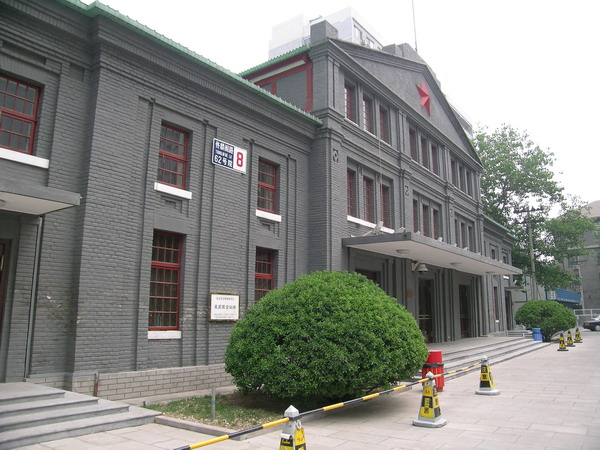
The National Assembly Building in Beijing

The meeting place of the House of Representative is located in today's Xicheng District of Beijing. The building is protected by the People's Government of Beijing Municipality as a historical site.

== See also ==
- National Assembly Building (Beijing)
- United States Congress
- United States Electoral College
- National Assembly (Republic of China)
- National People's Congress
