= Unity Party (China) =

Unity Party 統一黨
- Directors: Zhang Binglin; Cheng Dequan; Zhang Jian; Xiong Xiling
- Founded: 2 March 1912
- Dissolved: 29 May 1913
- Merger of: Chinese Republican United Association; Preliminary Constitutional Consortia
- Merged into: Progressive Party
- Ideology: Conservatism (Chinese); Statism; Unitarism
- Political position: Right-wing

The Unity Party (Chinese: 統一黨) was a short-lived political party in the early of the Republican period of China from 1912 to 1913.

== History ==
The Unity Party was formed in Shanghai on 2 March 1912, as the merger of Zhang Binglin's Chinese Republican United Association (中華民國聯合會) and Zhang Jian's Preliminary Constitutional Consortia (預備立憲公會), as well as former officials and local gentries.

As a former Tongmenghui member and leader of the Guangfuhui, Zhang Binglin set up the Chinese Republican United Association in early 1912 to participate in new Republican politics. Zhang Jian was a major figure of the Constitutional Movement in the late Qing period, he and Zhang Binglin wanted to form a grand coalition to counter the radical Tongmenghui in the Nanjing Provisional Government.

The Unity Party was formed with Zhang Binglin, Cheng Dequan, Zhang Jian, and Xiong Xiling as heads. Other notable founding members included Tang Soqian, Tang Shaoyi and Tang Hualong. The Unity Party also held many ministry offices in the provisional government, such as Zhang Jian as the Minister of Commerce, Cheng Dequan as the Minister of Internal Affairs, and Tang Soqian as the Minister of Communications. In late April 1912, the party moved its headquarters to Beijing with the provisional government.

The Unity Party was one of the targets the Yuan Shikai's government wanted to ally with. Besides funding the party, Zhang Binglin was invited as Yuan's adviser and Cheng Dequan was appointed as Governor of Jiangsu when the Provisional Senate was opened. Unity Party's Wu Jinglian was also elected as the Speaker to replace Tongmenghui's Lin Sen.

Under the guide of Yuan Shikai and Liang Qichao, the Unity Party, Democratic Party and Republican Party merged into the Progressive Party on 29 May 1913. The Progressive Party became the flagship pro-Yuan party in the National Assembly.

== See also ==
- List of political parties in the Republic of China
- 1912 Republic of China National Assembly elections

== Bibliography ==
- Zhang, Yufa (1985). 民國初年的政黨 [Minguo chu nian de zheng dang]. Institute of Modern History, Academia Sinica.
