= Politics of China (disambiguation) =

Politics of China is the politics of the People's Republic of China, a single-party socialist state.

Politics of China may also refer to

- Politics of Taiwan, officially known as the Republic of China
- Politics of the special administrative regions of the People's Republic of China

- Politics of Hong Kong
- Politics of Macau

- Political systems of Imperial China from 221 BC to 1912 AD

== See also ==
- Cross-Strait relations
- History of political parties in China
