= 1916 Chinese vice presidential election =

1916 Chinese vice-presidential election
- 30 October 1916
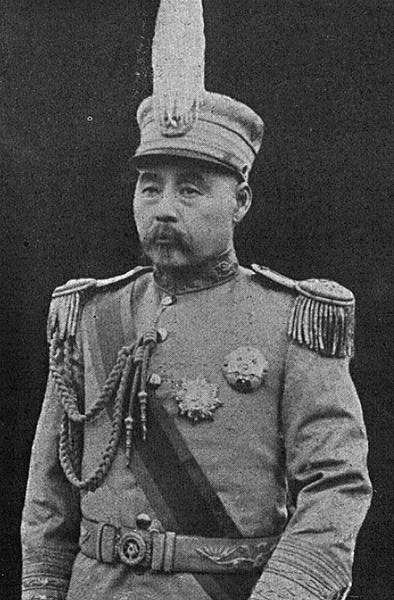

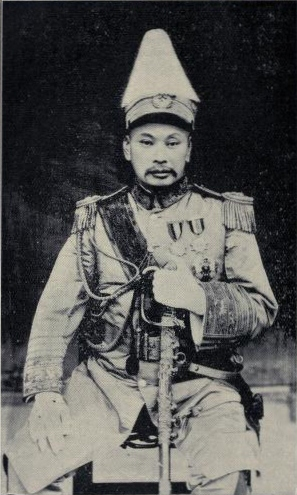
Nominee	Feng Guozhang	Lu Rongting
Party	Zhili Clique	Old Guangxi Clique
Electoral vote	520	201
Percentage	72.12%	27.88%
Vice-President before election
Li Yuanhong
Progressive Party of China
Elected Vice-President
Feng Guozhang
Zhili Clique

The 1916 Chinese vice presidential by-election were a by-election held on 30 October 1916 in Beijing for the Vice President of China due to the vacancy left by incumbent Li Yuanhong as he replaced Yuan Shikai as president after Yuan's sudden death. Feng Guozhang of the Zhili clique won over Lu Rongting of the Old Guangxi Clique in the election.

== Results ==
Candidate	First round		Second round		Third round	
Candidate	Votes	%	Votes	%	Votes	%
Feng Guozhang	413	57.36	528		520	72.12
Lu Rongting	179	24.86	180		201	27.88
Huang Xing	33	4.58	6			
Tang Jiyao	25	3.47				
Cen Chunxuan	19	2.64	2–3			
Xu Shichang	15	2.08				
Duan Qirui	6	0.83				
Tan Renfeng	6	0.83				
Cai E	5	0.69	2–3			
Gungsangnorbu	5	0.69				
Liang Qichao	4	0.56				
Li Liejun	3	0.42				
Zhang Zuolin	1	0.14				
Zhang Xun	1	0.14				
Zhang Binglin	1	0.14				
Cai Yuanpei	1	0.14				
Liu Guansan	1	0.14				
Li Can	1	0.14				
Others	1	0.14				
Total	702	100.00	718–720	100.00	721	100.00

== See also ==
- History of Republic of China
- Vice President of the Republic of China
- 1912 Chinese National Assembly election
