= 1912 Chinese provisional presidential election =

1912 Chinese provisional presidential elections
← 1911	15 & 20 February 1912	1913 →
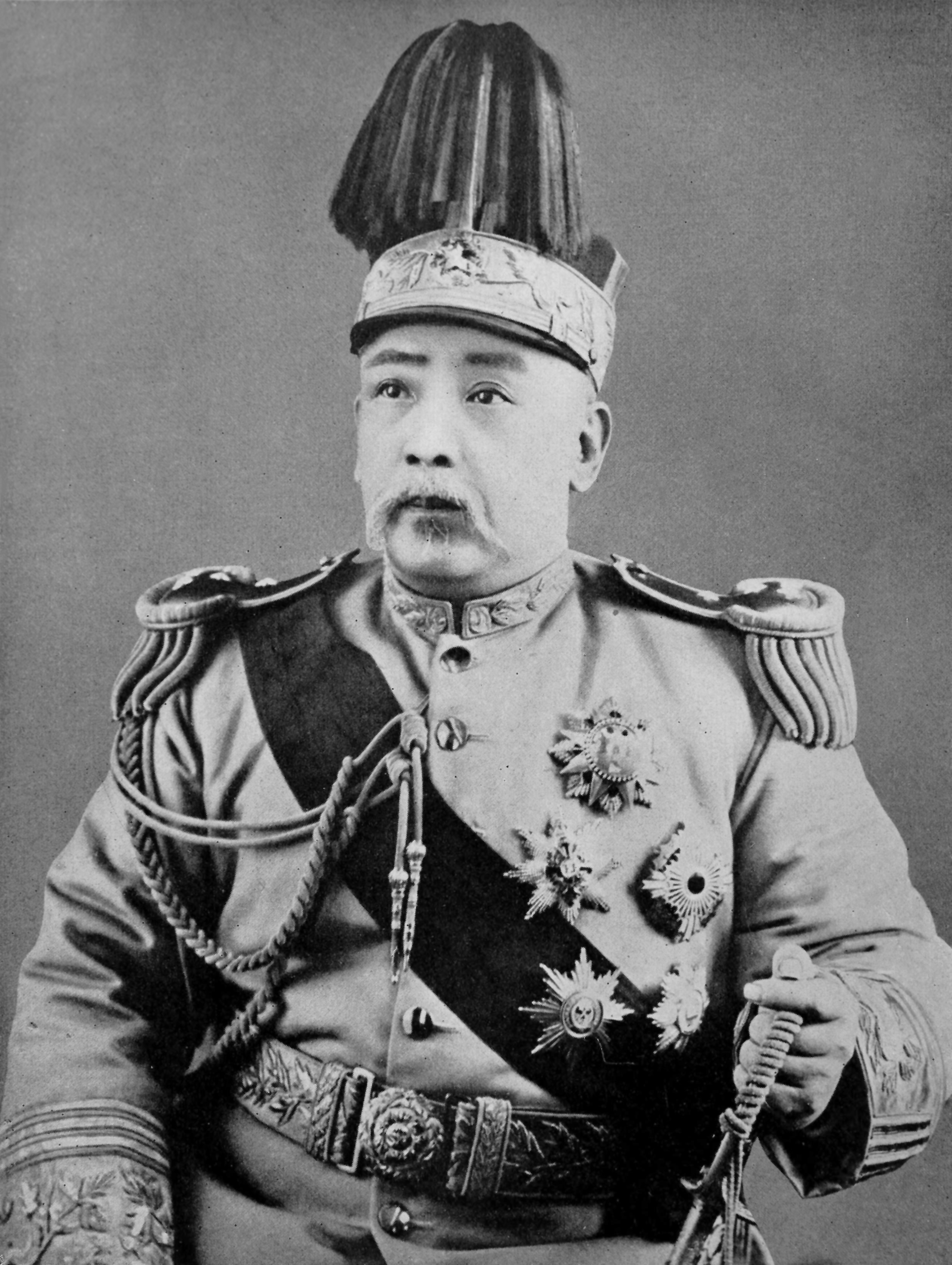
Nominee	Yuan Shikai
Party	Independent
Electoral vote	17
Percentage	100%
President before election
Sun Yat-sen
Tongmenghui
Elected President
Yuan Shikai
Independent

The 1912 Chinese provisional presidential election were the elections held on 15 February and 20 February 1912 in Nanjing for the second provisional President and Vice President of China.

After the Wuchang Uprising on 10 October 1911, Yuan Shikai, the powerful military officer was reappointed to lead the Beiyang Army by the Qing court. Yuan realized that Manchu's days were numbered and decided to establish a government himself. He attacked the revolutionaries to show his power, however left the negotiations open. After the revolutionaries promised him the presidency, he pressed the Qing court to abdicate. On 12 February 1912, the court authorized Yuan to organize a provisional republican government. Three days later, the incumbent provisional president Sun Yat-sen resigned and urged the National Assembly to elect Yuan.

Yuan Shikai and Li Yuan-hung were elected as president and vice-president respectively. Yuan sworn in on 10 March 1912 and moved to government to Beijing.

== Results ==
=== President ===
Candidate	Party	Votes	%
Yuan Shikai	Independent	17	100.00
Total		17	100.00

=== Vice-President ===
Candidate	Party	Votes	%
Li Yuanhong	Independent	17	100.00
Total		17	100.00

== See also ==
- History of Republic of China
- President of the Republic of China
- Vice President of the Republic of China
