= 1913 Chinese presidential election =

← 1912	6 and 7 October 1913	1918 →
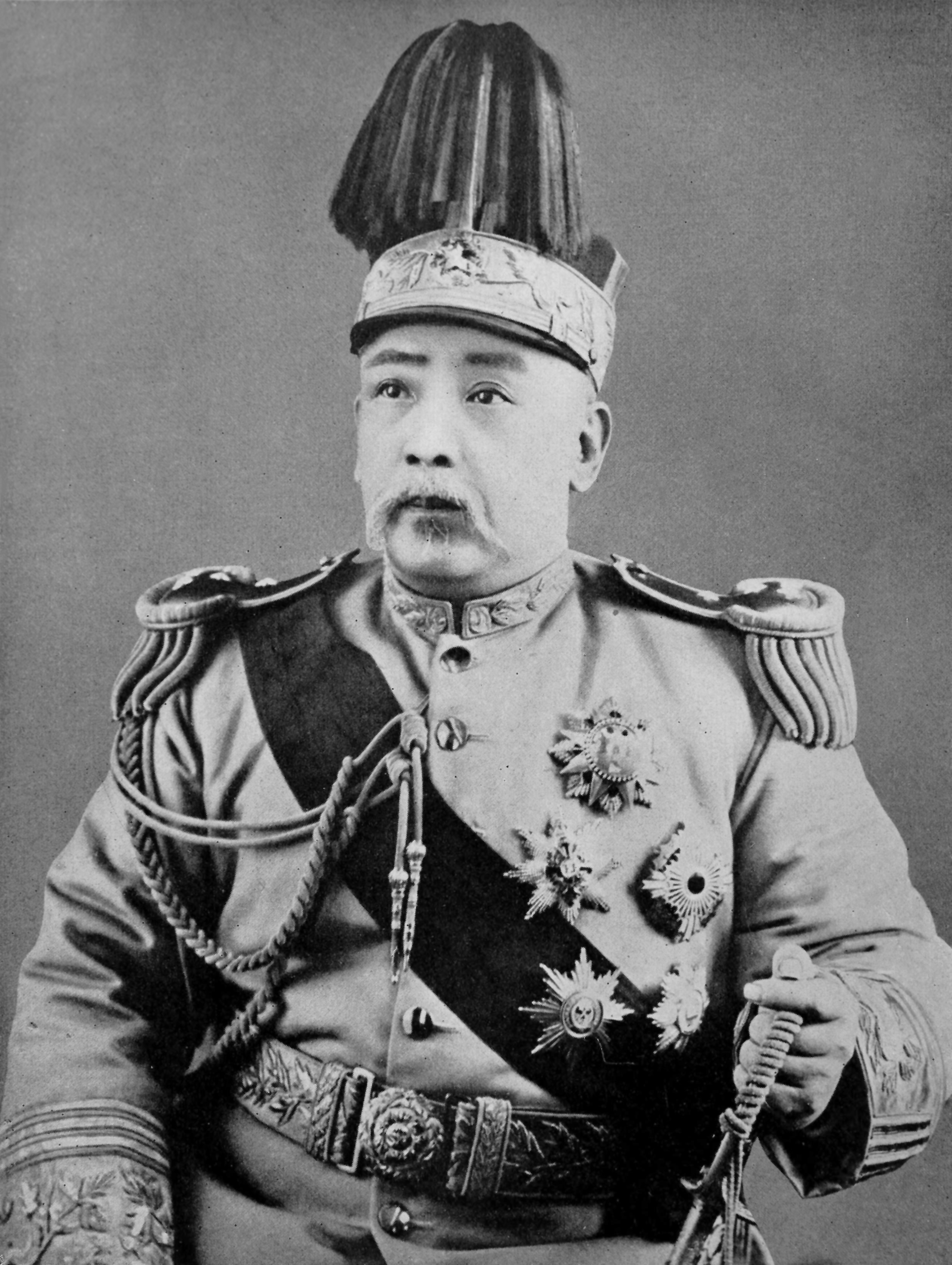
Nominee	Yuan Shikai
Party	Independent
Electoral vote	500
Percentage	71.12%
President before election
Yuan Shikai
Independent
Elected President
Yuan Shikai
Independent

The 1913 Chinese presidential election were the election held on 6 and 7 October 1913 in Beijing for the first formal President and Vice President of China. The incumbent Yuan Shikai and Li Yuanhong were elected by two houses of the National Assembly.

== Results ==
=== President ===
Candidate	Party	Votes	%
Yuan Shikai	Independent	500	71.12
Others		203	28.88
Total		703	100.00

=== Vice-President ===
Candidate	Party	Votes	%
Li Yuanhong	Independent	601	83.59
Others		118	16.41
Total		719	100.00

== See also ==
- History of Republic of China
- President of the Republic of China
- Vice President of the Republic of China
- 1912 Chinese National Assembly election
