= Tang Xiangming =

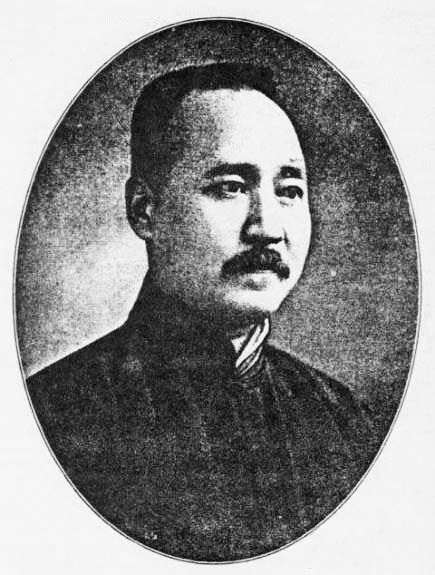
- Born: 1885 Hubei, Qing Empire
- Died: 1975 (aged 89–90) Beijing, China
- Allegiance: Qing dynasty Republic of China; Empire of China; People's Republic of China
- Battles / wars: Wuchang Uprising
- Awards: Order of Rank and Merit; Order of Wen-Hu

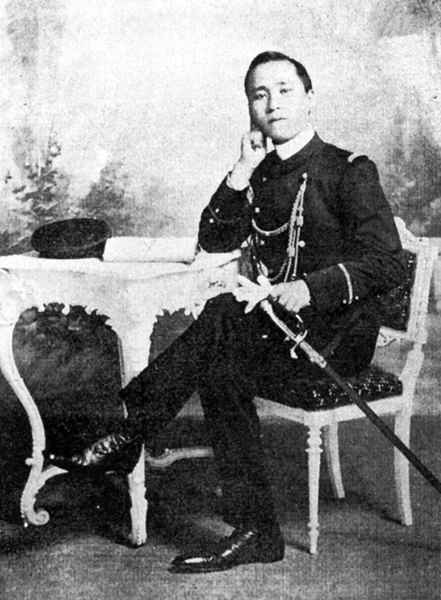
Tang Xiangming in Navy uniform during the Qing dynasty

Tang Xiangming (simplified Chinese: 汤芗铭; traditional Chinese: 湯薌銘; 1885–1975), courtesy name Zhuxin (铸新), was a Chinese naval officer. Tang studied Naval warfare in France and the United Kingdom. In 1905, he joined the Chinese United League (Tongmenghui). In 1911, during the Wuchang Uprising, Tang, under the command of Admiral Sa Zhenbing, sailed to Hankou as part of the Qing Navy's assistance to the Qing Army operations in the area. In 1912, he was appointed Deputy-Minister of the Navy during China's Provisional Government. In December 1915, he supported Yuan Shikai's creation of the Empire of China (1915–1916). After Yuan's death, he supported the Zhili clique until their defeat by the Fengtian clique in the Second Zhili–Fengtian War in 1924. In 1930, he supported Shanxi warlord Yan Xishan in opposing Chiang Kai-shek. In 1933, he became a member of the China Democratic Socialist Party. During the Second Sino-Japanese War, he went to Chongqing. After the end of the Chinese Civil War, he stayed on the mainland and died in Beijing at the age of 90. He was the younger brother of Tang Hualong.
