= 1918 Chinese National Assembly election =

1918 Chinese National Assembly elections
- May − June 1918

574 seats to the National Assembly (168 seats to the Senate + 406 seats to the House of Representatives)
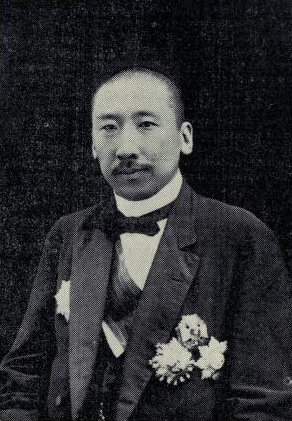

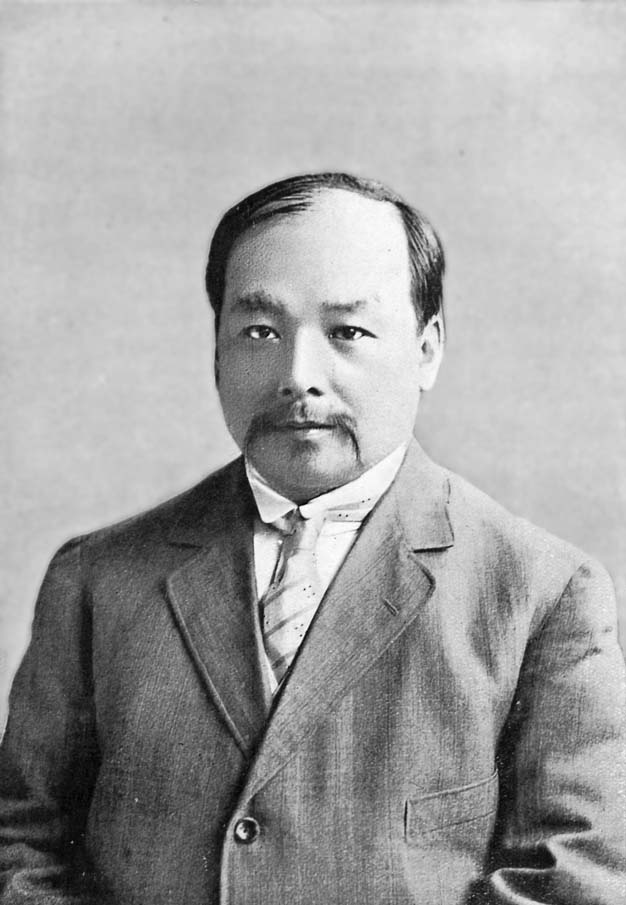

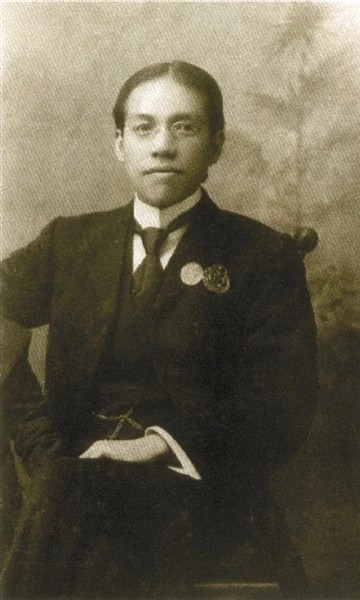
	First party	Second party	Third party
Leader	Wang Yitang	Liang Shiyi	Liang Qichao
Party	Anfu Club	Communications Clique	Research Clique
Seats won	342	≈50-80	≈20

The 1918 Chinese National Assembly elections, held in May to June, were the elections for the second National Assembly. The bicameral assembly consisted of a senate and a house of representatives. Representatives were directly elected while senators were elected by provincial assemblies.

The first National Assembly elected in 1912 was dismissed by President Yuan Shikai in 1914 followed by the proclamation of emperor himself. After Yuan died, Vice President Li Yuanhong succeeded the office and reconvened the National Assembly on 1 August 1916 under the pretext that its three-year term was suspended not expired. Li Yuanhong was forced to disband it due to the Manchu Restoration on 13 June 1917. Duan Qirui, the former Premier dismissed by his rival Li Yuanhong and the head of Anhui clique defeated the Restoration armies in Beijing and resumed his post as Premier, which made him the most powerful leader in China.

Duan Qirui initiated elections for a new assembly to consolidate his power. Seventeen provinces responded, five southern provinces under the Southern militant governments (Guangdong, Guangxi, Guizhou, Yunnan, and Sichuan) boycotted, and the delegates for Tibet, Xinjiang, and Qinghai were chosen by Beijing. While there were 574 seats available, the southern boycott left 104 seats vacant leading to the actual total of 470. Votes were bought and sold in an open market with prices fluctuating constantly and fraud and abuse was widespread. Duan dominated this assembly with his Anhui clique's political wing, the Anfu Club, which won 342 of the 470 seats with the rest going to Liang Shiyi's Communications Clique, Liang Qichao's Research Clique or to independents. Only 98, about one-fifth, of those elected had prior legislative experience.

It met on 12 August 1918 to elect Xu Shichang to the presidency in the 1918 presidential election. Though the Anfu Club promised the vice-presidency to Cao Kun, the Communications clique prevented the two-thirds quorum required for his election and left the office vacant. This assembly met until 30 August 1920 when the Anhui clique was defeated by the Zhili clique in the Zhili–Anhui War. Xu held national elections in 1921 but only eleven provinces responded so that assembly never convened.

After Duan dismissed the old assembly, 130 members (mostly Kuomintang) moved to Guangzhou where they held an "extraordinary session" on 25 August under a rival government led by Sun Yat-sen, another 120 quickly followed. After the Old Guangxi clique became disruptive, the assembly temporarily moved to Kunming and later Chongqing under Tang Jiyao's protection until Guangzhou was liberated. Lacking a quorum, they selected new members in 1919.

== See also ==
- History of the Republic of China
- National Assembly (Beiyang government)
- National Assembly (Republic of China)
- Beiyang government
- Warlord Era
- Anhui clique
