= Republican Party (China) =

Republican Party 共和黨
- Chairman: Li Yuanhong
- Founded: 9 May 1912
- Dissolved: 29 May 1913
- Merger of: National Progressive Association; People's Association; Unity Party; Civil Conference Board; Consortia of the Republic of China
- Merged into: Progressive Party
- Ideology: Conservatism (Chinese); Chinese nationalism; Unitarism; Statism; Republicanism
- Political position: Right-wing

The Republican Party (simplified Chinese: 共和党; traditional Chinese: 共和黨; pinyin: gònghédǎng; Wade–Giles: Kung-ho-tang) was a short-lived political party in the Republican era of China from 1912 to 1913.

== History ==
The party was formed on 9 May 1912 in Shanghai by political groups who opposed to the Tongmenghui, and later the Nationalist Party (Kuomintang). These included the People's Association (民社), formed by mostly Hubei natives (including Li Yuanhong, Tan Yankai and Wang Zhengting) in January 1912, the Unity Party, and the National Progressive Association (國民共進會) which had been organized by supporters of Yuan Shikai in March 1912. The party included many politicians who had formerly served as officials under the deposed Qing dynasty.

The party's most important figures were Li Yuanhong, Zhang Jian, and Wu Tingfang. On the establishment day, Zhang Jian chaired as the provisional chairman. Li Yuanhong, Zhang Jian, Zhang Binglin, Wu Tingfang, and Borjigit were elected the first directors (理事). After its headquarters was moved to Beijing, Li Yuanhong was elected chairman at the general meeting. As the Republican Party supported President Yuan Shikai, he aided it in gaining a substantial number of seats in the Beijing Provisional Government's first, unelected senate and the new provincial assemblies. This resulted in a stalemate between the Kuomintang and the Republican Party, weakening the provisional senate and strengthening President Yuan's own position.

Following fierce debates between the parties and much stalling, the provisional senate finally passed a number of bills which allowed for the first National Assembly election to take place in December 1912. In this election, the Republicans became the second largest party in the National Assembly behind the Kuomintang, winning 120 seats in the house and 55 in the senate.

The Republican, Unity, and Democratic (formerly Constitutionalist) parties later merged into the Progressive Party under Liang Qichao in order to balance the dominance of the Kuomintang in the assembly.

== Ideology ==
The party's ideology was based on Jean-Jacques Rousseau's The Social Contract, and its aims were to "uphold the united, republican politics with progressivism in order to achieve well-beings of the countrymen." It thus advocated a strong central government with great powers to ensure the unity and future progress of China. The party also supported a peaceful foreign policy.

== See also ==
- List of political parties in the Republic of China
