= Democratic Party (1912) =

Political party in the Republic of China (1912–1913)

Democratic Party 民主黨
- Chairman: Tang Hualong (first); Liang Qichao (last)
- Founded: 27 September 1912
- Dissolved: 29 May 1913
- Merged into: Progressive Party
- Ideology: Liberalism (Chinese); Conservative liberalism Constitutional monarchism Unitarism
- Political position: Centre-right

The Democratic Party (Chinese: 民主黨) was a short-lived liberal political party in the early Republican period of China from 1912 to 1913.

== History ==
It was formed by several groups of politicians of the late Qing Constitutional Movement on 27 September 1912 in Beijing after seeing the Nationalist Party (Kuomintang) and Republican emerged in the Provisional Senate of the Provisional Republican Government. Tang Hualong became the first Chairman of the party while Liang Qichao was the actual head. The radical faction split from the party after the party stood with the government's stance on the Russo-Mongolian Agreement on 3 November 1912.

Under Liang Qichao, the Democratic Party, Unity Party, and Republican Party merged into the Progressive Party on 29 May 1913. The Progressive Party became the flagship pro-Yuan party in the National Assembly.

== See also ==
- List of political parties in the Republic of China
- 1912 Republic of China National Assembly elections
