= 1923 Chinese presidential election =

- 5 October 1923
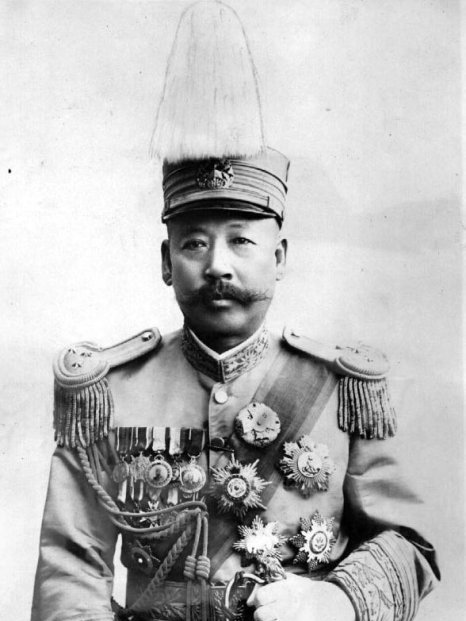

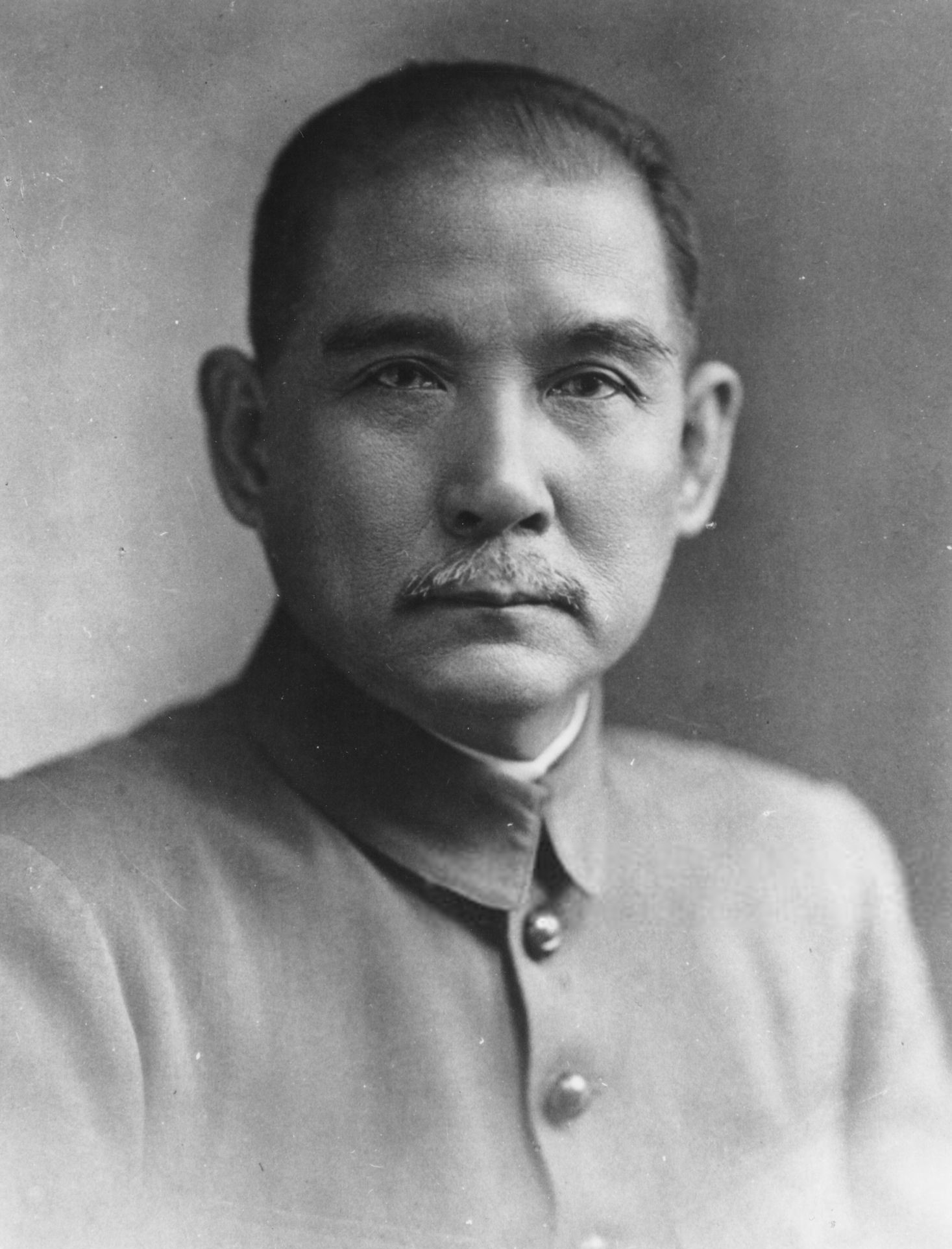
Nominee	Cao Kun	Sun Yat-sen
Party	Zhili clique	KMT
Electoral vote	480	33
Percentage	81.36%	6.88%
President before election
Gao Lingwei (acting)
Nonpartisan
Elected President
Cao Kun
Zhili clique

The 1923 Chinese presidential election was the election held on 5 October 1923 in Beijing for the third term of the President of China. Warlord Cao Kun of the Zhili clique won the election through bribery.

The capital was under control of the Zhili Clique after the Zhili–Anhui War. In 1922 the Zhili warlords Wu Peifu and Cao Kun restored the "old" parliament elected in 1912. Cao bribed the congressmen to elect him President, personally paying members 5,000 yuan each starting on the 1st of October. This was done in the name of payment of arrears, as members had not been paid regularly for some time. On October 3, Representative Shao Ruipeng of Zhejiang Province took photos of the checks given to members and reported it to the Beijing prosecutor's office. On October 5, Cao received a large majority of the votes cast. There were 12 spoiled ballots, such as one for bandit Sun Meiyao, who was responsible for the Lincheng Outrage. There was also a ballot cast for "5,000 yuan".

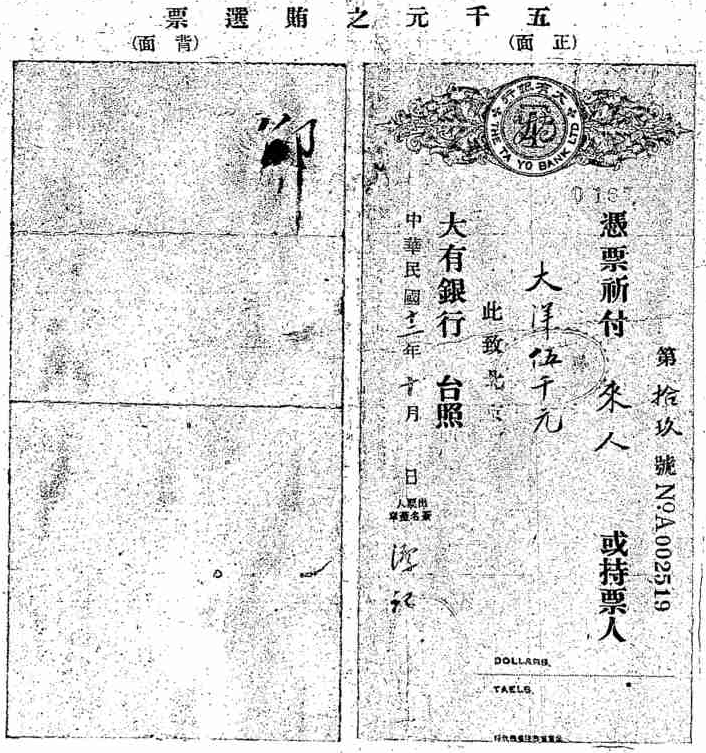
The 5,000-Yuan cheque

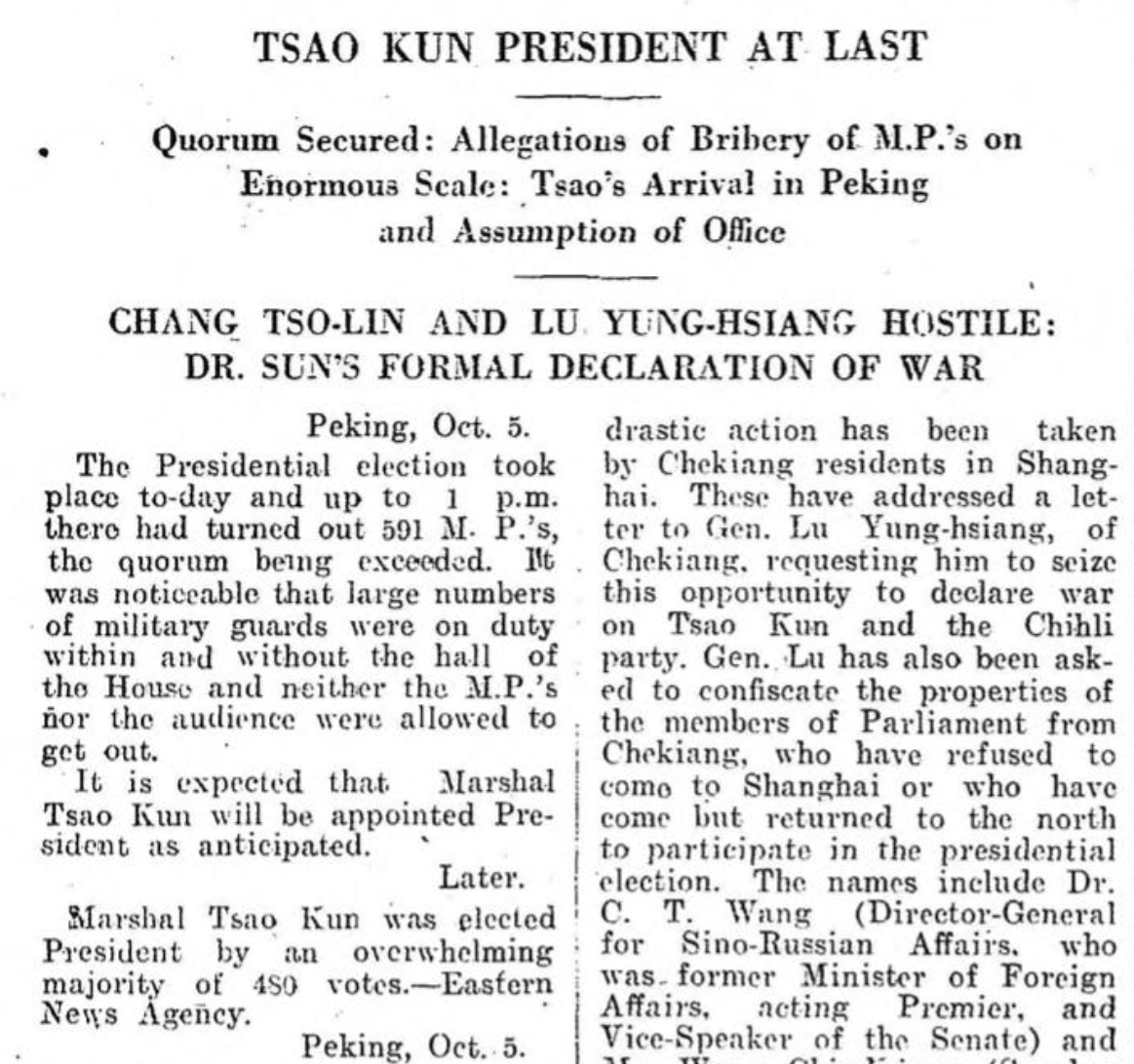
Report by North China Daily News related to Cao Kun's election to president and controversy

The bribery scandal led to the collapse of Cao's presidency and dismissal of the parliament on 24 November 1924, after the Cao's defeat in the Second Zhili–Fengtian War in 1924, and Duan Qirui, the leader of the Anhui clique, would again lead the government in Beijing.

This was the last presidential election to be held in China until 1948, in the midst of the final stages of the Chinese Civil War.

== Results ==
=== President ===
Candidate	Party	Votes	%
Cao Kun	Zhili clique	480	83.04
Sun Yat-sen	Kuomintang	33	5.71
Tang Jiyao	Yunnan clique	20	3.46
Cen Chunxuan	Kuomintang	8	1.38
Duan Qirui	Anhui clique	7	1.21
Wu Peifu	Zhili clique	5	0.87
Other candidates		25	4.33
Total		578	100.00
Valid votes		578	97.97
Invalid/blank votes		12	2.03
Total votes		590	100.00

== See also ==
- Beiyang government
- History of the Republic of China
- President of the Republic of China
- 1912 Chinese National Assembly election
- Zhili clique
