= Zhang Binglin =

Chinese linguist (1868–1936)

- 章炳麟
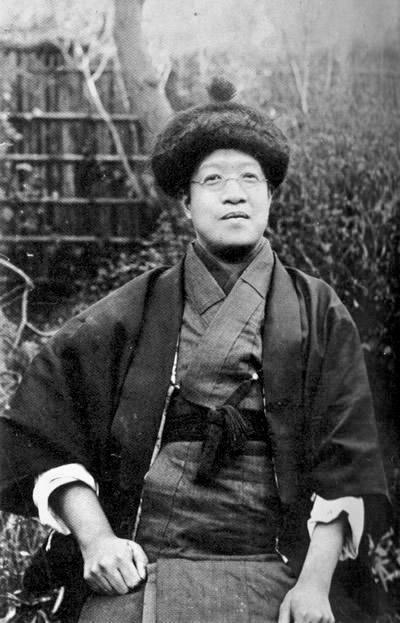
- Zhang Binglin c. 1900
- Born: 12 January 1869; Yuhang, Zhejiang, Qing Empire
- Died: 14 June 1936 (aged 67); Suzhou, Jiangsu, Republic of China
- Political party: Tongmenghui; Unity Party; Republican Party; Progressive Party
- Spouse: Tang Guoli
- Children: Zhang Dao (章導); Zhang Qi (章奇); Zhang Li (章㸚); Zhang Chuo (章叕); Zhang Zhan (章㠭); Zhang Lei (章㗊)

Chinese name
- Chinese: 章炳麟
Transcriptions
Standard Mandarin
- Hanyu Pinyin: Zhāng Bǐnglín
- Wade–Giles: Chang^{1} Ping^{3}-lin^{2}
- IPA: [ʈʂáŋ pìŋlǐn]

Chinese name
- Chinese: 章太炎
Transcriptions
Standard Mandarin
- Hanyu Pinyin: Zhāng Tàiyán
- Wade–Giles: Chang^{1} Tai^{3}-Yen^{2}
- IPA: [ʈʂáŋ tʰâɪjɛ̌n]

Zhang Binglin (January 12, 1869 – June 14, 1936), also known by his art name Zhang Taiyan, was a Chinese philologist, textual critic, philosopher, and revolutionary.

His philological works include Chinese: 文始; pinyin: Wen Shi; trans. "The Origin of Writing", the first systematic work of Chinese etymology. He also made contributions to historical Chinese phonology, proposing that "the niang (娘) and ri (日) initials [in Middle Chinese] come from the ni (泥) initial [in Old Chinese]' (known as niang ri gui ni 娘日歸泥). He developed a system of shorthand based on the seal script, called jiyin zimu (記音字母), later adopted as the basis of zhuyin. Though innovative in many ways, he was skeptical of new archaeological findings, regarding the oracle bones as forgery.

An activist as well as a scholar, he produced many political works. Because of his outspoken character, he was jailed for three years by the Qing Empire and put under house arrest for another three by Yuan Shikai.

== Life ==
Zhang was born with the given name Xuecheng (學乘) in Yuhang (now a district in Hangzhou), Zhejiang to a scholarly family. In 1901, to demonstrate his hatred of the Manchu rulers of the Qing state, he changed his name to 'Taiyan' after two scholars who had resisted the Qing takeover 250 years before: 'Tai' came from Taichong, the pen name of Huang Zongxi, and 'Yan' from Gu Yanwu.

When he was 23, he began to study under the great philologist Yu Yue (1821–1907), immersing himself in the Chinese classics for seven years.

After the First Sino-Japanese War, he went to Shanghai, becoming a member of the Society for National Strengthening (強學會) and writing for a number of newspapers, including Liang Qichao's Shi Wu Bao (時務報). In September 1898, after the failure of the Wuxu Reform, Zhang escaped to Taiwan with the help of a Japanese friend and worked as a reporter for Taiwan Nichinichi Shimpō (臺灣日日新報) and wrote for The China Discussion (清議報) produced in Japan by Liang Qichao.

In May of the following year, Zhang went to Japan and was introduced to Sun Yat-sen by Liang Qichao. He returned to China two months later to be a reporter for the Shanghai-based Yadong Shibao (亞東時報). His most important political work, Qiu Shu (訄書) was published in 1900–1 and then in a substantially revised edition in 1904.

In 1901, under the threat of arrest from the Qing Empire, Zhang taught at Soochow University for a year before he escaped to Japan for several months. Upon return, he was arrested and jailed for three years until June 1906. He began to study the Buddhist scriptures during his time in jail.

After his release, Zhang went to Japan to join Tongmeng Hui and became the chief editor of the newspaper Min Bao (民報) which strongly criticized the Qing Empire's corruption. There, he also lectured on the Chinese classics and philology for overseas Chinese students. His students in Japan include Lu Xun, Zhou Zuoren and Qian Xuantong. His most important student was Huang Kan. In 1908, Min Bao was banned by the Japanese government. This caused Zhang to focus on his philological research. He coined the phrase "Zhonghua Minguo" (中華民國, literally "Chinese People's State") which became the Chinese name of the Republic of China.

Because of an ideological conflict with Sun Yat-sen and his Three Principles of the People, Zhang established the Tokyo branch of Guangfu Hui in February 1909.

After the Wuchang Uprising, Zhang returned to China to establish the Republic of China Alliance (中華民國聯合會) and chief-edit the Dagonghe Ribao (大共和日報).

After Yuan Shikai became the President of the Republic of China in 1913, Zhang was his high-ranking advisor for a few months until the assassination of Song Jiaoren. After criticizing Yuan for possible responsibility of the assassination, Zhang was put under house arrest, in Beijing's Longquan Temple, until Yuan's death in 1916. After release, Zhang was appointed Minister of the Guangzhou Generalissimo (大元帥府秘書長) in June 1917.

In 1924, Zhang left the Kuomintang, entitled himself a loyalist to the Republic of China, and became critical of Chiang Kai-shek. Zhang established the National Studies Society (國學講習會) in Suzhou in 1934 and chief-edited the magazine Zhi Yan (制言).

He died two years later at 67 and was buried in a state funeral. On April 3, 1955, the People's Republic of China moved his coffin from Suzhou to Nanping Mountain, Hangzhou. The People's Republic established a museum devoted to him beside the West Lake.

He had three daughters with his first wife. With Cai Yuanpei as witness, he married again in 1913, with Tang Guoli (湯國梨), an early Chinese feminist. They had two sons, Zhang Dao (章導) and Zhang Qi (章奇).

== Philosophical beginnings ==
Originally, Zhang Binglin was firmly rooted in "Old Text" philology, which emphasized "the diversity of China's intellectual heritage led to a serious erosion of the paramount position of Confucius as upheld by the unwavering guardians of orthodoxy". Zhang shared the views of his contemporary, Liu Yiqing, that the Confucian classics should be read as history, not sacred scripture. However, he firmly rejected Liu's suggestion to put Chinese intellectual heritage into the matrix of Western philosophy. Joachim Kurtz writes:

Zhang Binglin did not oppose radical reconceptualizations per se but only those that uncritically mirrored European taxonomies. Rather than squeezing ancient Chinese texts and concepts into a Western-derived disciplinary corset, Zhang suggested expanding existing categories in such a way as to make space for the new knowledge that the nation, as he readily agreed, so desperately needed.

Zhang replaced conventional sense of mingjia (which was the name of one of the nine philosophical schools pre-Qin) with a new understanding—the methodology of debate similar to European logic and Buddhist dialectic.

Zhang's thoughts on religion went through multiple phases. Originally, in his pre-imprisonment days, he was highly critical of religion, and wrote several essays that criticized religious concepts: "Looking at Heaven", "The Truth about Confucianism", and "On Bacteria". In these essays, he emphasized that the scientific world could be reconciled with classical Chinese philosophy. However, his thoughts on religion significantly changed following his imprisonment.

=== Imprisonment (1903–1906) ===
Zhang's interest and studies in Buddhism only became serious during the three years he spent in prison for "publishing anti-Manchu propaganda and insulting the Qing emperor as a 'buffoon' in 1903". During this time, he read the Yogacara-bhumi, the basic texts of Weishi "Consciousness Only" school, and the foundational work of Chinese Buddhist logic (the Nyayapravesa). These texts were given to him by members of the Chinese Society of Education (Zhongguo jiaoyuhui). He later claimed that "it was only through reciting and meditating on these sutras that he was able to get through his difficult jail experience". His experiences with Buddhist philosophical texts gave him a framework to reassess the significance of his pain and suffering and view it in a different light. In 1906, after he was released from prison, Zhang went to Japan to edit The People's Journal (Minbao) and developed a new philosophical framework that critiqued the dominant intellectual trend of modernization theory.

He emerged from jail as devout Yogacarin. His attitude towards religion—namely Buddhism—changed after his time spent in prison. This is made apparent in "Zhang Taiyan's Notes on Reading Buddhist Texts", in which he is concerned with the concepts of "freedom, constraints, sadness, and happiness". After 1906, Buddhist terms became more prevalent in his writing, especially in his interpretation of Zhuangzi's "Discourse on Making Things Equal".

=== Time in Japan (1906–1910) ===
Zhang was further exposed to Yogacara Buddhism during his time in Japan (1906–1910), when he was actively involved in nationalist, anti-Manchu politics. During his time there, he edited the Tokyo-based The People's Journal (Minbao), where he first expressed a "Buddhist voice". While he was in Japan, he joined Tong Meng Hui, a party that was primarily made up of anti-Manchu exiles (including Sun Yat-sen) seeking the cultural and political regeneration of China.

His 1907 text The Five Negations denounced how European economies "exhaust their own enterprises" and "extinguish the fertility of the land."

Upon his return to China, Zhang worked on the commission "convened by the new Nationalist government's Ministry of Education in 1913 to establish a national language and helped develop the Chinese phonetic symbol system still used today in Taiwan, among other places."

The terminology used by Zhang is not common in earlier Chinese philosophical discussions of symbol, language, and the sacred—before the 20th century, Chinese philosophical texts were in classical Chinese (wenyanwen), which uses monosyllabic style. The vernacular (baihua) began to be more commonly used after the May 4th Movement in 1919. Compound words like yuyen were rarely used in pre-20th-century Chinese writings. Zhang was exposed to these linguistic approaches during his time in Japan following his imprisonment.

== Yogacara and Zhang ==
=== Zhang's Buddhist–Daoist approach to history ===
In a time when most Chinese intellectuals favored modernization ideologies and endorsed history as a progressive movement, Zhang Taiyan (Binglin) drew on Buddhism and Daoism to express his critiques. Social and intellectual life during the Qing dynasty was primarily influenced by "widely circulating discourses of modern philosophy and the concrete forces of the global capitalist system of nation-states". Following a string of defeats in the late 19th century, Chinese intellectuals began to focus on how China could be improved in order to compete in the global capitalist system. This marked a clear departure from previous Chinese thought, which had primarily focused on the teachings of traditional classical Chinese texts. This was thought to effectively prepare bureaucrats for their positions in the imperial government. However, a national crisis—the loss of several armed conflicts—spurred Chinese philosophers towards modernization thinking. Zhang was particularly revolutionary, as he "mobilized Buddhism for politics" and combined elements of Yogacara Buddhist thought with concepts he had developed himself in his pre-revolutionary years.

Zhang understood the conditions of possibility as described by Immanuel Kant in Buddhist terms, namely, "as the karmic fluctuations of the seeds in alaya consciousness (the storehouse consciousness)". He viewed history as an "unconscious process of drives". The storehouse consciousness, which is defined as the highest level of consciousness, contains seeds that initiate historical process. He believed that "karmic experiences develop from unseen roots, which stem from seeds. As we act in these experiences, we unconsciously plant new karmic seeds and so a cycle of the interplay between past, present and future continues". In his essay On Separating the Universal and Particular in Evolution, Zhang utilizes this framework to explain Hegel's philosophy of history. What Hegel describes as "a triumphant march of spirit" is actually "a degenerative disaster created by karmic seeds" according to Zhang.

=== Yogacara Buddhism and Chinese philosophy ===
Yogacara (or Weishi) primarily focuses on cognitive processes that could be used to overcome ignorance that prevented one from escaping the karmic rounds of birth and death. Practicers/proponents of Yogacara stress attention to the issues of cognition, consciousness, perception, and epistemology. Yogacara Buddhism is based on the following concepts: three self-natures, storehouse consciousness, overturning the basis, and the theory of eight consciousnesses.

Zhang viewed the teachings and principles of Yogacara as "a sophisticated knowledge system which could serve as an authoritative alternative to the knowledge systems being introduced from the West."

Yogacara focuses on meditative practice, epistemology and logic. This strain of Buddhism ceased to be popular in China by the time period of the Yuan dynasty (1206–1368). Yogacara principles and writings were reintroduced to China during the 19th century from Japan, where they had been flourishing for centuries. This revival was primarily led by Liang Qichao, Yang Wenhui, Tan Sitong, Zhang Taiyan and many other prominent intellectuals of the late Qing period.

Yogacara was popular with the intellectuals of this period because it was characterized by structured and organized thoughts and concepts. Zhang found Weishi easy to understand "because it was essentially concerned with mingxiang (definitions of terms), matters in which he had been well grounded due to his rigorous training in the evidential learning techniques associated with Han Learning approaches to Classical Studies (jingxue)."

Zhang wrote:

There is good reason for my singular respect for faxiang (an alternate name for Weishi). Modern scholarship [in China] has gradually followed the path of 'seeking verification in actual events.' Of course the detailed analysis carried out by Han Learning scholars was far superior to that which scholars in the Ming were able to achieve. With the beginnings of science [introduced in China in the late-nineteenth century] scholars applied themselves with even greater precision. It is for this reason that faxiang learning was inappropriate to the situation in China during the Ming but most appropriate in modern times. This was brought about by the trends that have informed the development of scholarship.

Zhang wanted to promote Yogacara Buddhism as a philosophy, not a religion. Buddhism was thought to be a form of scientific philosophy superior to religion, science and philosophy. Zhang based his philosophical vision on the doctrine of three natures. He believed that the third nature—the nature of existence being perfectly accomplished—was suitable to serve as the foundation for Chinese philosophy and religion. Zhang was not the only one who believed this—the late Qing discussion of religion became a philosophical project designed to modernize China so it could compete "as a nation-state in an increasingly rationalized and reified world." He used this belief to critique Western philosophers Kant, Hegel and Plato, who he felt only represented the first and second doctrines of Yogacara.

Zhang felt that yinming, or the knowledge of reasons, enabled people to recover the true meaning of Mohist and Confucian tests in ways that Western philosophy could not. Zhang's decision to frame his comparative inquiry in terms of yinming demonstrates his belief in yinming as a more effective 'art of reasoning' than either the 'Mohist Canons' or European logic. In his essay Discussion on the Equalization of Things, Zhang uses Yogacara Buddhist concepts to make sense of Zhuangzi, an ancient Daoist philosopher. He claims that Zhuangzi's notion of equality entails making distinctions without the use of concepts:

'Equalizing things' (qiwuzhe) refers to absolute equality (pingdeng). If we look at its meaning carefully, it does not simply refer to seeing sentient beings as equal...One must speak form (xiang, laksana) without words, write of form without concepts (ming) and think form without mind. It is ultimate equality. This accords with the 'equalization of things.'

Zhang tried to render equality without contradiction between the particular and the universal. Zhang believed that conceptual framework is generated through our karmic actions. When compared to his contemporary Liu Shipei's attempt to extract logic from the masters of the Zhou dynasty, Zhang's writings and thoughts display a higher level of theoretical sophistication as he had a firmer grasp of the purposes and limitations of European logic as well as knowledge of yinming principles and thinking. This enabled him to draw more convincing parallels between the notions he gleaned from his plethora of sources.

== Legacy ==
Intellectual historian Joachim Kurtz argues that Zhang's most important contribution to the field of Chinese philosophy was "to show that it was possible, at least on an elementary level, to assert the validity of a 'traditional', namely Chinese Buddhist conceptual framework while simultaneously redefining individual notions, such as the boundaries of the logical realm, in accordance with a Western-derived understanding".

Zhang continues to be viewed as an important intellectual figure in modern China in part because of his call for dissociate ideas of sovereign power from Heaven's Mandate and to instead associate it with political realism and human capacity.

== Additional Sources ==
- Furth, Charlotte (1976). "The Sage as Rebel: The inner world of Chang Ping-lin". In Furth, Charlotte (ed.). The Limits of Change. Harvard University.
- He, Jiuying 何九盈 (1995). Zhongguo xiandai yuyanxue shi 中囯现代语言学史 [A history of modern Chinese linguistics]. Guangzhou: Guangdong jiaoyu chubanshe.
- Kurtz, Joachim (July 1, 2011). "Heritage Unearthed: The Discovery of Chinese Logic". The Discovery of Chinese Logic. Leiden, Netherlands: Brill.
- Laitinen, Kauko (1990). Chinese Nationalism in the Late Qing Dynasty: Zhang Binglin as an Anti-Manchu Propagandist. London: Curzon Press.
- Makeham, John (2012). "Zhang Taiyan, Yogacara Buddhism, and Chinese Philosophy". In Makeham, John (ed.). Learning to Emulate the Wise. Chinese University Press. ISBN 9789629964788.
- Murthy, Viren (2011). "Buddhist Epistemology and Modern Self-Identity: Zhang Taiyan's 'On Establishing Religion'". The Political Philosophy of Zhang Taiyan. Leiden, NL: Brill. ISBN 9789004203884.
- Tang, Zhijun 湯志鈞 (1996). Zhang Taiyan zhuan 章太炎傳 [A biography of Zhang Taiyan]. Taipei: Taiwan Commercial Press.
- Xu, Shoushang 许寿裳 (2004). Zhang Taiyan zhuan 章太炎傳 [A biography of Zhang Taiyan]. Tianjin: Baihua wenyi chubanshe.
- Zhongguo da baike quanshu (1980–1993). 1st Edition. Beijing; Shanghai: Zhongguo da baike quanshu chubanshe.
