= Provisional Constitution of the Republic of China =

Document intended as a temporary constitution

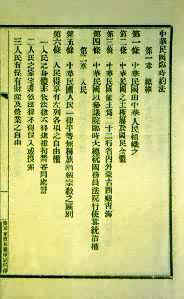
The first page of the Provisional Constitution of the Republic of China

The Provisional Constitution of the Republic of China was the constitutional law of the Republic of China during the tutelage period. It was the second constitutional law since the Qing Empire was renamed and restructured as the Republic of China. It was enacted by the National Government in May 1931 and was abolished naturally until December 25, 1946, after the implementation of the Constitution of the Republic of China. However, it was never promulgated by the competent authority.

After victory in the Xinhai Revolution, the Nanjing Provisional Government of the Republic of China, led by Sun Yat-sen, framed the Provisional Constitution of the Republic of China (simplified Chinese: 中华民国临时约法; traditional Chinese: 中華民國臨時約法; pinyin: Zhōnghuá Mínguó línshí yuēfǎ, 1912), which was an outline of basic regulations with the qualities of a formal constitution.

On 11 March 1912, the Provisional Constitution replaced the previous organizational outline of the government, and came into effect as the supreme law. It was later replaced by a constitutional compact instituted by Yuan Shikai on 1 May 1914. However, it was restored once again on 29 June 1916, by President Li Yuanhong.

The Constitutional Protection Movement launched by the Military Government of the Republic of China in Guangzhou on 10 September 1917 was intended to "protect" this provisional constitution. However, as the Warlord Era divided the country into warring factions, the provisional constitution was gradually superseded by the constitutions issued by each rival government. In the Beiyang Government, the provisional constitution was replaced by Cao Kun's constitution on 10 October 1923. In the Nanjing Government, the provisional constitution was not replaced until 1 June 1931, when the Provisional Constitution of the Political Tutelage Period was announced, although the old constitution was already rarely discussed after the establishment of the Nationalist Government on 1 July 1925. From 1928 onwards, the Nationalists were operating under an Organic Law that had an ambiguous relationship with the 1931 Provisional Constitution as it was not completely superseded.

The Constitution of the Republic of China superseded it in 1946, ending the Period of Tutelage. At the same time, this constitution also replaced the Constitution of the Empire of Japan, which was the supreme law of Taiwan during Japanese colonial rule prior to retrocession.

== Outline of the constitution ==
1. The government system was to imitate the French cabinet: the Senate at the time wanted to restrain Yuan Shikai's ambitions, and they changed the presidential system to a parliamentary system so that Yuan would be turned into a figurehead.
2. The general principles were to be outlined concisely, regulating the fundamental elements of the nation in principle.
3. The presidential election would still be held in the Senate according to the organizational outline of the provisional Government.
4. The Judiciary system was completely independent, which matched the principle of separation of powers: the provisional Constitution regulated that the provisional president and the Minister of the Judiciary would appoint judges separately. Trials were to be administered by judges independently without the intervention of the government.

== Background of the enactment of the law ==
In 1928, the Nationalist Government led by Kuomintang achieved a basic victory in the Northern Expedition, and the domestic situation in China had finally been settled. According to the provisions of Sun Yat-sen's National Founding Guidelines, the military administration ended, and the country would enter the tutelage period.

In March 1929, the 3rd National Congress of the Kuomintang decided not to formulate a constitution for the time being. Instead, they formulated the National Government Organization Act and the Tutelage Period Guidelines to supplement the National Founding Guidelines.

On May 8, 1931, the National Assembly was held. The Political Tutelage Period Act was passed on May 12 and was promulgated and implemented by the National Government on June 1.

== Content ==
The Political Tutelage Period Act has a total of eight chapters and 89 articles. The content of the Act includes a general outline, people's rights, tutelage guidelines, national livelihood, national education, central and local authorities, governmental organization, and supplementary regulations. Its primary characteristics are as follows:

1. For the freedom and rights of citizens, except for religious beliefs, indirect protectionism is implemented, i.e., the protection of human rights depends on laws, and the government can restrict it according to the laws.

2. The Tutelage Period Guidelines have reconfirmed the form of party governance, and the party governing the country is the Party-State.

3. There are two chapters on national livelihood and education. They announce the government's policy guidelines and goals in these two respects awhile implementing Sun Yat-sen's policy on the livelihood of the people.

4. The authority of the central and local governments are subject to the principle of equal rights. It is also subject to the content of the powers of both parties, except for industrial and commercial patents and monopoly franchises, which are under the jurisdiction of the central government; the rest are regulated in detail by law.

5. The National Government organization includes five yuans and a committee system, i.e., it is composed of National Government committees. In addition to representing the Republic of China, the party chairman also nominates the president of the five yuans. Therefore, the National Government organization displays obvious characteristics of the presidential system. Provinces and counties would prepare for self-government, and governors would be elected by the people.

6. The supplementary regulations stipulate that this Provisional Constitution is the supreme law of the tutelage period. The Central Executive Committee of the Kuomintang is responsible for interpreting the law. The Provisional Constitution does not specify the amendment procedures. The amendment procedures can only be implemented in accordance with the established procedures, i.e., re-election of the National Assembly. It is, therefore, a rigid Provisional Constitution.

Regarding territory, the 1931 provisional constitution states, "The territory of the Republic of China includes all the provinces, Mongolia, and Tibet."

== Abolishment ==
The Provisional Constitution of the Republic of China was the Provisional Constitution of the Tutelage period. It was initially scheduled to be abolished at the end of the Tutelage period in 1936. However, due to the Japanese invasion of China, the constitutional National Assembly was delayed repeatedly, and constitutionalism was not initiated.

In 1946, the Constitutional National Assembly enacted the Constitution of the Republic of China, along with the Preparatory Procedures for its Implementation. All laws that conflict with the Constitution were to be repealed immediately. At the same time, the National Government promulgated the Act on the Termination of the Tutelage Period to end the government operation during this period.
