= Progressive Party (China) =

Progressive Party 進步黨
- Chairman: Li Yuanhong
- Founded: 29 May 1913
- Dissolved: 1916
- Merger of: Republican Party; Democratic Party; Unity Party
- Succeeded by: Constitution Discussions Clique; Constitution Research Clique
- Ideology: Chinese nationalism Monarchism; Conservatism; Constitutionalism; Statism; Unitarism; Faction: Conservative liberalism Classical liberalism Liberalism (Chinese)
- Political position: Right-wing

The Progressive Party (traditional Chinese: 進步黨; simplified Chinese: 进步党; pinyin: jìnbùdǎng; Wade–Giles: Chin-pu tang) was a political party in the Republic of China from 1913 to 1916.

== Origins ==
Chinese constitutionalism was a movement that originated after the First Sino-Japanese War (1894-1895). A young group of intellectuals in China led by Kang Youwei argued that China's defeat was due to its lack of modern institutions and legal framework which the Self-Strengthening Movement had failed to deliver. They saw the recent rise of new powers such as Germany, Italy, and Japan coincide with their adoption of constitutions. By having a constitution as the basis for social and political organization, they surmise that all of China's ills could be repaired. Like the Chinese Nationalists, these constitutionalists underwent many name changes after they first coalesced following the end of the Hundred Days' Reform in 1898.

The Chinese Empire Reform Association (known as the "Baohuanghui" or "Protect the Emperor Society" in Chinese) was formed in Victoria, Canada on 20 July 1899 by Kang Youwei and Liang Qichao, the Hundred Days' Reformers who were exiled after the palace coup by Empress Dowager Cixi. The Emperor they referred to was the Guangxu Emperor. In August 1900, they sponsored Tang Caichang's uprising in Hankou which failed disastrously and forced them to rethink their strategy. Also known as the Reform Association, they had to compete with their fellow outlaws, the Tongmenghui ("Revolutionary Alliance") led by Sun Yat-sen for influence and money in the Overseas Chinese community. The Baohuanghui's platform was constitutional monarchy and peaceful reform while the Tongmenghui wanted republic and revolution. In this respect, the Baohuanghui was more popular due to the traditional cultural mindset that abhorred disorder. Liang's support for peaceful reform was not consistent, he vacillated between violence and reform often.

In 1908, both the Emperor and Cixi had died. The group renamed itself in Chinese as the "Empire Constitutionalist Association" (帝國憲政會) (the English name was not changed), often referred to as the Constitutionalist Party (憲政黨), and was allowed to operate in China. They helped the Qing court set up provincial assemblies and a National Assembly in 1910. They were, however, deeply disappointed that the assemblies existed to give advice only. In addition, the Qing court's draft constitution was a near word for word copy of Japan's Meiji Constitution with the exception that the Emperor was given significantly more power. The new cabinet system consisted of members from the Aisin Gioro clan, making it more nepotistic than before. After a brief period as the "Empire Unity Party" (帝国统一党), on 4 June 1911 they became known as the Friends of the Constitution (憲友會). The Constitutionalist party was the first legally registered political party in China.

During the Wuchang Uprising, the first politician to side with the mutineers was Tang Hualong, a Constitutionalist and leader of the Hubei provincial assembly, who took over the civilian administrative side of the revolution. Fed up with years of frustration, many Constitutionalists joined the 1911 Revolution, one noticeable exception was Kang Youwei who remained loyal to Emperor Puyi.

In 1912, Liang returned to China and the party renamed itself as the Democratic Party. It came in fourth in the National Assembly elections behind the Nationalist, Republican, and Unity Parties.

== Foundation to dissolution ==
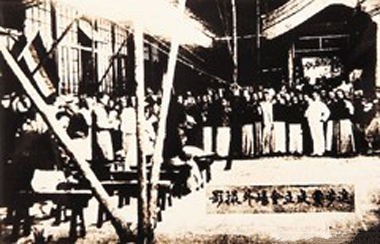
First congress of the Progressive Party on May 29, 1913

The Democrats merged with the Republican Party and the Unity Party to form the Progressive Party (進步黨) on 29 May 1913; together they had 223 seats in the Assembly. The Republicans were largely financed by Provisional President Yuan Shikai, who was not an actual party member. They were an ultranationalist and militarist party. Unity was led by Zhang Binglin and represented the interests of the civil service and gentry. All three parties had advocated a strong, centralized national government, with some wanting to abolish provincial and local divisions altogether. Vice President Li Yuanhong was made party chairman but real leadership was in the hands of Liang Qichao. The party's platform was nationalism with strong central government, liberty through the rule of law, and peaceful foreign policy. As the second largest party, it portrayed the rival Nationalists as supporters of mob rule.

The Progressives supported Yuan against the failed Second Revolution but objected to the outlawing of the Nationalist Party since only some of its members took part. The expulsion of the Nationalists led to the Assembly losing its quorum so Yuan disbanded it altogether which was also fiercely opposed by the Progressives.

When Yuan tried to crown himself emperor, Liang convinced Yunnan's military governor, Cai E, to lead the National Protection War against Yuan. Liang reconciled the war with the party's antirevolutionary stance by arguing that the war was not a revolution but an effort to put down Yuan's rebellion against the constitutional republic. Progressive Party branches across the country agitated for the overthrow of Yuan and the party's membership expanded greatly. Yuan's government became paralyzed and he abandoned his scheme. The party's leadership, however, was split into pro- and anti-Yuan factions, thus causing its collapse.

== Research Clique ==
After Yuan's death, Li Yuanhong became President and the National Assembly convened again. The party split into two factions: the Constitution Research Clique led by Liang and the Constitution Discussions Clique led by Tang Hualong. Liang supported Premier Duan Qirui's plan to push China into World War I on the Allied side against the wishes of President Li in hopes of regaining lost territories. When the Assembly was dissolved again during the Manchu Restoration (of which Kang Youwei took part) some ex-Progressives joined Sun Yat-sen's Constitutional Protection Movement. Liang and his followers refused to join because they felt a rival government was harmful to China's national integrity and that the movement was itself unconstitutional because it was a military government.

After reuniting with Tang's faction, Liang ran what was left of his party as the Research Clique (研究系) in the 1918 elections for a new assembly but placed a distant third behind Duan's Anfu Club and Liang Shiyi's Communications Clique. Tang was assassinated in Victoria, British Columbia on 1 September by a rogue member of the Chinese Revolutionary Party. Shortly after the Paris Peace Conference, Liang retired from politics but the Research Clique was still influential in Beiyang government politics until the Beijing coup in 1924. Mao Zedong called them "non-revolutionary democrats".

== Post-Liang ==
Minus Liang, several members in 1927 created the Democratic Constitutionalist Party (民主憲政黨) but they were based in the United States so they had very little influence in Chinese politics. Within China, Carsun Chang started the 1931 National Renaissance Society (再生社) which was succeeded by the 1932 China National Socialist Party (中國國家社會黨) which mixed Liang's reformism with Sun Yat-sen's Three Principles of the People. They were upset that Chiang Kai-shek's rule was a personalistic dictatorship and that the Nationalists had ignored their democratic principles. Opposing both the Nationalists and the Chinese Communist Party, they aimed to be the third force in Chinese politics, so they created an umbrella group of small democratic parties called the China Democratic League. The CDL pushed for the long delayed constitution and reconciliation between the Communists and Nationalists especially after the New Fourth Army Incident.

When the CDL became increasingly pro-Communist, the National Socialists withdrew and merged with the Democratic Constitutionalists on 15 August 1946 to form the China Democratic Socialist Party. They fled to Taiwan at the end of the Chinese Civil War and along with the Nationalists and the Chinese Youth Party, were the only legal parties for decades. In Taiwan, they offered the same soft criticisms they have been giving since their earliest incarnations. The Democratic Socialists lost all their seats in the Legislative Yuan and National Assembly after free and fair elections began in the 1980s. Within the People's Republic of China, the China Democratic League continues to exist as part of the United Front.
