= Communications Clique =

Chinese interwar interest group

The Communications Clique (Chinese: 交通系; pinyin: Jiāotōng Xì) was a powerful interest group of politicians, bureaucrats, technocrats, businessmen, engineers, and labour unionists in China's Beiyang government (1912–1928). It is also known as the Cantonese Clique because many of its leaders hailed from Guangdong. They were named after the Ministry of Posts and Communications which was responsible for railways, postal delivery, shipping, and telephones as well as the Bank of Communications. This ministry earned five times more revenue for the government than all the other ministries combined.

The clique was founded by Tang Shaoyi but it was led by Liang Shiyi throughout most of its existence. They were instrumental in the rise of Yuan Shikai in the late Qing and early republican period. Because they were Yuan's biggest supporters of his attempt to restore the monarchy, their leaders were forced to flee the country when President Li Yuanhong ordered their arrest.

In their absence, the New Communications Clique (1916-1919) was formed by Cao Rulin. President Feng Guozhang vacated these arrest warrants in early 1918, allowing Liang and Zhou Ziqi to return. Within a few months, the old clique became powerful enough to run as a quasi-political party in the National Assembly on a platform of modernization. It was a distant second compared to Duan Qirui's Anfu Club. Together with the Research Clique, they used political maneuvering to deny Cao Kun the vice-presidency, Cao ended up blaming Duan for his loss. Cao Rulin's conduct during the 1919 Paris Peace Conference caused the May Fourth Movement which led to his downfall and the collapse of this rival "new" clique.

Liang became premier in 1921 after Jin Yunpeng was forced to resign by Zhang Zuolin. Wu Peifu removed Liang from his month-long premiership because he suspected Liang gave concessions to the Japanese during the Washington Naval Conference, Liang denied the allegations. Zhang Zuolin opposed the removal and that sparked the First Zhili-Fengtian War. For a very brief period after the war, Zhou Ziqi was acting President of the Republic of China. Zhou left politics after complaining of Zhili Clique domination. The clique was dissolved during the Northern Expedition. What they once controlled was given to powerful Nationalist businessmen like T. V. Soong and H.H. Kung.

The clique supported training programs and better working conditions for its rail workers. They even supported their strikes against local warlords. They were friendly to the Fengtian clique (half of the country's railroads were in Manchuria) and hostile to the Anhui and Zhili cliques. Their control of the railways threatened the logistics of warlords that opposed them. In 1923, Wu Peifu attempted to wrest control of the Hankou-Beijing railway by inviting Communists to defect their workers but it succeeded too well and the Communists began agitating against Wu. He responded violently leading to 35 deaths and many injuries which only served to advertise the little-known and nascent Communist Party.
