= Tang Hualong =

Chinese politician (1874–1918)

Tang Hualong (1874 – September 1, 1918) was the education minister from 1914 to 1915 and the interior minister in 1917 in the Republic of China.

== Biography ==
Tang Hualong was born in 1874, and was the older brother of naval officer Tang Xiangming. A prominent member of the Progressive Party of China, Tang served in the governments of Xu Shichang and Duan Qirui. He was assassinated on September 1, 1918, in Victoria, British Columbia, Canada by a local Chinese barber and Kuomintang member named Wong Chun (1886–1918), who later killed himself.
