= General Long =

General Long may refer to:

- Armistead Lindsay Long (1825-1891), Confederate States Army brigadier general
- Arthur Long (British Army officer) (1866–1941), British Army brigadier general
- Charles G. Long (1869–1943), U.S. Marine Corps major general
- Daniel E. Long Jr. (fl. 1960s–2010s), U.S. Army major general
- Earl C. Long (1883–1983), U.S. Marine Corps major general
- Eli Long (1837–1903), Union Army major general
- George Long (bishop) (1874–1930), Australian Imperial Force brigadier general
- Oscar Fitzalan Long (1852–1928), U.S. Army brigadier general
- Robert Ballard Long (1771–1825), British Army lieutenant general
- Walter Long (British Army officer) (1879–1917), British Army brigadier general
- Long Jiguang (1867–1925), Chinese Imperial general
- Long Jinguang (1863–1917), Chinese Imperial general
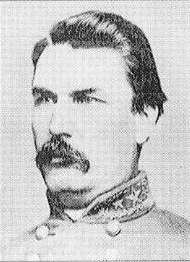
Armistead Lindsay Long

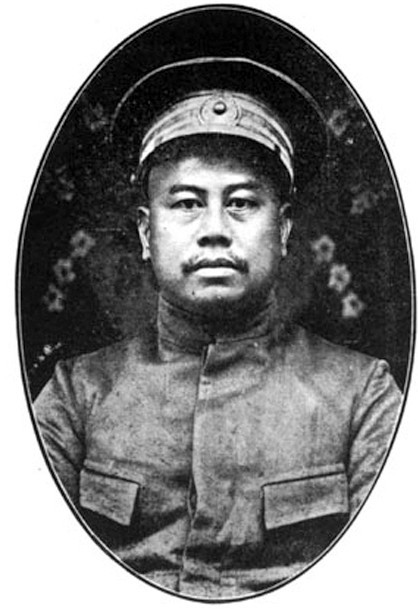
Long Jiguang

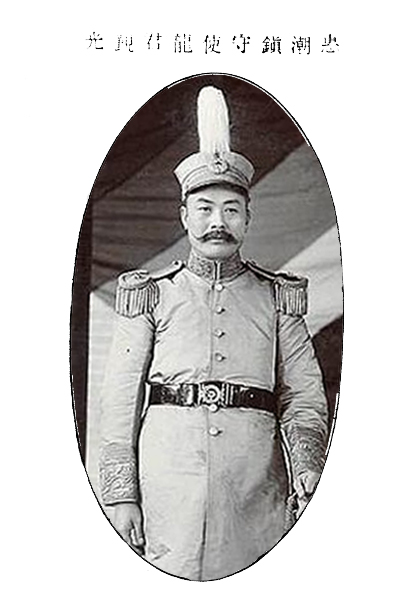
Long Jinguang

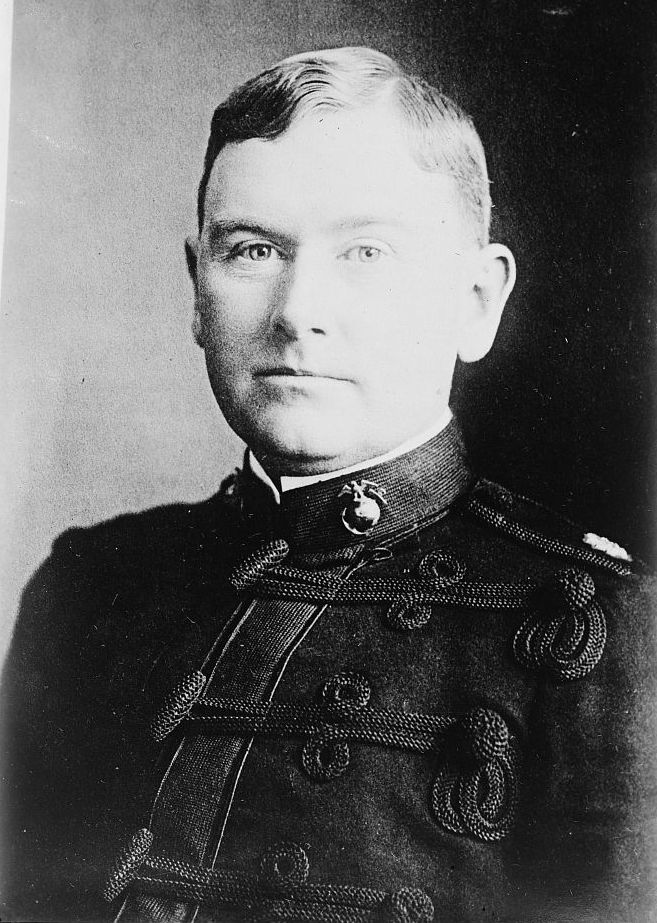
Charles Grant Long

== See also ==
- General Lang (disambiguation)
