= Empire of China (1915–1916) =

Brief restoration of monarchy in China by Yuan Shikai

Empire of China 中華帝國
- 1915–1916
- Flag National emblem
- Anthem: 中華雄立宇宙間 "China Heroically Stands in the Universe"
- Areas de facto controlled by the Empire of China shown in green de jure in light green
- Status: Unrecognized state
- Capital: Beijing
- Largest city: Shanghai
- Official languages: Standard Chinese
- Government: Unitary constitutional monarchy (de jure); Unitary absolute monarchy under a military dictatorship (de facto)
- Emperor
  - 1915–1916: Yuan Shikai
- Prime Minister
  - 1915–1916: Lu Zhengxiang
- Legislature: National Assembly
- Historical era: World War I
  - Empire declared: 12 December 1915
  - National Protection War: 25 December 1915
  - Abdication of Yuan Shikai: 22 March 1916
  - Death of Yuan Shikai: 6 June 1916
- Currency: Yuan
| Preceded by | Succeeded by |
| Republic of China | Republic of China |

Empire of China
- Traditional Chinese: 中華帝國
- Simplified Chinese: 中华帝国
Transcriptions
Standard Mandarin
- Hanyu Pinyin: Zhōnghuá dìguó
- Bopomofo: ㄓㄨㄥ ㄏㄨㄚˊ ㄉㄧˋ ㄍㄨㄛˊ
- Wade–Giles: Chung^{1}-hua^{2} Ti^{4}-kuo^{2}
- Tongyong Pinyin: Jhonghuá dìguó

The Empire of China, also known in historiography as the Hongxian regime (Chinese: 洪憲帝制; pinyin: Hǒngxiàn dìzhì; Wade–Giles: Hung^{3}-hsien^{4} ti^{4}-ch’ih^{4}) in certain contexts, was a short-lived attempt by Chinese president Yuan Shikai from late 1915 to early 1916 to reinstate the monarchy in China, with himself as emperor. The attempt ultimately failed, set back the republican cause by several years, and led China into a period of fracture and conflict among various local warlords.

== Background ==
In response to Japan's "Twenty-One Demands", China signed the "Treaty Concerning Southern Manchuria and Eastern Inner Mongolia" and the "Treaty Concerning Shandong" after more than three months of negotiations. In June 1915, the treaty texts were exchanged. Later, there was a sudden rumor in Japanese newspapers that Yuan Shikai intended to proclaim himself emperor. Although Yuan Shikai strongly denied it, the statement that "republicanism is not suitable for China's national conditions" gradually spread in society.

On July 6, Yuan Shikai appointed 10 people including Yang Du and Liang Qichao as members of the Constitution Drafting Committee to draft a new constitution again, which was expected to be completed in November of that year. On 3 August, Professor Frank Goodnow, an American constitutional consultant for Yuan Shikai (arranged by former president of Harvard University Charles Eliot), published "The Republic and the Prince", stating:

"...most The people's intelligence is not very noble...The change from autocracy to a republic is such a sudden move that it is difficult to expect good results...The issue of presidential succession has not been resolved...someday or This kind of problem leads to disasters, if it is not extinguished immediately, or it may be tamed to the point of destroying China's independence... If China uses a monarchy, it is more suitable than a republic, and there is almost no doubt about this."

On 19 August 1915, Yang Du joined forces with Sun Yujun, Li Xiehe, Hu Ying, Liu Shipei and Yan Fu to establish a preparatory committee, stating that "Republicanism does not apply to China." More and more "petition groups" wrote petitions demanding a change in the state system. There were also some voices of opposition. For example, Liang Qichao, leader of the Progressive Party and former justice minister, published "The So-Called Issues with the State System" in the monthly "Greater China" magazine, insisting on his consistent opposition to the change of the state system. However, the Preparatory Committee published a large number of articles supporting the implementation of a constitutional monarchy. Yang Du believed that the country must be "fixed as one" (under unified leadership) in order to be stable. He argued that only in a stable environment can the country establish a constitution and gradually become stronger and stronger. He put forward two arguments to prove that only the implementation of constitutional monarchy can save China: First, Chinese people had a low level of education, and it is difficult for a republic to establish a constitution. Only a monarch can establish a constitution. Rather than a republic and a true autocracy, it is better to establish a constitutional monarch in a legitimate manner. Second, unrest is prone to occur when a republic elects a president. He said:

"Unless the disadvantages of competing for the head of state are eliminated first, the country will never have peace. The only plan is to have President Yi as the monarch and establish the head of a country in an absolutely uncontestable position. A common man can hardly stop the chaos."

In addition, Yuan Shikai received the "National Protector Envoy Encouraging Jin to Proclaim Emperor", which was signed by governors of all provinces in the country, including Yunnan representatives Cai E and Tang Jiyao, who later launched a war to protect the country against Yuan Shikai. The persuasion document reads:

... Zhigui and others have truly seen China's national conditions. Unless they resolutely abandon democracy and use the monarch, it will not be enough to establish long-term public security. Therefore, they use joint words to persuade the head of state, pay attention to public opinion, and support correct opinions, so that the country's system can be fundamentally solved and the country's foundation can be solved as soon as possible. Determine the fundamental status...

The "Preparatory Committee" established on 23 August convened provincial civil and military officials and chambers of commerce to Beijing to discuss state affairs. Except for a few of the civil and military officials who expressed support for the republic, most of them expressed the need to change the state system. On 25 August, Cai E led the soldiers to petition for imperialism. Yuan Shikai's son Yuan Keding also forged the "Shuntian Times" to create an atmosphere in which the Japanese Empire supported Yuan Shikai's claim to the throne.

== National Congress ==
On 1 September 1915, the Senate held an opening ceremony. Shen Yunpei, Zhou Jiayan, Yang Zanxu and others petitioned to change the state system. In the following days, petition groups supporting the monarchy submitted petitions to the Senate, setting off a wave of petitions for the implementation of a constitutional monarchy. Faced with the increasing number of public opinion groups (i.e., petition groups) claiming to represent public opinion and supporting Yuan Shikai's ascension to the throne, on 6 September, Yuan Shikai sent Yang Shiqi to the Senate Acting Legislative Yuan to read out his opinion: "As the president sees it, reforming the state system, there are many longitudes and latitudes, so we should be cautious; if we do it in a hurry, we may be hindered. The president has the responsibility to maintain the overall situation and thinks it is inappropriate."

The trend seemed to subside slightly, but on the 14th, Shen Yunpei, Wu Zesheng, Zhao Ti and others made a second petition, and Liang Shiyi and others even established the "National Petition Federation" on the 19th to encourage the organization of a petition group and submit a third petition to the Senate, demanding a national meeting. At the conference, representatives from the whole country are elected to decide on state issues. On 6 October, the Senate acting as the Legislative Yuan passed the "Organic Law of the National Congress", which was promulgated and implemented by Yuan Shikai two days later. Then, 1,993 national representatives were elected nationwide. At 9 a.m. on 11 December, the national representatives voted on the change of state system. As a result, the National Congress unanimously approved the constitutional monarchy. At about 11 o'clock in the morning, the representatives of the provinces requested Yuan Shikai to be the emperor of the Chinese Empire for the first time. Yuan declined, citing his lack of virtue and incompetence. At 6 o'clock in the afternoon, the representatives asked Yuan to be the emperor again. The following day, Yuan accepted the second recommendation from the representatives, while simultaneously saying:

Secondly, the establishment of Hongji is a heavy matter. It should not be carried out in a hurry, which will cause waste. All ministries and departments should be ordered to make detailed preparations for their own affairs. Once the preparations are completed, the petition will be implemented.

In reality, while Yuan did not immediately ascend the throne, he had already secretly established a ceremony preparation office on 29 November to prepare for the enthronement and select the date of ascension. Zhu Qiqian also supervised the construction of various palaces in the Forbidden City. Yuan's legal advisor, Ariga Nagao, drafted the "New Imperial Code" based on the "Japanese Imperial Model":

1. The traditional descendants of the great emperor of the Chinese Empire last for eternity.
2. The throne of the great emperor is traditionally the eldest son of the crown prince. If the crown prince has a relationship, the title is passed down to the grandson of the crown prince. If there is a relationship between the direct emperor and the grandson, then the emperor's second son will be appointed as the crown prince.
3. The great emperor of the Chinese Empire is the great emperor of the five ethnic groups of Han, Manchu, Mongolia, Hui and Tibet. Princes and princesses can marry subjects of the five ethnic groups.
4. From the royal family down to the prince, as for the clan, the laws and crimes are punished according to the same laws as the common people.
5. Princes and princesses may serve as naval or army officers, and may not organize political parties or serve as important political officials.
6. Abolish the eunuch system forever.
7. Establish female officials in the palace and abolish the system of selecting palace maids forever.
8. The system of tributes from all parties shall be permanently abolished (except that tributes from Manchu, Mongolian, Hui, and Tibetan princes and princes during annual pilgrimages are still allowed to be processed as usual).
9. Royal ceremonial matters shall be in charge of the ministers of the palace.
10. No relatives of the emperor are allowed to engage in business or compete with the common people for profit.

On December 21, 22 and 23, Yuan Shikai conferred five-level knighthoods on provincial generals, patrol envoys, military envoys, garrison envoys, division commanders and those with military power (details below). On the 31st, it was announced that the following year would be changed to the first year of Hongxian, taking the meaning of "carrying forward the Constitution", and planned to change the country's name to the Chinese Empire, and the presidential palace to be changed to Xinhua Palace (today's Zhongnanhai).

== Prelude and formation ==
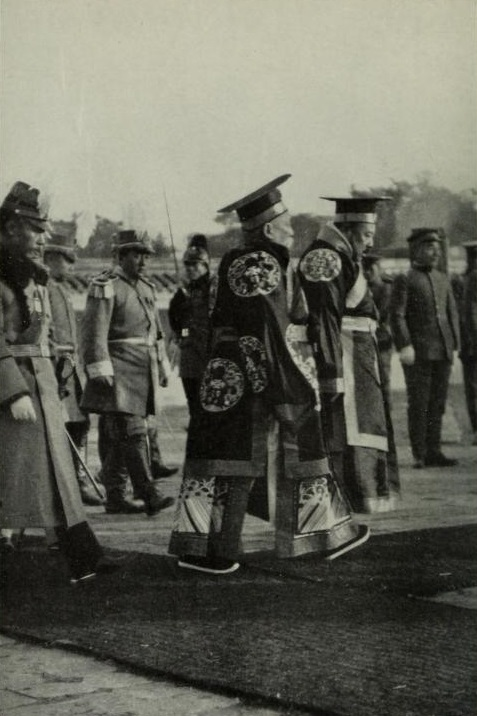
The Hongxian Emperor at his coronation ceremony

After Yuan Shikai was installed as the second Provisional Great President of the Republic of China established by Sun Yat-sen, he took various steps to consolidate his power and remove opposition leaders from office. Both Sun and Yuan were "modernizers", but Sun was considered a "radical revolutionary", while Yuan a "conservative reformer".

To secure his own power he collaborated with various European powers as well as Japan. Around August 1915, he instructed Yang Du et al. to canvass support for a return of the monarchy. On 11 December 1915, an assembly unanimously elected him as Emperor. Yuan ceremonially declined, but "relented" and immediately agreed when the National Assembly petitioned again that day.

On 12 December, Yuan, supported by his son Yuan Keding, declared the Empire of China with himself as the "Great Emperor of the Chinese Empire" (Chinese: 中華帝國大皇帝; pinyin: Zhōnghuá Dìguó Dà Huángdì), taking the era name Hongxian (Chinese: 洪憲; pinyin: Hóngxiàn, "Promote the constitution"). However, Yuan, now known as the Hongxian Emperor, delayed the accession rites until 1 January 1916. As part of his effort to legitimize the new monarchy, Yuan promoted the revival of imperial-era ritual and symbolism, including court dress adapted from earlier dynastic traditions.

The Aisin Gioro family of the former Qing dynasty, which continued to reside in the Forbidden City under the Articles of Favorable Treatment, were reported in monarchist accounts as expressing approval of Yuan’s accession. Proposals were also made for a dynastic marriage between Yuan’s daughter and the former Qing emperor Puyi, as part of efforts to strengthen the perceived legitimacy of the new monarchy.

== Reaction ==
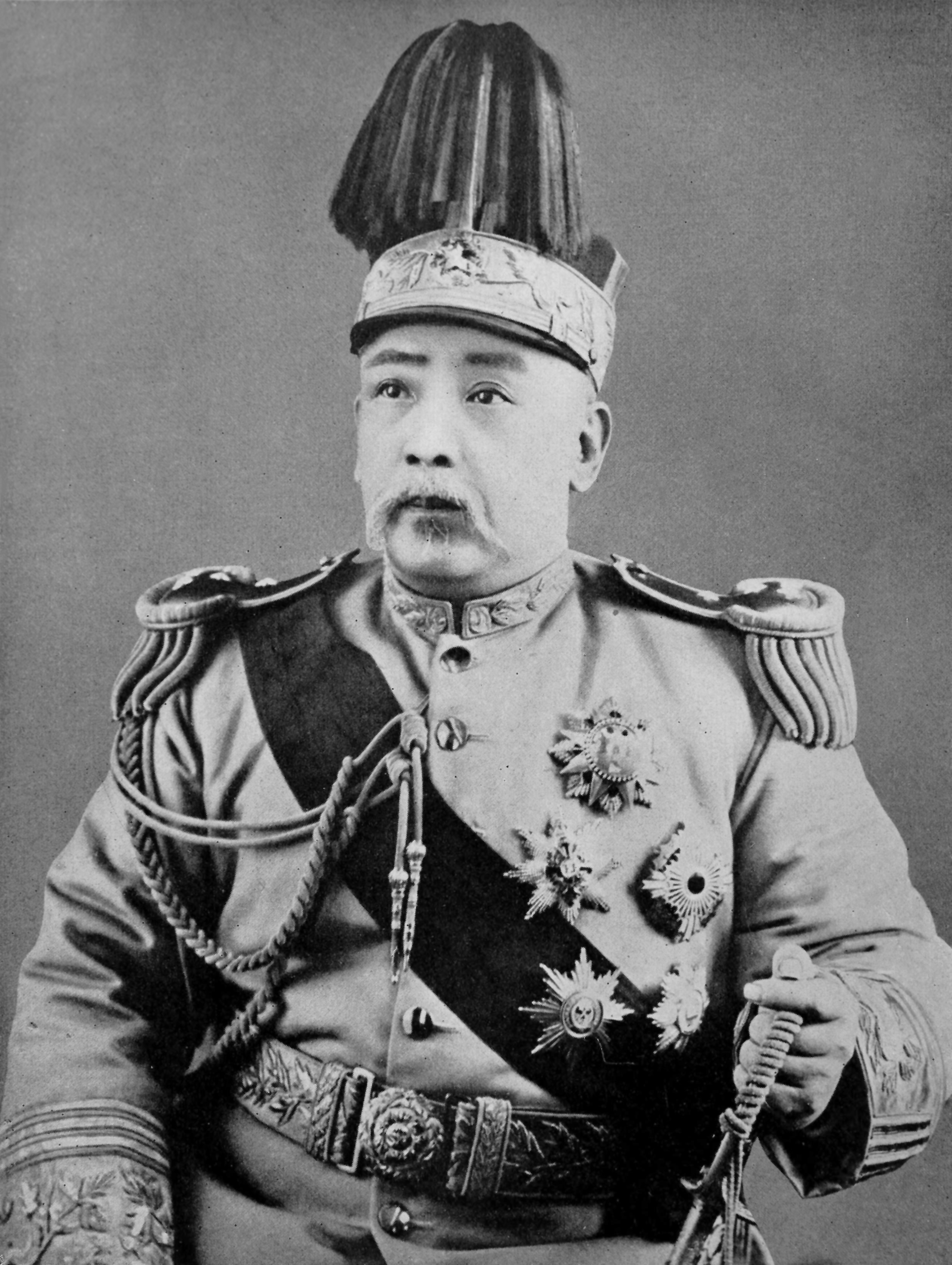
Yuan Shikai as the Hongxian Emperor of his new Imperial China

The year 1916 was to be "Hongxian Year 1" (洪憲元年) rather than "Republic Year 5" (民國五年), but the Hongxian Emperor was opposed by not only the revolutionaries, but far more importantly by his subordinate military commanders, who believed that Yuan's assumption of the monarchy would allow him to rule without depending on the support of the military.

Province after province rebelled after his inauguration, starting with Yunnan, led by the emperor's governor Cai E and general Tang Jiyao and Jiangxi, led by governor Li Liejun. The rebels formed the National Protection Army (護國軍) and thus began the National Protection War. This was followed by other provinces declaring independence from the Empire. The emperor's Beiyang generals, whose soldiers had not received pay once from the imperial government, did not put up an aggressive campaign against the National Protection Army and the Beiyang Army suffered numerous defeats despite being better trained and equipped than the National Protection Army.

Seeing the Hongxian Emperor's weakness and unpopularity, foreign powers withdrew their support (but did not choose sides in the war). The Empire of Japan first threatened to invade, then committed to overthrowing the Hongxian Emperor and recognised both sides of the conflict to be "in a state of war" and allowed Japanese citizens to help the Republicans. Faced with universal opposition, the emperor repeatedly delayed the accession rites to appease his foes. Funding for the ceremony was cut on 1 March. Yuan deliberated abandoning the monarchy with Liang Shiyi on 17 March and abandoned it on 22 March. The "Hongxian" year was abolished on 23 March and the Republic of China was restored. Yuan reigned a total of 83 days.

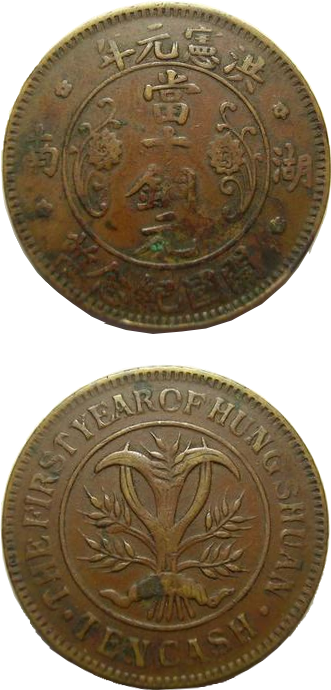
Empire of China ten-cash coin dated "Hongxian Year 1"

After Yuan's death on 6 June, Vice President Li Yuanhong assumed the presidency, and appointed Beiyang general Duan Qirui as his Premier and restored the National Assembly and the provisional Constitution. However, the central authority of the Beijing government was significantly weakened and the demise of Yuan's Empire plunged China into a period of warlordism.

== Economy ==
The government revenue of the Empire of China was around 1 million dollars per month.

== National symbols ==
Although the name of the country in Chinese was changed to the "Empire of China", or "Hongxian" for state matters, the country continued to be officially referred to as the "Republic of China" in English.

The Emperor-to-be had set up the Ritual Regulations Office (禮制館), which issued the new official anthem for the Republic of China, "China Heroically Stands in the Universe" in June 1915, with lyrics written by Yin Chang (廕昌) and music by Wang Lu (王露). The lyrics were slightly modified in December 1915, with "Five Races Under One Union" (共和五族) replaced with the "Abdication system of Yao and Shun" (勳華揖讓; referring to the ancient ideal of a Chinese emperor relinquishing his seat for a nonviolent transition of power) to be used during the Hongxian Emperor's reign.

Chinese lyrics

中華雄立宇宙間，
廓八埏，
華冑來從崑崙巔，
江河浩盪山綿連，
勳華揖讓開堯天，
億萬年。

English translation

China heroically stands in the Universe,
Extends to the Eight Corners,
The glorious descendants from Kunlun Peak.
The rivers turn greatly, the mountains continuous.
Shanrang open up the era of Yao,
For millions of myriads of years.

Yao was a legendary Chinese ruler, and "the era of Yao and Shun" (堯天舜日) is a four-character idiom which means "times of peace and prosperity".

The national flag was changed from the original five-stripe flag to one where the red stripe is a centered cross; however, a flag with the former red stripe as a saltire was the version commonly used.

The national emblem remained as the national emblem of the Republic of China (1913–1928), National emblem of Twelve Symbols of Sovereignty.

== Peerage ==
The Hongxian Emperor conferred numerous titles of nobility upon relatives, political supporters, and military leaders in an effort to consolidate support for the new monarchy and recreate traditional structures of imperial patronage.

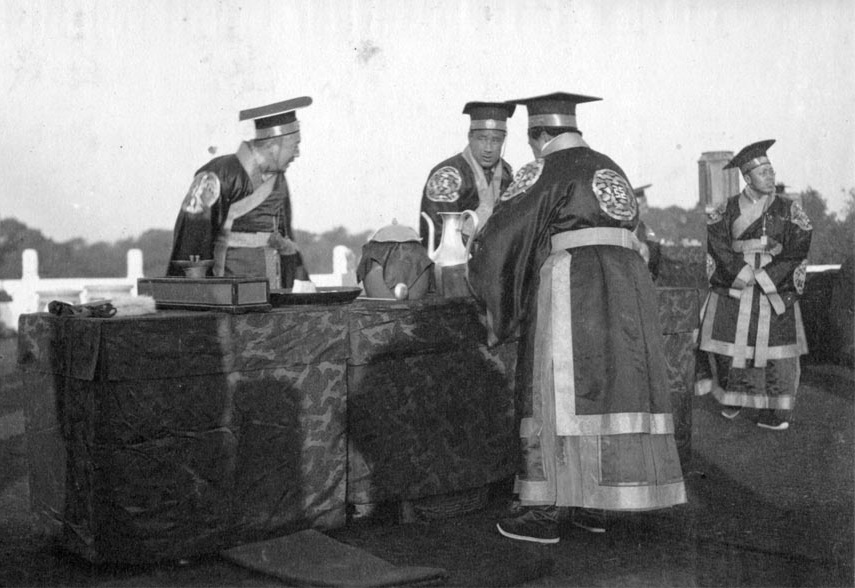
Yuan Shikai (first from left) offering sacrifices to heaven at a winter solstice ceremony, 23 December 1914

Crown Prince (皇太子)

- Yuntai (雲台)

Prince of the First Rank Wuyi (武義親王)

- Duke Yansheng Kong Lingyi (衍聖公 孔令貽)
- Li Yuanhong (黎元洪)

Dukes of the First Rank (一等公)

- Duan Zhigui (段芝貴)
- Feng Guozhang (馮國璋)
- Jiang Guiti (姜桂題)
- Liu Guanxiong (劉冠雄)
- Long Jiguang (龍濟光)
- Ni Sichong (倪嗣衝)
- Zhang Xun (張勳)

Marquesses of the First Rank (一等侯)

- Chen Yi (陳儀)
- Li Chun (李純)
- Lu Rongting (陸榮廷)
- Tang Jiyao (唐繼堯)
- Tang Xiangming (湯薌銘)
- Wang Zhanyuan (王占元)
- Yan Xishan (閻錫山)
- Zhao Ti (趙倜)
- Zhu Rui (朱瑞)

Counts of the First Rank (一等伯)

- Cao Kun (曹錕)
- Jin Yunpeng (靳雲鵬)
- Lu Jianzhang (陸建章)
- Meng Enyuan (孟恩遠)
- Qi Yaolin (齊耀琳)
- Qu Yinguang (屈映光)
- Tian Wenlie (田文烈)
- Yang Shande (楊善德)
- Yang Zengxin (楊增新)
- Zhang Mingqi (張鳴岐)
- Zhang Xiluan (張錫鑾)
- Zhu Jiabao (朱家寶)

Viscounts of the First Rank (一等子)

- Li Houji (李厚基)
- Liu Xianshi (劉顯世)
- Zhang Guangjian (張廣建)
- Zhu Qinglan (朱慶瀾)

Barons of the First Rank (一等男)

- Cai Rukai (蔡儒楷)
- Chen Bingkun (陳炳焜)
- Duan Shuyun (段書雲)
- He Zonglian (何宗蓮)
- Jin Yong (金永)
- Long Jianzhang (龍建章)
- Long Jinguang (龍覲光)
- Lu Yongxiang (盧永祥)
- Lü Diaoyuan (呂調元)
- Ma Anliang (馬安良)
- Pan Juying (潘矩楹)
- Qi Yang (戚揚)
- Ren Kecheng (任可澄)
- Shen Jinjian (沈金鑑)
- Wang Yitang (王揖唐)
- Xu Shiying (許世英)
- Zhang Huaizhi (張懷芝)

Baron of the Third Rank (三等男)

- Feng Yuxiang (馮玉祥)
- He Fenglin (何丰林)
- Xu Lanzhou (許蘭洲)

== Cabinet ==
- Yuan Shikai — Emperor

Term: Dec 1915 – Mar 1916

- Lu Zhengxiang — Prime Minister and Minister of Foreign Affairs

Term: 1915–1916

- Duan Qirui — Minister of War

Term: Dec 1915 — early 1916

- Wang Shizhen — Minister of War

Term: Early 1916 — Mar 1916

- Zhou Ziqi — Minister of Finance

Term: 1915–1916

- Zhu Qiqian — Minister of Interior

Term: 1915–1916

- Cao Rulin — Minister of Communications

Term: 1915–1916

- Wang Shizhen — Minister of War

Term: Early 1916 — Mar 1916

== See also ==
- Warlord Era
- History of the Republic of China
- Military of the Republic of China
- Self-proclaimed monarchy
- National Protection War
- Chinese Empire
- Xin Dynasty and Wu Zhou Dynasty, two other Chinese imperial governments that had only a single emperor.

| Preceded by Republic of China | Empire of China; 1915–1916 | Succeeded by Republic of China |
