= Xu Yunuo =

Chinese writer and poet

- 徐玉诺
- Born: Xu Yanxin (徐言信); 10 November 1894; Lushan County, Henan, Qing Empire
- Died: 9 April 1958 (aged 63); Kaifeng, Henan, China
- Other names: Honghuo (红蠖)
- Occupation(s): author, poet
- Years active: 1920–1958

Xu Yunuo (simplified Chinese: 徐玉诺; traditional Chinese: 徐玉諾, 10 November 1894 – 9 April 1958), also known for his pen name Honghuo (simplified Chinese: 红蠖; traditional Chinese: 紅蠖), was a Chinese poet and writer.

== Biography ==
Xu was born in Lushan County in Henan on 10 November 1894. In 1916, he was admitted to Henan Provincial No.1 Normal School in Kaifeng. During the May Fourth Movement in 1919, Xu was one of the student leaders in Kaifeng and participated in the general strike against Beiyang government. In order to protest the arrests of students by Zhao Ti, the then military governor of Henan, Xu attempted suicide by lying a railway track, and was saved by his teacher Ji Wenfu.

In 1920, Xu published his first work on Morning Post Supplement, and was introduced into Literary Research Association (Chinese: 文学研究会) by Zheng Zhenduo. From 1921 to 1924, he published several works in Fiction Monthly, Morning Post Supplement, Literary Weekly and other publications. In August 1922, he published his poetry collection The Garden of The Future and Snow Dynasty, which received praises from notable writers such as Lu Xun and Mao Dun.

In 1923, Xu moved to Xiamen in southern China to work as newspaper editor and school teacher. In the following decades, he worked as a school teacher in various schools and universities around China, including Jilin Yuwen High School, Xiamen University and Qufu Normal University. In 1956, he became a member of the China Writers Association.

On 9 April 1958, Xu died in Kaifeng due to esophageal cancer.

== Legacy ==
The main character of Ye Shengtao's work The Fire was modeled after Xu.
