= Yuan Jiarong =

Chinese geologist

- 袁家融
- Born: 1904
- Died: 1996 (aged 91–92)
- Education: Columbia University
- Known for: Geologist; member of the Yuan family
- Children: Yuan Jiyan
- Parent(s): Yuan Keding; Ma Caifeng

Yuan Jiarong (Chinese: 袁家融; 1904 – 1996) was a Chinese geologist and member of the prominent Yuan family of the early Republican era. He was the son of Yuan Keding (courtesy name Yuntai), eldest son of Yuan Shikai, Emperor of China from 1915 to 1916.

== Life and career ==
Yuan Jiarong was born in 1904 to Yuan Keding, who held the title Prince Yuntai during his father's brief restoration of the monarchy.

He studied geology abroad, completing advanced studies at Columbia University in the United States. After returning to China around 1930, Yuan joined the Kailuan Coal Mining Company (开滦煤矿) as a geological engineer. In the mid-1930s, he worked as a lead geologist in Suiyuan Province (now part of Inner Mongolia), directing exploration surveys that identified iron-ore deposits in areas such as Baiyun, E’bo, and Daqingshan. These findings later contributed to the establishment of the Baotou steel base (包钢).

Yuan subsequently held academic posts teaching geology, soil science, and English at institutions in Beijing, including National Beijing Normal University and Peking University, and later at Guizhou Institute of Technology (贵阳工学院), where he remained until his retirement in 1964. Contemporary accounts and family recollections describe him as a committed educator and practitioner who helped develop early geological exploration in northern China.

== Family background ==
Yuan Jiarong's father, Yuan Keding (1878–1958), was the eldest son of Yuan Shikai, the President and briefly self-proclaimed Emperor of China. Yuan Jiarong's mother was Ma Caifeng (马彩凤), a concubine of Yuan Keding. The Yuan family played a prominent role in China's transitional era from Empire to Republic.

== Later life and legacy ==
Yuan Jiarong died in 1996.
