= Luke Chia-Liu Yuan =

Chinese-American physicist

Luke Yuan
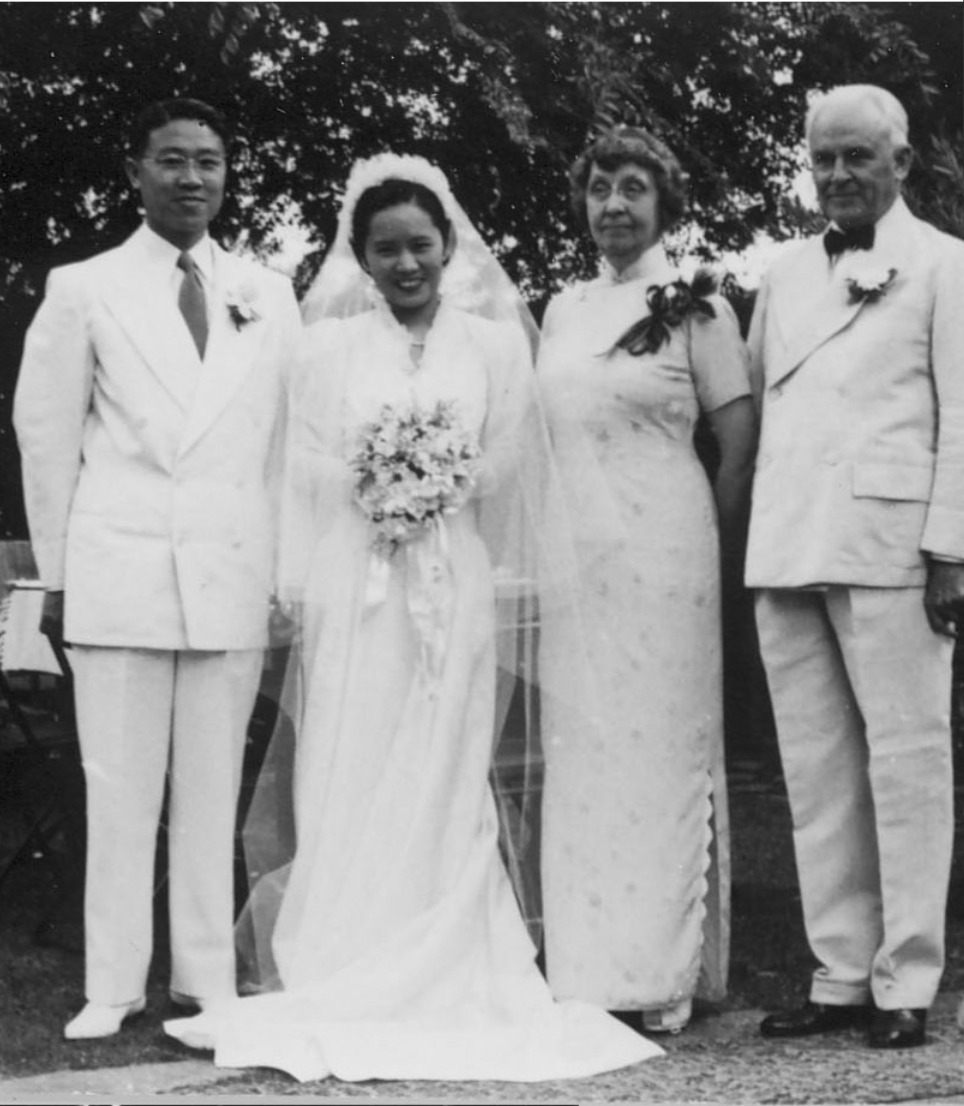
- Luke Yuan (left) with Chien-Shiung Wu (second from left) on their wedding day in the garden of Mr. and Mrs. Robert Millikan
- Born: 5 April 1912; Anyang, Henan, Republic of China
- Died: 11 February 2003 (aged 90); Beijing, China
- Education: Yenching University; California Institute of Technology
- Spouse: Wu Chien-shiung (m. 1942)
- Children: Vincent Yuan (袁緯承)
- Father: Yuan Kewen
- Relatives: Yuan Shikai (grandfather)
- Scientific career
- Fields: Physics
- Workplaces: RCA Laboratories; Brookhaven National Laboratory; Synchrotron Radiation Research Center
- Doctoral advisor: Robert A. Millikan

Luke Chia-Liu Yuan (simplified Chinese: 袁家骝; traditional Chinese: 袁家騮; pinyin: Yuán Jiāliú; Wade–Giles: Yüan Chia-liu; April 5, 1912 – February 11, 2003) was a Chinese-American physicist. He was the husband of the physicist Chien-Shiung Wu, who disproved the conservation of parity.

== Early life and education ==
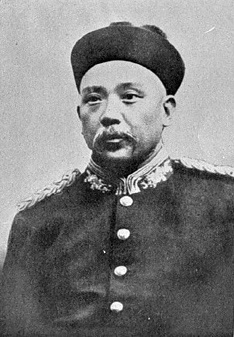
Yuan Shikai

Born in Anyang, Henan, Yuan was the grandson of Yuan Shikai, the second president of the Republic of China, via his third Korean concubine Lady Kim.

Yuan lived a simple middle class life during the early years, and his father Yuan Kewen was an intellectual who did not agree with his family's ambitions, especially that of his father. He criticized his father's seizure of power from Sun Zhongshan in a poem, “Pity that there are frequent storms up there; It is not wise to climb all the way to the top floor of a mansion.”

Yuan Kewen was under house arrest after the years he spent away from Beijing in Tianjin and Shanghai. During this time, the young Luke was raised by his mother in the then-provincial Anyang village in Henan.

Yuan would make trips with his mother, sister, and two brothers every New Year's Day to visit his Kewen's older brother Yuan Keding. Keding had the same views on power and politics as Yuan Shikai and required Luke to dress up formally and kowtow to him during every visit, which made Luke intimidated of him. The family had to depend on Luke's uncle Keding for financial support.

Luke studied in Anyang then at age 13, he went to Nankai High School in Tianjin for a month, but then transferred to The Academy of Modern Learning, run by a London-based missionary. Luke received a rather good science education there, with a Cambridge University educated Dr. Hart teaching physics, and his maternal uncle teaching mathematics. Luke matriculated at the College of Industry and Commerce in 1928 as a major in engineering.

He transferred to Yenching University in 1930, where the Chinese theoretical physicist Xie Yu-Ming was a professor. Luke's interest in radio led to radio communications as a serious hobby. He graduated in 1932, stayed in the graduate school for two more years, and received a master's degree. It was after graduation that Luke worked in Tangshan Coal Mine for one year. The President of Yenching University and later US Ambassador to China, Leighton Stuart, was also a radio communications hobbyist, and befriended Luke. Stuart knew of the scholarship at UC Berkeley and asked Luke if he was interested. This was the trigger for Luke's studying abroad in 1936.

After Yuan attended Yenching University in Beijing he would go to the University of California at Berkeley and the California Institute of Technology to study physics. He began living in the United States in 1936.

That same year, he attended the University of California, Berkeley and met renowned physicist Chien-Shiung Wu, whom he married in 1942. They were married at the home of Yuan's advisor Robert A. Millikan and his wife, with a Caltech instructor and priest officiating the wedding.

Since the physics department head Raymond Birge would not provide full scholarship grants to Yuan and Wu, Yuan transferred to Caltech, where he did his doctoral training under the Nobel laureate Millikan.

Wu frequently teased Yuan since her parents were rebel leaders who fought Yuan Shikai in the early days of the republic. She took part in the Manhattan Project and found a solution on Xenon-135 that allowed the B reactor to operate in order to build the atomic bomb. Wu also conducted the Wu Experiment which got her the Wolf Prize in Physics.

== Professional career ==
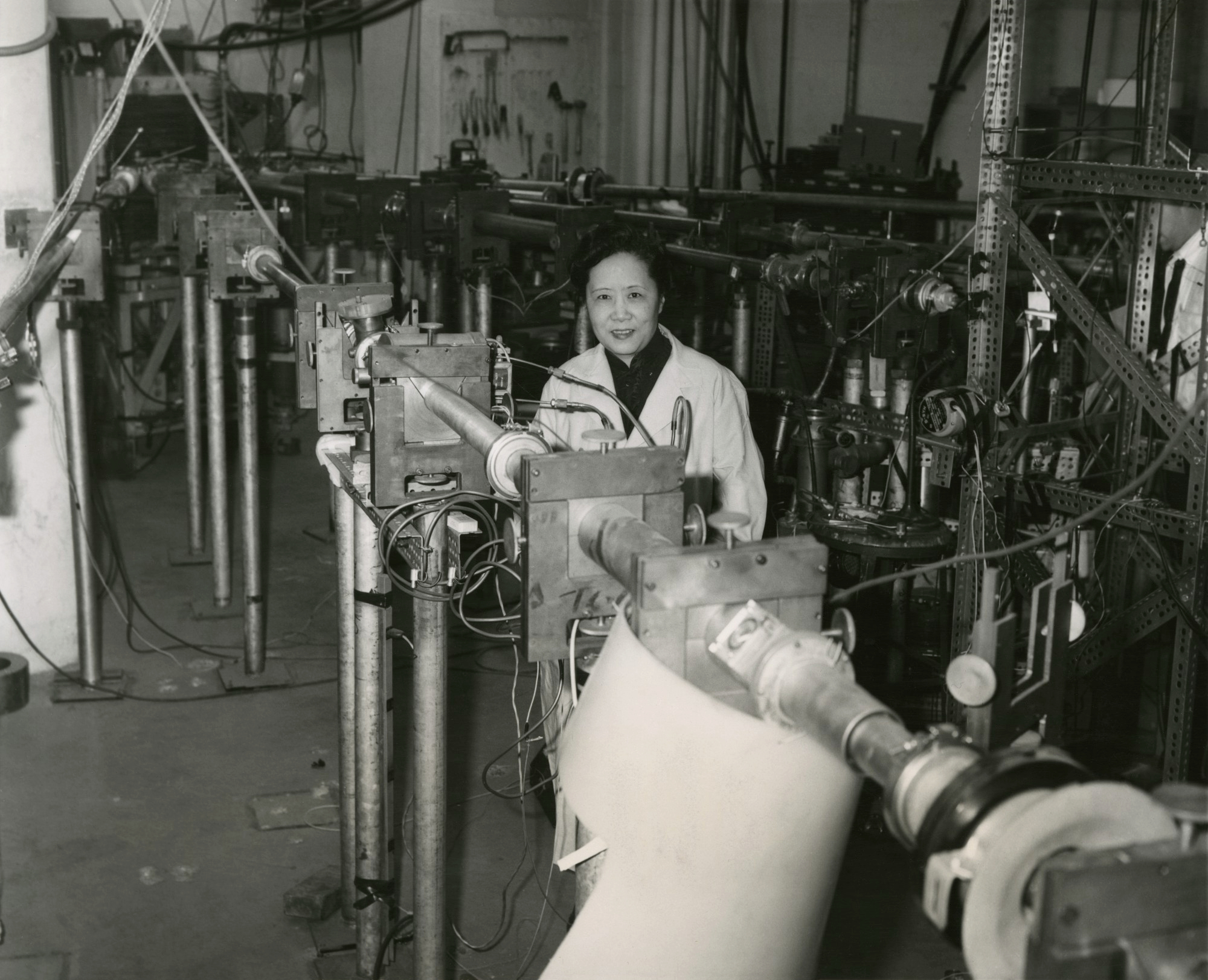
Chien-Shiung Wu was a particle and nuclear physicist who conducted experiments on beta decay, such as the Wu experiment.

Yuan worked at RCA Laboratories and then Brookhaven National Laboratory as a senior physicist and science educator. In 1958, he was awarded Guggenheim Fellowship for Natural Sciences. Yuan was elected a member of Academia Sinica the next year. He helped found the Synchrotron Radiation Research Center of Taiwan and Wu-Yuan Natural Science Foundation. Yuan would often travel to and from Brookhaven in Long Island, and on weekends return to the family's Manhattan home near Columbia University where Wu worked as its first female physics professor.

== Final years ==
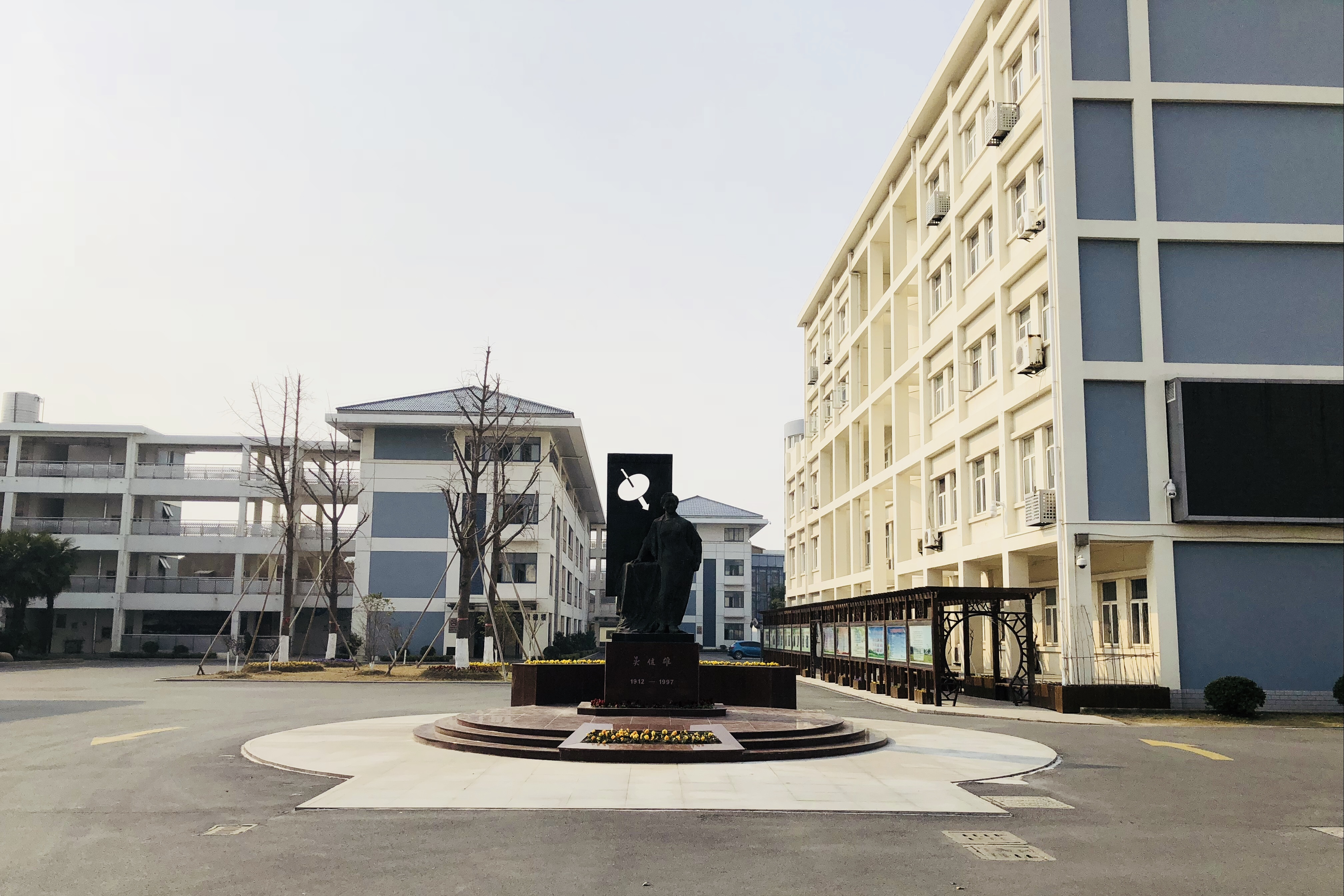
Statue of Wu in the campus of Ming De School, where Wu and Yuan are buried

Throughout Yuan's marriage, he would often spend time taking care of his son Vincent Yuan and the housework. Yuan learned to become adept at making Lion's head, chicken, sautéed vegetables, wonton, and many other dishes that the family cherished.

Both would attend numerous conventions and win multiple awards all over the world during their retirement. Six years after Wu died in New York, Yuan would spend more time in China. For over a year, Yuan was ill and died on February 11, 2003, in Beijing.

He is survived by his granddaughter, Jada Yuan or Wu Hanjie (a writer in New York City), son Vincent (nuclear physicist of New Mexico), and brother Yuan Jiaji of Tianjin.

Some of the things that he and his wife had were donated to the Cheng-Shiung Wu Memorial Hall, which is located in Nanjing, China. Both of their ashes were buried in front of the Mingde Middle School, where Wu studied as a child.
