= Yuan Kewen =

Chinese scholar and calligrapher

- 袁克文
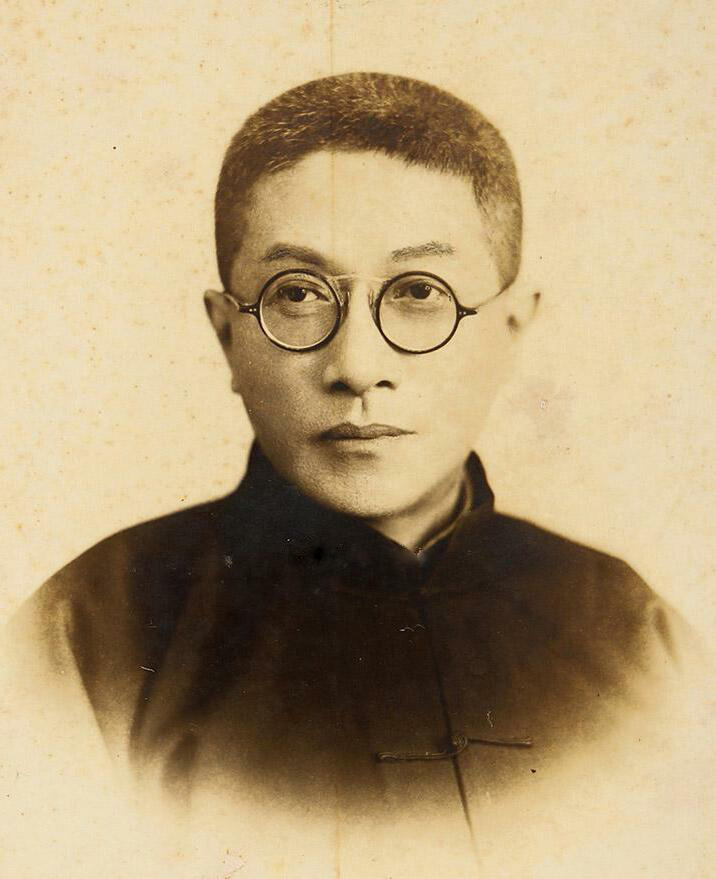
- Born: 16 July 1890; Hanseong, Kingdom of Joseon
- Died: March 22, 1931 (aged 40); Tianjin, Republic of China
- Occupation: Poet
- Children: 7, including Luke Chia-Liu Yuan
- Father: Yuan Shikai
- Relatives: Yuan Keding

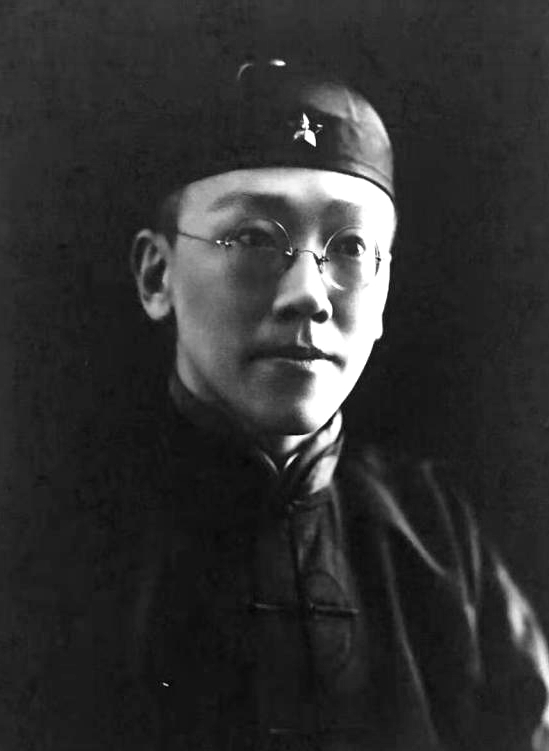
Yuan Kewen in his younger years

Yuan Kewen (Chinese: 袁克文; 16 July 1890 – 22 March 1931) was a Chinese scholar and calligrapher. Yuan's courtesy name was Baocen (豹岑). Yuan is also known by the sobriquet Hanyun (寒云).

== Early life ==
Yuan was born in 1890 in Hanseong (Seoul), Korea. His father was Yuan Shikai, a Chinese official who later became President of China (and briefly Emperor) in the 1910s. Yuan's Korean mother was Lady Gim (金氏), his father's third Korean concubine born in Hanseong, Korea. Yuan's elder brother was Prince Yuan Keding. Zhang Boju was Yuan Kewen's cousin and close friend.

== Career ==
Yuan was an expert of Chinese traditional literature and a master of calligraphy and Chinese ink painting. He excelled in poetry and lyrics and collected fine art and antiques. He was against his father's revival of the monarchy and also lived a promiscuous life, which irritated his father. Yuan fled to the foreign concession of Shanghai and joined a gang of thugs. He recruited many disciples in Shanghai and Tianjin.

He is also known for research on the card game Madiao. He wrote the book《雀谱》.

== Personal life ==
Yuan married Liu Meizhen (刘梅真). In addition to his wife, Yuan had five concubines, Qing Yunlou, Xiao Taohong, Tang Zhijun, Yu Peiwen, and Yaxian. Yuan also had numerous mistresses.

Yuan had four sons and three daughters, and all of them were scholars. Yuan's third son, Luke Chia-Liu Yuan (袁家騮, Yuan Jialiu), was a renowned high-energy physicist.

In 1931, Yuan died of a sudden illness. in Tianjin.

== See also ==
- Three perfections - integration of calligraphy, poetry and painting
