= Long Jiguang =

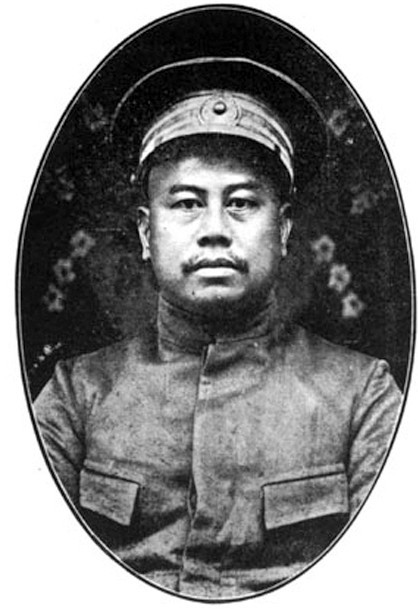
- Born: 1868 Yunnan Province, Qing Empire
- Died: March 12, 1925 (aged 56–57) Beijing, Republic of China
- Allegiance: Qing dynasty (Beiyang government) Republic of China; Empire of China
- Branch: Beiyang clique
- Rank: General
- Battles / wars: Xinhai Revolution; Second Revolution; National Protection War; Constitutional Protection War; Zhili–Anhui War
- Awards: Order of Rank and Merit

Long Jiguang
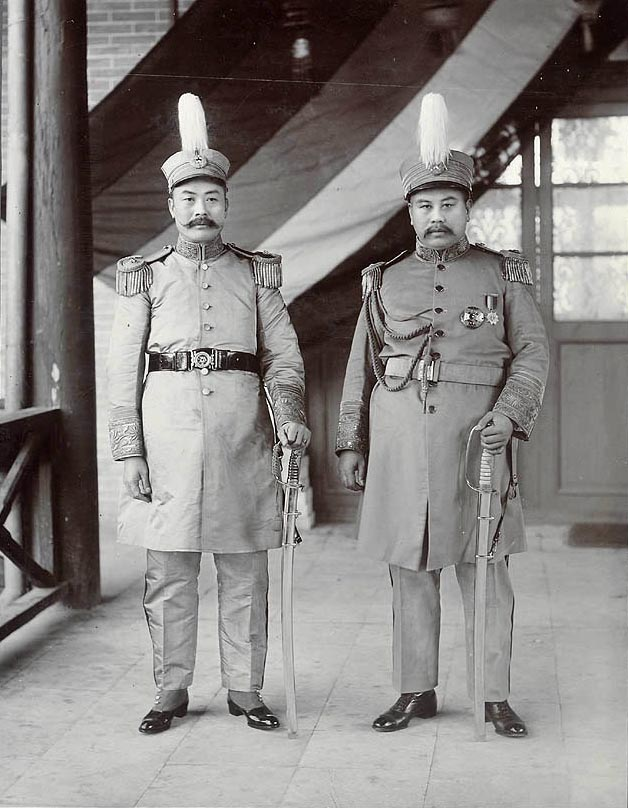
- Traditional Chinese: 龍濟光
- Simplified Chinese: 龙济光
Transcriptions
Standard Mandarin
- Hanyu Pinyin: Lóng Jìguāng

Long Jiguang (龍濟光) (1868–1925) was an ethnic Hani Chinese general of the late Qing and early Republican period of China.

== Biography ==
Long was born in 1868 in Yunnan. Long's older brother Jinguang (龍覲光) was also a general. Long served in the Guangdong army. He fought to suppress an anti-Qing rebellion by Republican revolutionaries in China. He was appointed governor of Guangdong in 1913 by Yuan Shikai. In 1916 he was removed from this post by Li Yuanhong and became commission of mining development on Hainan Island. After the fall of the Qing, he supported Yuan Shikai against Sun Yat-sen. After Yuan created the Empire of China, Long fought against the Guangxi warlords Lu Rongting and Li Liejun, who opposed Yuan's restoration of the monarchy. An opponent of the Constitutional Protection Movement, Long fled southern China to Beijing, where he supported Duan Qirui and the Anhui clique until their defeat in the Zhili–Anhui War. Long died in Beijing on the same day as Sun Yat-sen.

Ye Ju was one of his lieutenants.
