= Long Jinguang =

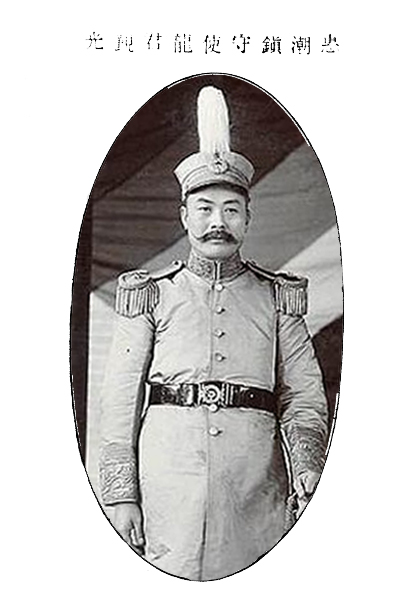
- Born: 1863; Yunnan, Qing dynasty
- Died: 1917 (aged 53–54); Beijing, Republic of China
- Allegiance: Qing Dynasty (Beiyang government) Republic of China; Empire of China

Long Jinguang (Chinese: 龙觐光) (1863 – 1917) was an ethnic Hani Chinese general of the late Qing and early Republican period of China. He was the older brother of Chinese general Long Jiguang. Both brothers supported Yuan Shikai's restoration of the monarchy.

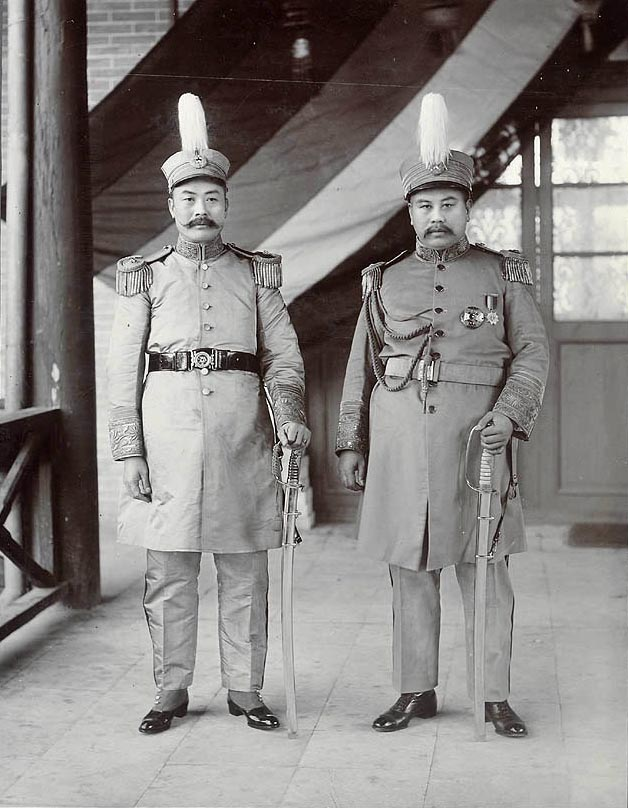
Long Jinguang (left) and Long Jiguang (right) at Guangzhou
