= General Lang =

General Lang may refer to:

- Derek Lang (1913−2001), British Army lieutenant general
- Frank C. Lang (1918–2008), U.S. Marine Corps major general
- Joachim-Friedrich Lang (1899–1945), German Heer major general
- Ross Lang (fl. 1760s–1780s), Madras Army lieutenant general
- Vaughn O. Lang (1927–2014), U.S. Army lieutenant general

== See also ==
- Henrik Lange (1908–2000), Swedish Coastal Artillery lieutenant general
- Wolfgang Lange (general) (1898–1988), German Wehrmacht lieutenant general
- General Long (disambiguation)
