= Minister of Communications =

Minister of Communications may refer to:

- Minister for Communications (Australia)
- Minister of Communications (Canada)
- Minister of Communications (India)
- Ministry of Communications (Israel)
- Ministry of Communications (Iceland)
- Ministry of Communications (Iraq)
- Ministry of Communications (Japan)
- Minister of Communications (Malaysia)
- Minister of Communications (South Africa)
- Ministry of Communications and Information, Singapore
- Minister for Culture, Communications and Sport, Ireland
- Ministry of Transportation and Communications (Taiwan)

== See also ==
- List of ministries of communications
