= Yuan Keding =

Eldest son of Yuan Shikai (1878–1958)

- 袁克定
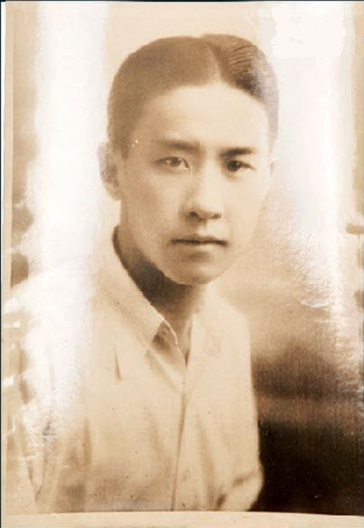

Personal details
- Born: December 20, 1878 Xiangcheng, Xiangcheng County, Henan, China
- Died: 1958 (aged 79–80) Beijing, China
- Children: Yuan Jiarong; Yuan Jia; Yuan Jiazao
- Parent(s): Yuan Shikai; Lady Yu
- Occupation: Crown Prince of China

Yuan Keding (Chinese: 袁克定; pinyin: Yuán Kèdìng; 20 December 1878 - 1958) courtesy name Yuntai (Chinese: 雲台) was the eldest son of Yuan Shikai and his first wife Yu. In 1915 when his father Yuan Shikai proclaimed himself Hongxian Emperor of the Empire of China, Yuan became crown prince as the Prince Yuntai. Yuan Kewen was his younger brother.

Yuan Keding was born in 1878 in Xiangcheng. In his childhood, Yuan followed his father to many places when he served in various positions in the Qing dynasty. He studied in Germany and spoke fluent German and English. At the end of the Qing dynasty, he served as a low-ranking official in the government. After the Xinhai Revolution, under the instruction of his father, Yuan became a close friend of Wang Jingwei. According to the History of Xinhai Revolution, Yuan and Wang swore to be "brothers of different surnames" in front of Yuan Shikai.

After the death of his father, Yuan lived reclusively in the German concession in Tianjin. In 1935, he moved to Baochao Lane (寶鈔衚衕) in Beijing. In 1937, he again relocated to Qinghuaxuan Villa in the Summer Palace. During the Sino-Japanese War, after the fall of Northern China, the Japanese army officer Kenji Doihara asked Yuan to join the Japanese puppet regimes, hoping to use his identity to exert some influence on the old Beiyang Ministry. Yuan refused to cooperate with the Imperial Japanese Army, as he did not wish to be seen as a traitor and his life became impoverished.

In 1948, due to poverty, Yuan turned to his cousin, Zhang Boju (張伯駒), and moved into Tsinghua Garden at Tsinghua University. Thanks to the help of Zhang Shizhao, after 1949, Yuan became a fellow of the Central Research Institute of Culture and History, and thus had a steady income.

== Personal life ==
Yuan had three children. His son Yuan Jiarong studied in the United States and majored in geology at Columbia University.

In 1958, Yuan died of illness in Beijing, China. Yuan was also an artist.
