= Yuan Shikai =

First president of the Republic of China (1859–1916)

Generalissimo Yuan Shikai
- 袁世凱
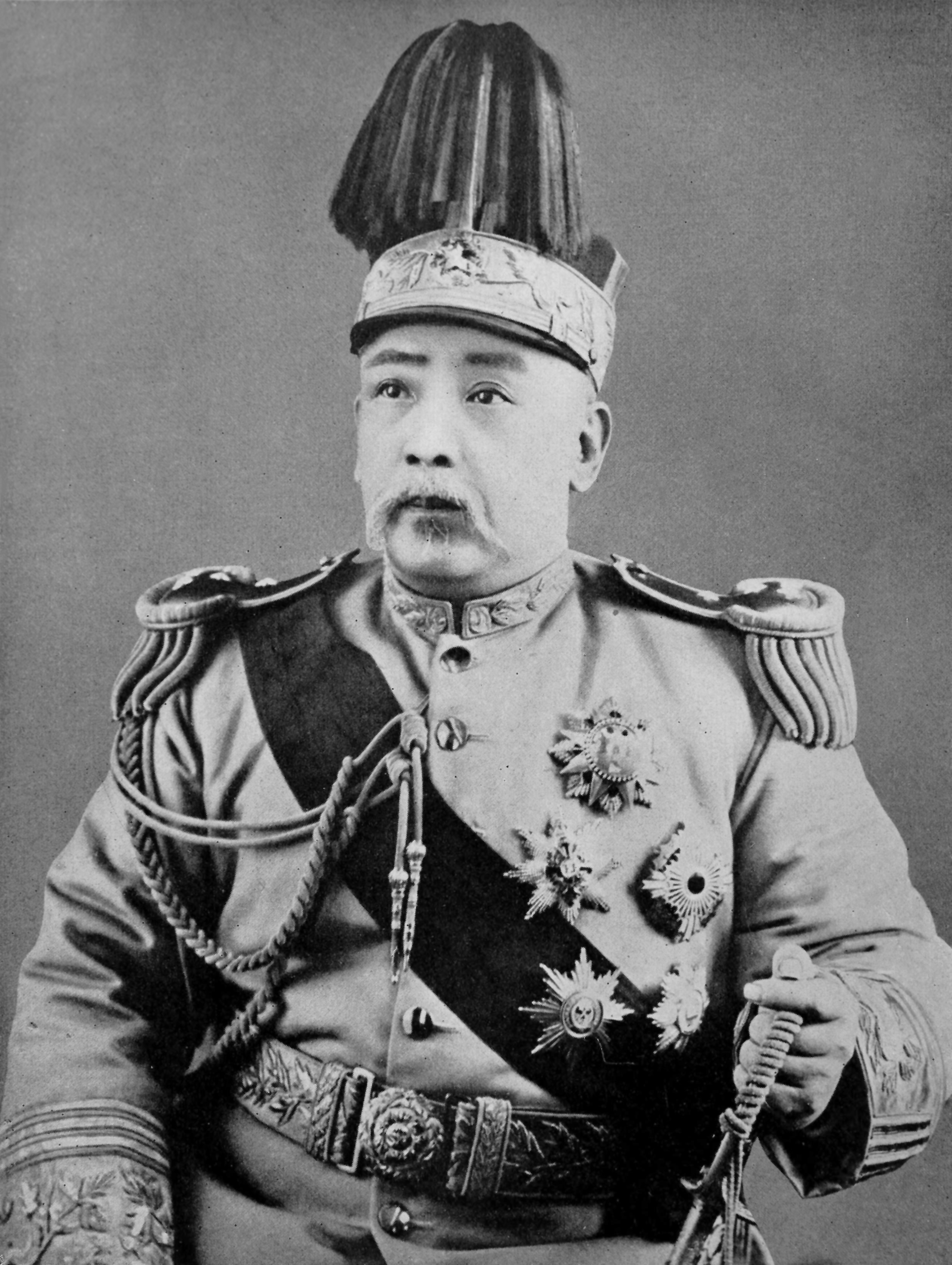
- Yuan in 1915

Emperor of China
- Reign; 12 December 1915 – 22 March 1916
- Prime Minister: Lu Zhengxiang

President of China
- In office 10 March 1912 – 6 June 1916
- Premier: Tang Shaoyi; Lu Zhengxiang; Zhao Bingjun; Duan Qirui (acting); Xiong Xiling; Sun Baoqi (acting); Xu Shichang; Duan Qirui
- Vice President: Li Yuanhong
- Preceded by: Sun Yat-sen
- Succeeded by: Li Yuanhong
Imperial offices
2nd Prime Minister of the Imperial Cabinet
In office 2 November 1911 – 10 March 1912
Monarch	Xuantong Emperor
Preceded by	Yikuang, Prince Qing
Succeeded by	Qing dynasty ended Zhang Xun (1917)
Grand Councillor
In office 4 September 1907 – 2 January 1909
Monarchs	Guangxu Emperor; Xuantong Emperor
Secretary of Foreign Affairs
In office 4 September 1907 – 2 January 1909
Monarchs	Guangxu Emperor; Xuantong Emperor
Preceded by	Lu Haihuan
Succeeded by	Liang Dunyan
Provincial offices
Viceroy of Zhili and Minister of Beiyang
In office 7 November 1901 – 4 September 1907
Monarch	Guangxu Emperor
Preceded by	Li Hongzhang
Succeeded by	Yang Shixiang
Governor of Shandong
In office 6 December 1899 – 7 November 1901
Monarch	Guangxu Emperor
Preceded by	Yuxian
Succeeded by	Zhang Renjun

Personal details
- Born: 16 September 1859 Zangying village, Xiangcheng, Henan, Qing Empire
- Died: 6 June 1916 (aged 56) Beijing, China
- Party: Beiyang clique; Republican Party
- Spouses: Yu Yishang; Lady Shen, concubine; Lady Lee, concubine; Lady Kim, concubine; Lady O, concubine; Lady Yang, concubine; Lady Ye, concubine; Lady Zhang, concubine; Lady Guo, concubine; Lady Liu, concubine
- Children: 17 sons; 15 daughters
- Occupation: General, politician
- Awards: Order of the Paulownia Flowers; Order of the Red Eagle

Military service
- Allegiance: Qing Dynasty (1881–1912); Republic of China (1912–1916); Empire of China (1915–1916)
- Branch/service: Beiyang Army
- Years of service: 1881–1916
- Rank: Generalissimo
- Battles/wars: Imo Incident; Kapsin Coup; First Sino-Japanese War; Boxer Rebellion; Xinhai Revolution; Second Revolution; Bai Lang Rebellion; National Protection War

Yuan Shikai
- Traditional Chinese: 袁世凱
- Simplified Chinese: 袁世凯
Transcriptions
Standard Mandarin
- Hanyu Pinyin: Yuán Shìkǎi
- Bopomofo: ㄩㄢˊ ㄕˋ ㄎㄞˇ
- Gwoyeu Romatzyh: Yuan Shyhkae
- Wade–Giles: Yüan^{2} Shih^{4}-kʻai^{3}
- Tongyong Pinyin: Yuán Shìh-kǎi
- IPA: [ɥɛ̌n ʂɻ̩̂.kʰàɪ]
other Mandarin
- Xiao'erjing: يُوَن شِكَےْ
Yue: Cantonese
- Yale Romanization: Yùhn Sai-hói
- Jyutping: jyun4 sai3 hoi2
- IPA: [jyn˩ sɐj˧ hɔj˧˥]
Southern Min
- Tâi-lô: Uân Sì-khái

Courtesy name
- Traditional Chinese: 慰亭
- Simplified Chinese: 慰亭
Transcriptions
Standard Mandarin
- Hanyu Pinyin: Wèitíng
- Bopomofo: ㄨㄟˋ ㄊㄧㄥˊ
- Gwoyeu Romatzyh: Weytyng
- Wade–Giles: Wei^{4}-tʻing^{2}
- Tongyong Pinyin: Wèi-tíng
- IPA: [wêɪ.tʰǐŋ]
other Mandarin
- Xiao'erjing: وےْتٍڭ
Yue: Cantonese
- Yale Romanization: Wai-tìhng
- Jyutping: wai3 ting4
- IPA: [wɐj˧ tʰɪŋ˩]

Yuan Shikai (traditional Chinese: 袁世凱; simplified Chinese: 袁世凯; pinyin: Yuán Shìkǎi; Wade–Giles: Yüan² Shih⁴-k'ai³; 16 September 1859 – 6 June 1916) was a Chinese general and statesman. As leader of the Beiyang Army, he played a decisive role in securing the abdication of the Qing court. He served as the second provisional president and the first formal president of the Republic of China, with his administration known as the Beiyang government. He declared himself Emperor of the Chinese Empire in December 1915 but was forced to abdicate in March 1916.

Born to an affluent Han family in Xiangcheng county, Yuan failed the imperial examinations in his early years and instead joined the Huai Army, with which he was stationed in Joseon (Korea) in 1882. He was appointed imperial resident and supreme adviser to the Korean government after thwarting the Kapsin Coup in 1885. He was recalled to China in 1894 and tasked with training of the New Army the next year, which laid the foundation for his Beiyang Army. Yuan joined a reformist society and played an active role in both the Self-Strengthening Movement and the late Qing reforms, including the abolition of the imperial examination system in favor of modern education. However, the Hundred Days' Reformists accused him of betrayal for tipping Ronglu off to their coup plan, which brought Yuan into Empress Dowager Cixi's favor. Promoted to Viceroy of Zhili in 1902, Yuan expanded the Beiyang Army into the best trained and most effective military force in China. Upon Cixi's death, he was dismissed by Prince Regent Zaifeng.

Following the Wuchang Uprising in October 1911, the Qing court recalled Yuan from retirement and appointed him Prime Minister of the Imperial Cabinet. Yuan's Beiyang Army engaged in brief fighting with Sun Yat-sen's revolutionaries before opening negotiations, brokering a deal whereby Sun would step aside in Yuan's favor if Yuan secured the abdication of the Qing court. As a result, Yuan was elected provisional president of the Republic of China, before he became the president.

In 1913, Yuan's alleged involvement in the assassination of Song Jiaoren and the reorganisation loan affair provoked Sun Yat-sen's Second Revolution, which was decisively crushed. He then outlawed the Kuomintang, dissolved the National Assembly, and replaced the provisional constitution. In December 1915, Yuan proclaimed himself Hongxian Emperor (洪憲), provoking the National Protection War. In March 1916, faced with widespread opposition to his monarchy, Yuan abdicated and restored the Republic, having been emperor for only 83 days. He died of kidney failure in June at the age of 56, leaving behind a significantly weakened Beiyang government and a fragmented political landscape, which soon plunged China into a period of warlordism.

== Early life ==
On 16 September 1859, Yuan was born in the village of Zhangying (張營村) to the Yuan Clan which later moved 16 kilometres southeast of Xiangcheng to a hilly area that was easier to defend against bandits. There, the Yuan family had built the fortified village of Yuanzhaicun (袁寨村). He was the fourth of six sons, and in 1866 was adopted by his father's younger brother, until he died in 1873. From that point Yuan was raised by several other uncles, before returning to Xiangcheng in 1878. During those years he had lived in the province of Shandong, and then in Nanjing and Beijing. Yuan's family was affluent enough to provide Yuan with a traditional Confucian education. As a young man he enjoyed riding, hunting with dogs, boxing, and entertainment with friends. Though hoping to pursue a career in the civil service, he failed the imperial examinations twice, in 1876 and 1879, leading him to decide on an entry into politics through the Huai Army, where many of his relatives served. His career began with the purchase of a minor official title in 1880, which was a common method of official promotion in the late Qing.

Between 1877 and 1878, Yuan accompanied one of his uncles who was sent to assist relief efforts after a drought in the province of Henan, and Yuan was praised by officials there for his role in helping manage the response, including in punishing those who embezzled relief funds. It was during that time that he began learning about leadership and politics, and made connections with senior government officials. After seeing the conditions in Henan as a result of the natural disaster there, Yuan wrote that he wanted to dedicate himself to "serving the country". Using his father's connections, Yuan traveled to Tengzhou, Shandong, and received a post on the military staff of the commander of the province's coastal defenses, Wu Changching, in 1881. Wu had owed a debt to Yuan's foster father, and also provided Yuan with tutors to help him study for another attempt at the imperial examination. Yuan planned to retake it, but this never happened because his deployment to Korea in 1882. Around this time he expressed his willingness to fight to defend China from foreign powers. Yuan's interest in military history and martials arts made him want to join the army, though he was disillusioned when he saw how poorly the soldiers were paid. Yuan's first marriage was in 1876 to a woman of the Yu family who bore him a first son, Keding, in 1878. Yuan married nine more concubines throughout the course of his life.

== Years in Joseon ==
In the early 1870s, Korea under the Joseon dynasty was in the midst of a struggle between isolationists under King Gojong's father Heungseon Daewongun, and progressives, led by Empress Myeongseong, who wanted to open trade. After the Meiji Restoration, Japan had adopted an aggressive foreign policy, contesting Chinese domination of the peninsula. Under the Treaty of Ganghwa, which the Koreans signed with reluctance in 1876, Japan was allowed to send diplomatic missions to Hanseong, and opened trading posts in Incheon and Wonsan. Amidst an internal power struggle in 1882 which resulted in the queen's exile, the Viceroy of Zhili, Li Hongzhang, sent 3,000 men of the Huai Army under Wu Changqing into Korea to restore stability, which became Yuan's first military deployment. Yuan distinguished himself during his service on Wu's staff in Korea, including both in battle and in his administrative ability, and was recommended for promotion to the rank of subprefect by Wu. Yuan also became known for enforcing strict discipline among the Chinese troops in Korea. In the spring of 1884, after Wu returned to China, Yuan became the commander of the Chinese forces in his place. The Korean king proposed that some of his troops be trained by the Chinese, and Yuan was put in charge of training the Korean royal guard, as the head of a new Capital Guard Command.

China's reassertion of suzerainty over Korea aggravated the split between pro-Japanese Korean progressives and pro-Chinese conservatives. In December 1884 the progressives attempted to form a new government with Japanese backing during the Kapsin Coup, and the conservatives led by Queen Min turned to the Chinese garrison for help. Yuan led his troops to defeat the outnumbered Japanese and recover King Gojong. The 26-year-old Yuan established himself as a resourceful leader, and from that point Viceroy Li Hongzhang gave him a critical role in regaining Chinese control of Korea. In October 1885, Yuan was appointed Chinese imperial resident in Korea by Li, restoring a custom that dated back to the Mongol Yuan dynasty. Yuan spent the next nine years in that position and operated as if he were above the law. He ended any attempts at reform, changed the composition of the Korean government, and worked to minimize any other foreign influence, especially Japanese. Yuan was allied to the corrupt Min oligarchy, and historians have characterized his reign in Korea as a "dark age". His behavior and rule created a lot of antagonism against him and China among Koreans. However, during those years China was able to maintain its control over Korea and contain Japanese and Russian influence. He wanted to remove Gojong from the throne on several occasions, but was prevented from doing so by Li Hongzhang.

In the early 1890s, the Japanese protested that China was obstructing Japan's trade with Korea, but more importantly a rebel movement that threatened Chinese interests, the Donghak Society, emerged in the Korean countryside. It existed for many years and held sporadic protests against corruption and foreign influence, but in early 1894 it had spread rapidly in opposition to the government's taxation policy. The rebels agreed to a ceasefire on 1 June 1894 to remove any pretext for foreign intervention, and on 2 June the Japanese cabinet decided to deploy troops to Korea only if China did so. The Min faction, not being aware of the latter and feeling threatened by the rebels, requested China to send reinforcements on 3 June. They were also advised in this by Yuan. Japan started military preparations immediately. Within days, over 2,000 Japanese troops landed in Korea and marched to Seoul, and additional troops and warships arrived during the following weeks. They quickly outnumbered the Chinese force in Korea. Yuan requested Li Hongzhang for permission to leave Korea in late June, but this was not granted for twenty days, and he left Seoul on 19 July by disguising himself as a Chinese servant of the Russian military attaché on his way to Beijing. This ended his twelve years in Korea.

Yuan had three Korean concubines, one of whom was Korean Princess Li's relative, concubine Kim. 15 of Yuan's children came from these three Korean women.

== Late Qing dynasty ==
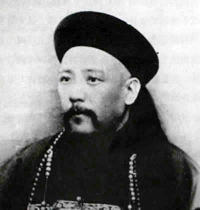
Yuan as Governor of Shandong

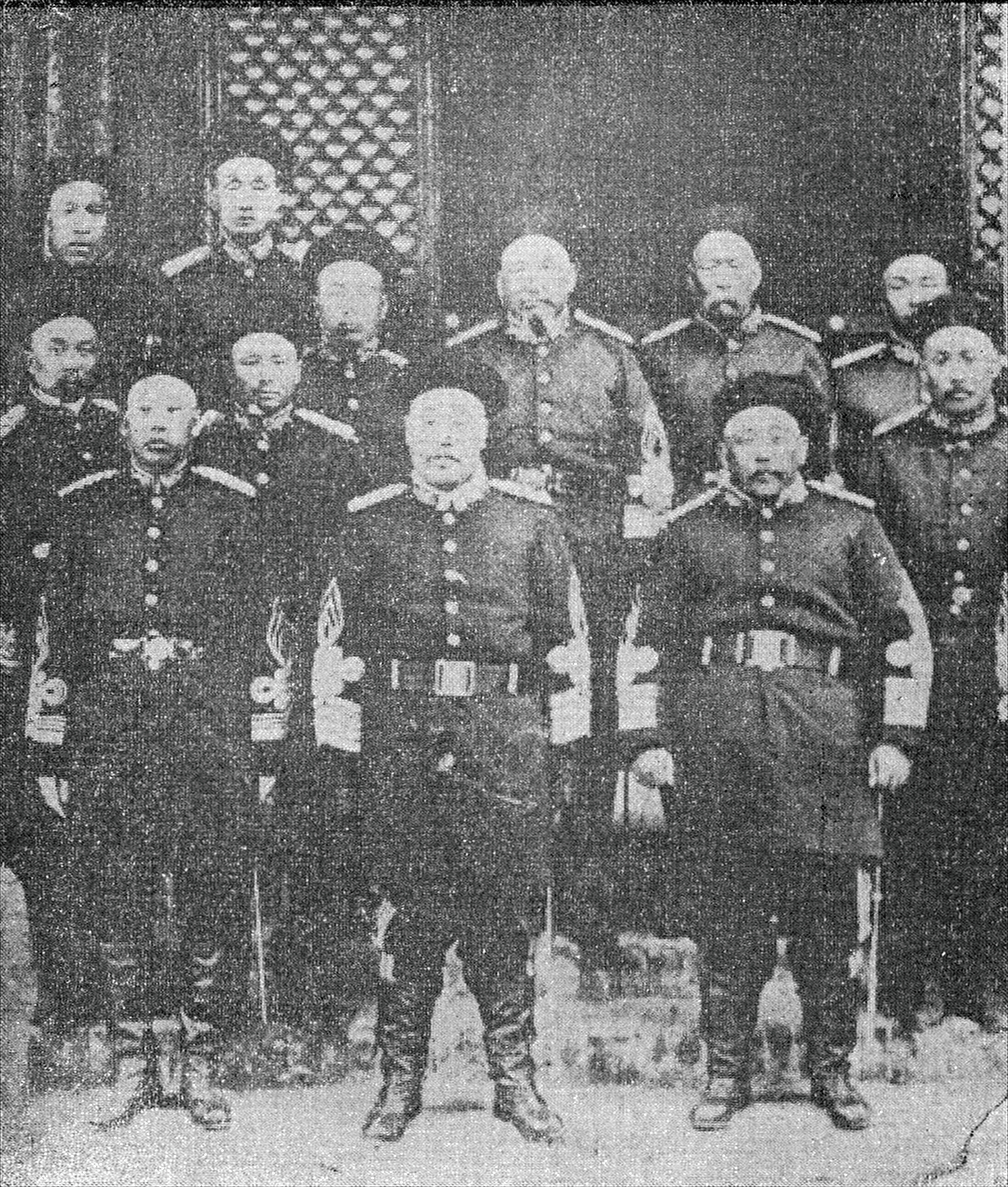
Yuan and Tieliang（铁良) in 1906

After returning to China, Yuan was appointed to a post in Zhejiang, but he did not take it up. The First Sino-Japanese War officially began on 1 August 1894 with Japan declaring war on China, and he spent the conflict assisting with the provision of supplies to the Chinese forces in Korea and northeast China, at the request of Li Hongzhang. At this point Yuan also had a positive reputation outside of China, due to his actions in Korea. Japanese Prime Minister Itō Hirobumi had asked Li Hongzhang about Yuan during their negotiations at the end of the war, and remarked that he was talented. Shortly before the Treaty of Shimonoseki ended the Sino-Japanese war in April 1895, U.S. Secretary of State John W. Foster attempted to convince Yuan to lead a military coup against the Qing dynasty.

After China's best force, the Huai Army, had been defeated in the war with Japan, the Qing court was willing to create units that were organized entirely along the European model. There were increasing calls after the war to reorganize the Chinese armed forces. Around this time, Yuan had the confidence of senior Qing officials, including Ronglu, the Minister of War, and Yikuang, Prince Qing. Several high-ranking officials, including Yikuang, Weng Tonghe, and Wang Wenshao, signed memorials to the throne in the fall of 1895 asking the Guangxu Emperor to appoint Yuan to oversee military modernization. He was known for having organized Korean forces, defeating the Japanese during the 1880s, and displaying management skills as a logistics officer during the most recent war. After a private meeting with the emperor on 2 August 1895 he was made a member of the council for military issues. Within days, he presented the emperor with a lengthy document on his proposal for creating a Western-style army under centralized Qing control. On 8 December 1895 Yuan was appointed as the commander of the New Army, which was created on the basis of the Pacification Army that had been raised during the war at the Huai Army training camp in Xiaozhan, near Tianjin.

Yuan immediately set about organizing the brigade-sized New Army, and spent the next three years developing a force at Xiaozhan that was different from any previous Chinese military, being not only equipped but also organized along the lines of the German Army, and funded by the central government. Particular attention was given to the recruitment and training of the soldiers and officers. It was organized into combat arms and several technical branches, and a staff officer system was also set up with German assistance. The unit was equipped with German weapons and supplies. The New Army became the basis for his rise to power, and in addition to Yuan, the brigade's officer corps included many other future leaders, including several presidents of the Republic of China and provincial governors. Already in 1896, Yuan's troops received praise from Ronglu, and in July 1897 Yuan was made provincial chief justice of Zhili.

The Qing court at the time was divided between progressives under the leadership of the Guangxu Emperor and conservatives under Empress Dowager Cixi, who had withdrawn to her Summer Palace and allowed the emperor to lead the government. Between 1895 and 1898 the emperor, in want of military support for his reform efforts, had several meetings with Yuan, who was a member of Society for the Study of National Strengthening, a reformist group initiated by Kang Youwei in response to China's defeat in the First Sino-Japanese War. At the same Yuan maintained good relations with the conservative Manchu princes, notably Ronglu. In June 1898 the Guangxu Emperor launched the Hundred Days' Reform and started issuing dozens of edicts to make changes to China's culture, economy, military, and education system, with the support of reformists such as Kang Youwei and Liang Qichao. He encountered a lot of resistance from the conservatives, who wanted Cixi to return, and his supporters, having no military power of their own, decided to ask Yuan for help.

Yuan's role during the events continues to be debated by historians. The generally accepted facts are that the reformist Tan Sitong met with Yuan in Beijing on 18 September 1898, soliciting military assistance for a coup plan to control or assassinate Ronglu and Cixi. Yuan betrayed the reformists by informing Ronglu of the plot in Tianjin. On the morning of 21 September, Cixi launched a coup that ended the Hundred Days' Reform and placed the Guangxu Emperor under house arrest.

The more contested aspects concern the timing, causes, and consequences of Yuan’s disclosure. According to his diary, written shortly after the events and published posthumously by his secretary Zhang Yilin, Yuan visited Ronglu on 20 September but did not reveal the reformists’ plot until the following morning, around the same time as—or even after—Cixi’s coup; they only learned of her coup that night. The traditionally prevailing view, however, holds that Yuan disclosed everything on 20 September, that Ronglu traveled to the Summer Palace to inform Cixi that same night, and that she returned to the Forbidden City the following morning to launch a preemptive crackdown. Yuan's conversation with Ronglu has therefore been cited as the cause of the reform's failure. More recent evidence has led some scholars to conclude that Cixi’s crackdown had already been planned before Yuan’s meeting with Ronglu, or even that news of her coup caused Yuan to confess on the night of 21 September, fearing that he might be implicated by the reformists. Nevertheless, Yuan’s report to Ronglu is generally credited with sealing Tan Sitong’s fate: Tan’s name did not appear in the initial arrest order on the morning of 21 September, but he was arrested that night, suggesting that Cixi had not initially been aware of his role in the plot.

Yuan was appointed as acting Viceroy of Zhili and Beiyang Trade Minister for ten days after the coup, which may have been an effort by the conservative faction to keep him away from his troops at Xiaozhan. Ronglu saw Yuan as reliable subordinate and his support allowed Yuan to not be punished, unlike the other reformers. Later that year several military units in northern China were placed under Ronglu's command as the Wuwei Corps, which also called the Guards Army. Yuan's New Army became the Right Division of the Guard Army. It was seen as the best trained and equipped among the five divisions of the army, and his success opened the way for his rise to the top in both military and political sectors. During 1899 he wrote several proposals to the Qing court in military reform. In June 1899, he was made the junior vice president of the Ministry of Works by Empress Dowager Cixi.

As tensions increased between the locals and foreigners in the province of Shandong, beginning the Boxer Rebellion, Yuan was sent there in December 1899 as the acting provincial governor. He was confirmed as governor in March 1900. Yuan ensured the suppression of Boxers in the province, though his troops took no active part outside Shandong itself. Yuan took the side of the pro-foreign faction in the imperial court. He refused to side with the Boxers and attack the Eight-Nation Alliance forces, joining with other Chinese governors who commanded substantial modernized armies like Zhang Zhidong not participating in the Boxer Rebellion. He and Zhang ignored Cixi's declaration of war against the foreign powers and continued to suppress the Boxers. This clique was known as the Mutual Defence Pact of Southeast China. In addition to suppressing the Boxers in Shandong, Yuan and his army (the Right Division) also helped the Eight-Nation Alliance suppress them in Zhili after captured Peking in August 1900. Yuan's forces massacred tens of thousands of people in their anti-Boxer campaign in Zhili. Yuan operated out of Baoding during the campaign, which ended in 1902. The Boxer Rebellion decimated the other divisions of the Guards Army, and after it was over the Qing court wanted rebuild the defenses of the Beijing area, appointing Yuan to oversee this task. In late 1901 he was made the acting Viceroy of Zhili and Beiyang Trade Minister after the death of Li Hongzhang, so he was also in charge of the foreign and military affairs of northern China. These appointments to powerful positions in the capital region showed the trust that the empress dowager had in Yuan. He was confirmed as viceroy in June 1902. Yuan was given several other offices around that time, including as director of the northern railways and director of telegraphs.

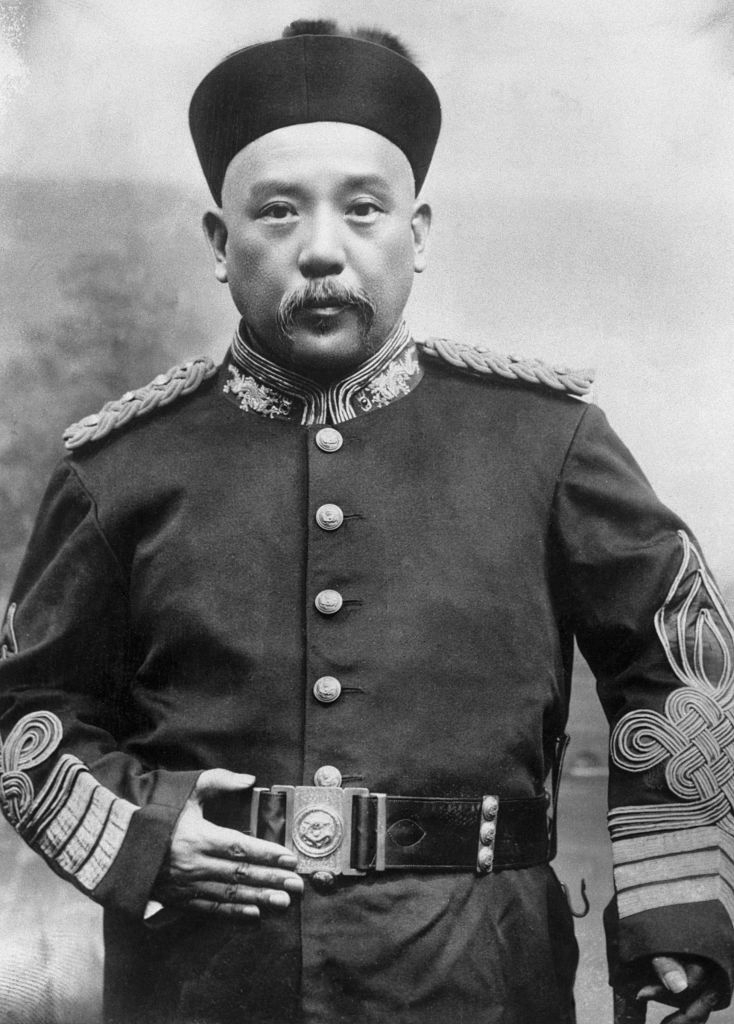
Yuan in Qing dynasty uniform, 1912

Enjoying the trust of Empress Dowager Cixi, as the Viceroy of Zhili and Beiyang Trade Minister, Yuan was in a position that allowed him to expand his army and increase its funding. It was at this time that Yuan established the Beiyang Army, with the creation of the Left Division of the Beiyang Standing Army in October 1902. In December 1902 he was also ordered to train several thousand Manchu Bannermen, and these later became the 1st Division of the Beiyang Army, while the Left Division was renamed the 2nd Division. It was meant to become the core of a Chinese regular army, and although Yuan had a lot of influence over it, the central government had administrative control and provided the army's funding. In 1904 Yuan used the Russo-Japanese War to convince Cixi to authorize the creation of more divisions. Because of this the Beiyang Army reached a strength of 60,000 men. In mid-1902 he established a military staff to assist him in his role as Beiyang Army commander, and its two most prominent members were Feng Guozhang and Duan Qirui. The "Beiyang clique" became the origin of the majority of warlords in northern China during the warlord period in the 1910s and 1920s. As one historian wrote, "the [Beiyang] Army was the most significant military development in China between the [Xiang] and Huai Armies which suppressed the Taiping and [Nian] rebellions in the 1860's and the army that Chiang Kai-shek raised and employed in the northern expedition of 1926-27."

In 1905, acting on Yuan's advice, Dowager Empress Cixi issued a decree ending the traditional Confucian examination system that was formalized in 1906. She ordered the Ministry of Education to implement a system of primary and secondary schools and universities with state-mandated curriculum, modelled after the educational system of Meiji-era Japan. On 27 August 1908, the Qing court promulgated "Principles for a Constitution", which Yuan helped to draft. This document called for a constitutional government with a strong monarchy (modelled after Meiji Japan and Bismarck's Germany), with a constitution to be issued by 1916 and an elected parliament by 1917.

Yuan's Han-dominated New Army was primarily responsible for the defence of Beijing, as most of the modernized Eight Banner divisions were destroyed in the Boxer Rebellion and the new modernized Banner forces were token in nature.

The Empress Dowager and the Guangxu Emperor died within a day of each other in November 1908. Unofficial sources indicate that the will of the emperor ordered Yuan's execution. Nonetheless, he avoided death. In January 1909, Yuan was relieved of all his posts by the new regent, Prince Chun, who intended to consolidate power of the Manchu imperial family, though Prince Chun decided against his originally harsh dismissal decree and dropped any wording that would have permanently barred Yuan from future office; the official edict cited Yuan's resignation on grounds of a foot ailment, allowing him to retire to his home village of Huanshang (洹上村) in Anyang.

During his three years of effective exile, Yuan kept contact with his allies, including Duan Qirui, who reported to him regularly about army proceedings. Yuan had arranged for the marriage of his niece (whom he had adopted) to Duan as a means to consolidate power. The loyalty of the Beiyang Army was still behind him. Having this strategic military support, Yuan held the balance of power between various revolutionaries, like Sun Yat-sen, and the Qing court. Both wanted Yuan on their side.

== 1911 Revolution ==
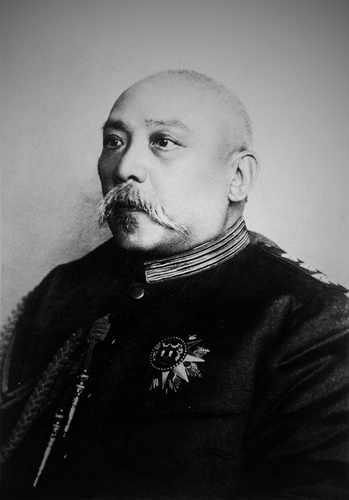
Yuan in uniform

The Wuchang Uprising took place on 10 October 1911 in Hubei province. The southern provinces subsequently declared their independence from the Qing court, but neither the northern provinces nor the Beiyang Army had a clear stance for or against the rebellion. Both the Qing court and Yuan were fully aware that the Beiyang Army was the only Qing force powerful enough to quell the revolutionaries. The court requested Yuan's return on 27 October, but he repeatedly declined offers from the Qing court for his return, first as the Viceroy of Huguang, and then as Prime Minister of the Imperial Cabinet. Time was on Yuan's side, and Yuan waited, using his "foot ailment" as a pretext to his continual refusal.

After further pleas by the Qing court, Yuan agreed and eventually left his village for Beijing on 30 October, becoming prime minister on 1 November 1911. Immediately after that he asked the regent to withdraw from politics, which forced Zaifeng to resign as regent. This made way for Yuan to form a new, predominantly Han cabinet of confidants, with only one Manchu as Minister of Suzerainty. To further reward Yuan's loyalty to the court, the Empress Dowager Longyu offered Yuan the noble title Marquis of the First Rank (一等侯), an honour previously given only to 19th-century General Zeng Guofan for his raising of the Xiang Army to suppress the Taiping Rebellion.

Meanwhile, Yuan courted Wang Jingwei, a Tongmenghui member who was just released by the Qing court in an amnesty of political prisoners to appease the rebels, and arranged for Wang and Yuan Keding to become sworn brothers. Through Wang, a close associate of Sun Yat-sen, Yuan established a foothold among the revolutionaries, who had likewise long sought to win him over. Soon, in the Battle of Yangxia, Yuan's forces recaptured Hankou and Hanyang from the revolutionaries. As a complete suppression of the revolution would end his usefulness to the Qing regime, instead of attacking Wuchang, Yuan invited the revolutionaries to the negotiating table.

In the hunting-park, three miles to the south of Peking, is quartered the Sixth Division, which supplies the Guards for the Imperial Palace, consisting of a battalion of infantry and a squadron of cavalry. With this Division Yuan Shi Kai retains twenty-six modified Krupp guns, which are the best of his artillery arm, and excel any guns possessed by the foreign legations in Peking.

The Manchu Division moves with the Court and is the pride of the modern army.

By his strategic disposition Yuan Shi Kai completely controls all the approaches to the capital, and holds a force which he may utilize either to protect the Court from threatened attack or to crush the Emperor should he himself desire to assume Imperial power. Contrary to treaty stipulations made at the settlement of the Boxer trouble, the Chinese have been permitted to build a great tower over the Chien Men, or central southern gate, which commands the foreign legations and governs the Forbidden City. In the threatening condition of Chinese affairs it might be assumed that this structure had been undermined by the foreign community, but this has not been done, and if trouble again arise in Peking the fate of the legations will depend upon the success of the first assault which will be necessary to take it. The foreign legations are as much in the power of Yuan Shi Kai's troops in 1907 as they were at the mercy of the Chinese rabble in 1900.

The ultimate purpose of the equipped and disciplined troops is locked in the breast of the Viceroy of Chihli. Yuan Shi Kai's yamen in Tientsin is connected by telegraph and telephone with the Imperial palaces and with the various barracks of his troops. In a field a couple of hundred yards away is the long pole of a wireless telegraph station, from which he can send the message that any day may set all China ablaze.

— To-morrow in the East, Douglas Story, pp. 224–226.

=== Abdication of child emperor ===
The revolutionaries had elected Sun Yat-sen as the first Provisional President of the Republic of China, but they were in a weak position militarily, so they negotiated with Yuan, the pivotal figure upon whom the fate of the Qing dynasty depended. Yuan arranged for the abdication of the child emperor Puyi in return for the position of President of the Republic of China. Puyi, then 5, described in his autobiography the meeting between Longyu and Yuan:

The Dowager Empress was sitting on a kang [platform] in a side room of the Mind Nature Palace, wiping her eyes with a handkerchief as a fat old man [Yuan] knelt before her on a red cushion, tears streaming down his face. I was sitting to the right of the widow and wondering why both adults were crying. There was no one in the room other than the three of us and everything was very quiet; the fat man snorted as he spoke and I couldn't understand what he was saying ... This was the time when Yuan directly raised the question of abdication.

Sun agreed to Yuan's presidency after some internal bickering, but asked that the capital be situated in Nanjing. Yuan, however, wanted the geographic advantage of having the nation's capital close to his base of military power. Many theorized that Cao Kun, one of his trusted subordinate Beiyang military commanders, fabricated a coup d'état in Beijing and Tianjin, apparently under Yuan's orders, to provide an excuse for Yuan not to leave his sphere of influence in Zhili. However, the claim that the coup was organized by Yuan has been challenged by others. The revolutionaries compromised again, and the capital of the new republic was established in Beijing. Yuan was elected Provisional President of the Republic of China by the Nanjing Provisional Senate on 15 February 1912, and sworn in on 10 March of that year.

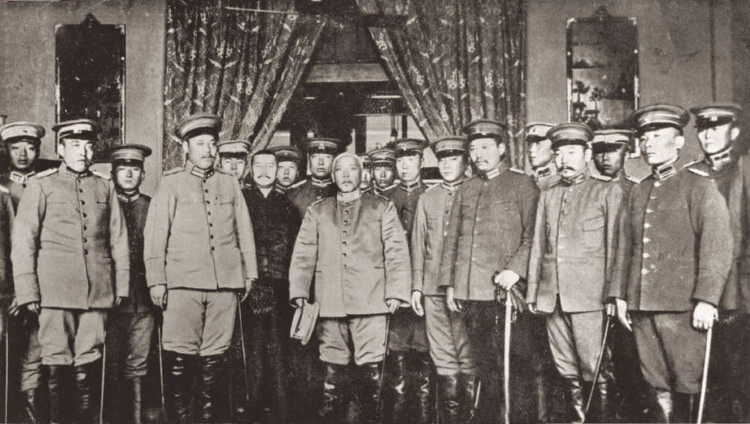
Yuan sworn in as Provisional President of the Republic of China, in Beijing, 10 March 1912

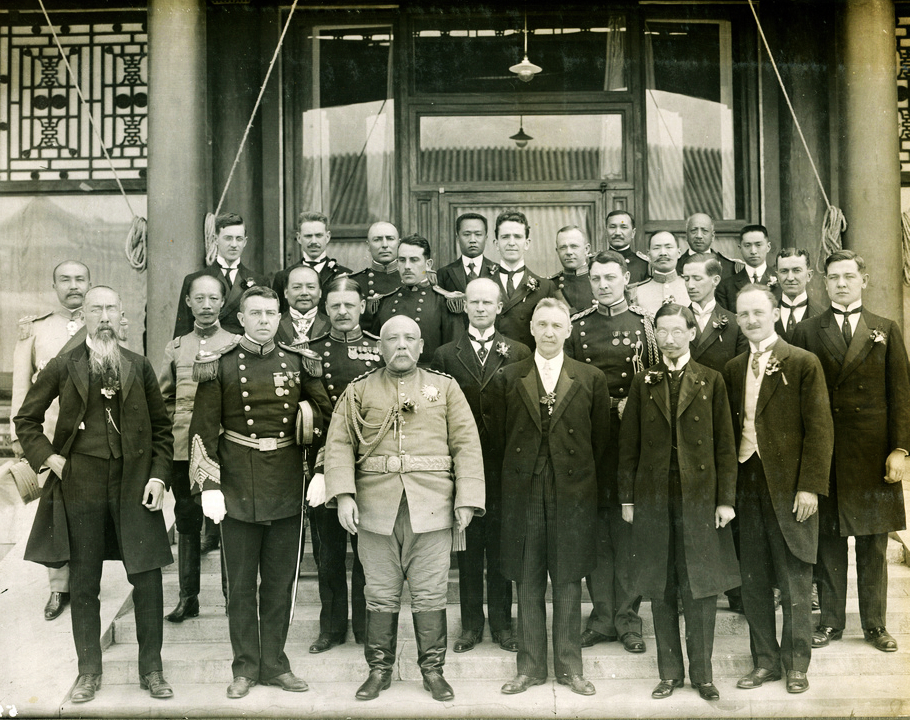
Yuan pictured with ambassadors from foreign countries on 10 October 1913

=== Democratic elections ===
In February 1913, democratic elections were held for the National Assembly in which the KMT scored a significant victory. Song Jiaoren zealously supported a cabinet system and was widely regarded as a candidate for prime minister.

One of Song's main political goals was to ensure that the powers and independence of China's Parliament be properly protected from the influence of the office of the president. Song's goals in curtailing the office of the president conflicted with the interests of Yuan, who, by mid-1912, clearly dominated the provisional cabinet and was showing signs of a desire to hold overwhelming executive power. During Song's travels through China in 1912, he had openly and vehemently expressed the desire to limit the powers of the president in terms that often appeared openly critical of Yuan's ambitions. When the results of the 1913 elections indicated a clear victory for the KMT, it appeared that Song would be in a position to exercise a dominant role in selecting the premier and cabinet, and the party could have proceeded to push for the election of a future president in a parliamentary setting. On 20 March 1913, Song Jiaoren was shot by a lone gunman in Shanghai, and died two days later. The trail of evidence led to the secretary of the cabinet and the provisional premier of Yuan's government. Although Yuan was considered by contemporary Chinese media sources as the man most likely behind the assassination, the main conspirators investigated by authorities either were themselves assassinated or disappeared mysteriously. For lack of evidence, Yuan was not implicated.

== Becoming emperor ==
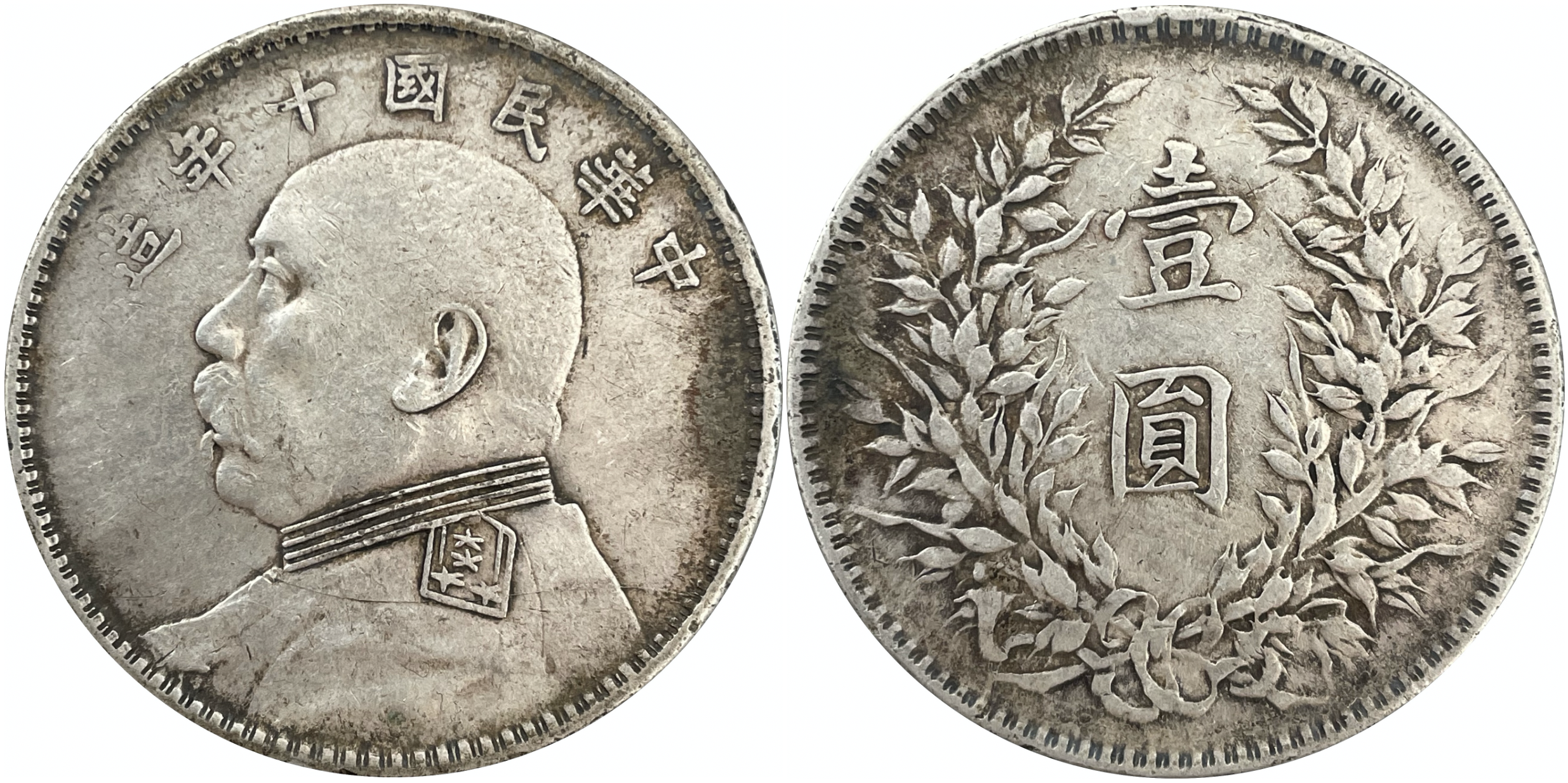
The Yuan dollar (yuan in Chinese), issued for the first time in 1914, became a dominant coin type of the Republic of China.

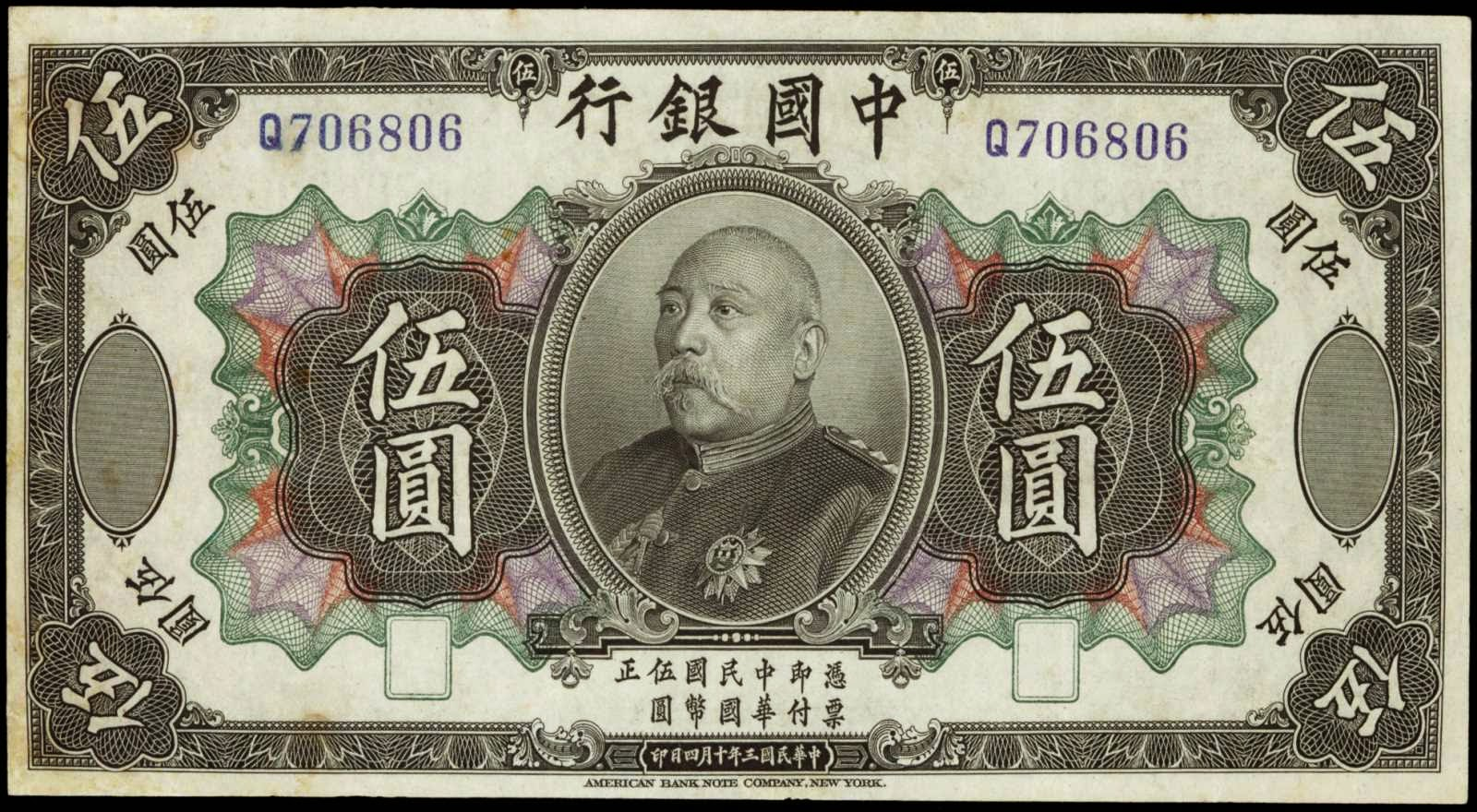
A banknote from the early Republic of China depicting the face of President Yuan.

Tensions between the KMT and Yuan continued to intensify. After arriving in Beijing, the newly elected National Assembly sought to assert its authority over Yuan, draft a permanent constitution, and conduct a legitimate presidential election by open vote. In March 1913, Song Jiaoren, expected to become premier and a leading advocate of cabinet governance, was assassinated in Shanghai, in a plot widely attributed to Yuan. In April, Yuan secured a $25 million "reorganization loan" from a consortium of foreign banks without the National Assembly's approval, drawing strong backlash from the Kuomintang in particular.

=== Second Revolution ===
Seeing the situation for his party worsen, Sun Yat-sen fled to Japan in August 1913, and called for a Second Revolution, this time against Yuan. Subsequently, Yuan gradually took over the government, using the military as the base of his power. He dissolved the national and provincial assemblies, and the House of Representatives and Senate were replaced by the newly formed "Council of State", with Duan Qirui, his trusted Beiyang lieutenant, as prime minister. He relied on the American-educated Tsai Tingkan for English translation and connections with western powers. Finally, Yuan had himself elected president to a five-year term, publicly labelled the KMT a seditious organization, ordered the KMT's dissolution, and evicted all its members from Parliament. The KMT's "Second Revolution" ended in failure as Yuan's troops achieved complete victory over revolutionary uprisings. Provincial governors with KMT loyalties who remained willingly submitted to Yuan. Because those commanders not loyal to Yuan were effectively removed from power, the Second Revolution cemented Yuan's power.

In January 1914, China's Parliament was formally dissolved. To give his government a semblance of legitimacy, Yuan convened a body of 66 men from his cabinet who, on 1 May 1914, produced a "constitutional compact" that effectively replaced China's provisional constitution. The new legal status quo gave Yuan, as president, practically unlimited powers over China's military, finances, foreign policy, and the rights of China's citizens. Yuan justified these reforms by stating that representative democracy had been proven inefficient by political infighting.

After his victory, Yuan reorganized the provincial governments. Each province was supported by a military governor (都督) as well as a civil authority, giving each governor control of his own army. This helped lay the foundations for the warlordism that crippled China over the next two decades.

During Yuan's presidency, silver coinage featuring his portrait was introduced. This coin type was the first "dollar" coin of the central authorities of the Republic of China to be minted in large quantities. It became a staple silver coin type during the first half of the 20th century and was struck for the last time as late as the 1950s. The coins were also extensively forged.

=== Japan's 21 demands ===
In 1914, Japan captured the German colony at Qingdao. In January 1915, Japan sent a secret ultimatum, known as the Twenty-One Demands, to Beijing. Japan demanded an extension of extraterritoriality, the sale of businesses in debt to Japan and the cession of Qingdao to Japan, and virtual control of finance and the local police. When these demands were made public, hostility within China was expressed in nationwide anti-Japanese demonstrations and an effective national boycott of Japanese goods. With support from Britain and the United States Yuan secured Japan's dropping part five of the demands, which would have given Japan a general control of Chinese affairs. However he did accept the less onerous terms and that led to a decline in the popularity of Yuan's government.

=== Revival of hereditary monarchy ===
Emperor of China
- 中華帝國皇帝
- Imperial
- Imperial Emblem

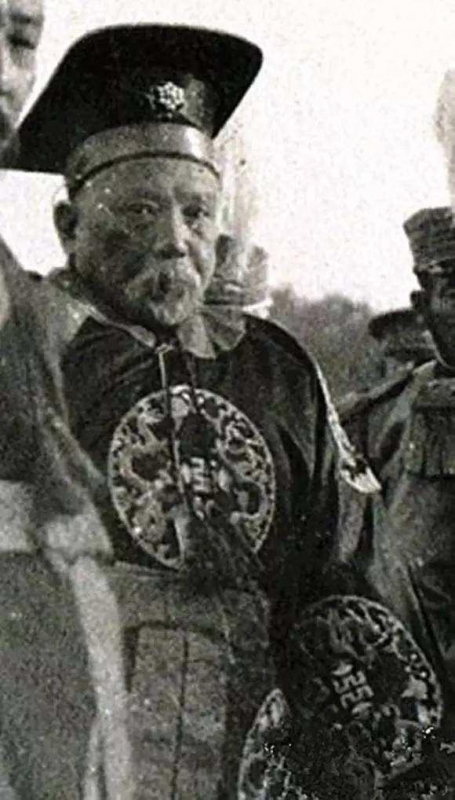
- The President dressed in the traditional chaofu attire, before his subsequent coronation. 1915.

Details
- Style: His Imperial Majesty
- First monarch: Hongxian
- Formed: 12 December 1915
- Abolished: 22 March 1916
- Residences: Forbidden City, Beijing

To build up his own authority, Yuan began to re-institute elements of state Confucianism. As the main proponent of reviving Qing state religious observances, Yuan effectively participated as emperor in rituals held at the Qing Temple of Heaven. In late 1915, rumours were floated of a popular consensus that the hereditary monarchy should be revived. With his power secure, many of Yuan's supporters, notably monarchist Yang Du, advocated for a revival of the hereditary monarchy, asking Yuan to take on the title of Emperor. Yang reasoned that the Chinese masses had long been used to monarchic rule, the Republic had been effective only as a transitional phase to end Manchu rule, and China's political situation demanded the stability that only a dynastic monarchy could ensure. The American political scientist Frank Johnson Goodnow suggested a similar idea. Negotiators representing Japan had also offered to support Yuan's ambitions as one of the rewards for Yuan's support of the Twenty-One Demands.

On 20 November 1915, Yuan held a specially convened "Representative Assembly" which voted unanimously to offer Yuan the throne. On 12 December 1915, Yuan "accepted" the invitation and proclaimed himself Emperor of the Chinese Empire (traditional Chinese: 中華帝國大皇帝; simplified Chinese: 中华帝国大皇帝; pinyin: Zhōnghuá Dìguó Dà Huángdì) under the era name of Hongxian (洪憲; 洪宪; Hóngxiàn; lit. Constitutional Abundance). The new Empire of China was to formally begin on 1 January 1916, when Yuan intended to conduct the accession rites. Soon after becoming emperor, the Yuan placed an order with the former imperial potters for a 40,000-piece porcelain set costing 1.4 million yuan, a large jade seal, and two imperial robes costing 400,000 yuan each.

Yuan expected widespread domestic and international support for his reign. British diplomats and bankers had previously worked hard to help him succeed. They had set up a banking consortium that loaned Yuan's government £25 million in April 1913. However, he and his supporters had badly miscalculated. Many of the emperor's closest supporters abandoned him, and the solidarity of the emperor's Beiyang clique of military protégés dissolved. There were open protests throughout China denouncing Yuan. Foreign governments, including Japan, suddenly proved indifferent or openly hostile to him, not giving him the recognition anticipated.

A popular account derives from a memoir by Yuan's third daughter, Jingxue (born Shuzhen), which holds that Keding, in order to position himself as crown prince, fabricated editions of the Shuntian Times, a Chinese-language newspaper owned by Japanese, filling them with pro-monarchy editorials to encourage Yuan's imperial ambitions, thereby leading Yuan to misjudge popular opinion. Yuan's great-grandson Shi (born Jiyan) and other family descendants have cast doubt on the account, noting that it rests solely on Jingxue's memoir, written in her capacity and likely under pressure in the 1960s as a researcher at the China Central Institute for Culture and History, largely a united front organ of the Chinese Communist Party.

=== Abandonment of monarchy and death ===
Funeral procession of Yuan Shikai in Beijing
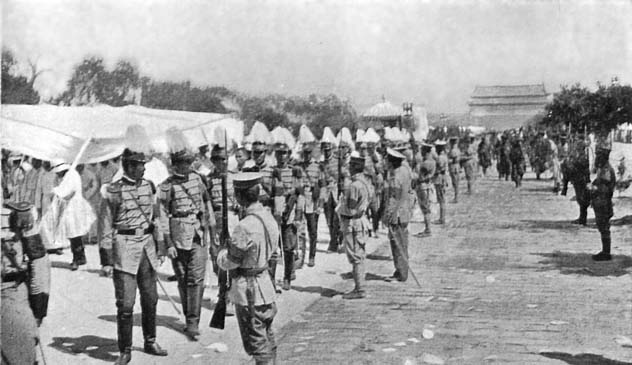
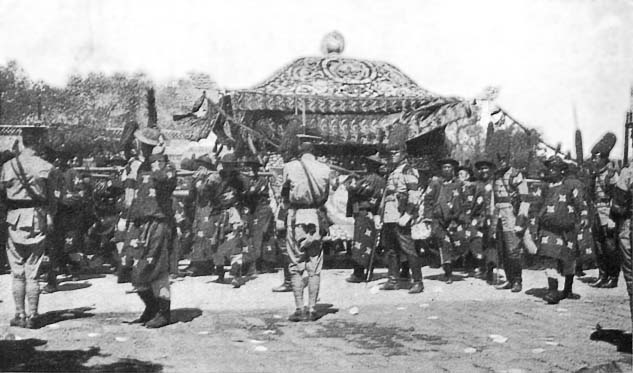
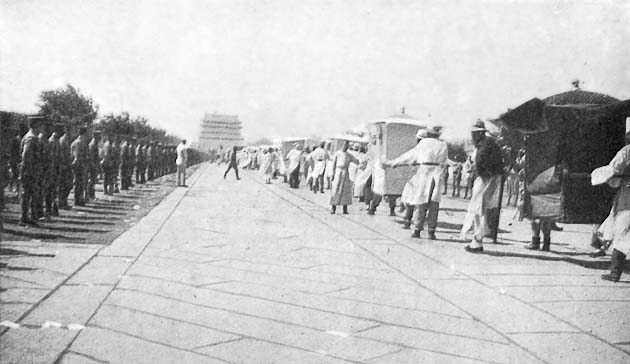

In 1916, rebels against Yuan bombed the presidential palace from the air. Sun Yat-sen, who had fled to Tokyo and set up a base there, organized efforts to overthrow Yuan again. The formerly loyal subordinates such as Duan Qirui and Xu Shichang left him to create their own factions. Even Yuan's second son, Kewen, opposed his revival of monarchy and subsequently left for Shanghai.

Faced with widespread opposition, Yuan repeatedly postponed the enthronement in order to appease his foes, but his prestige was irreparably damaged and province after province continued to voice disapproval. On 25 December 1915, Yunnan's military governor, Cai E, rebelled, launching the National Protection War. The governor of Guizhou followed in January 1916, and Guangxi declared independence in March. Funding for Yuan's accession ceremony was cut on 1 March.

Yuan never held a formal enthronement. He announced his abdication and restored the Republic on 22 March 1916 after being emperor for only 83 days; primarily due to these mounting revolts as well as declining health from kidney failure. This was not enough for his enemies, who called for his resignation as president, causing more provinces to rebel. Yuan died of kidney failure at 10 a.m. on 6 June 1916, at the age of fifty-six.

Yuan's remains were moved to his home province and placed in a large mausoleum in Anyang. In 1928, the tomb was looted by Feng Yuxiang and his soldiers during the Northern Expedition.

== Evaluation and legacy ==
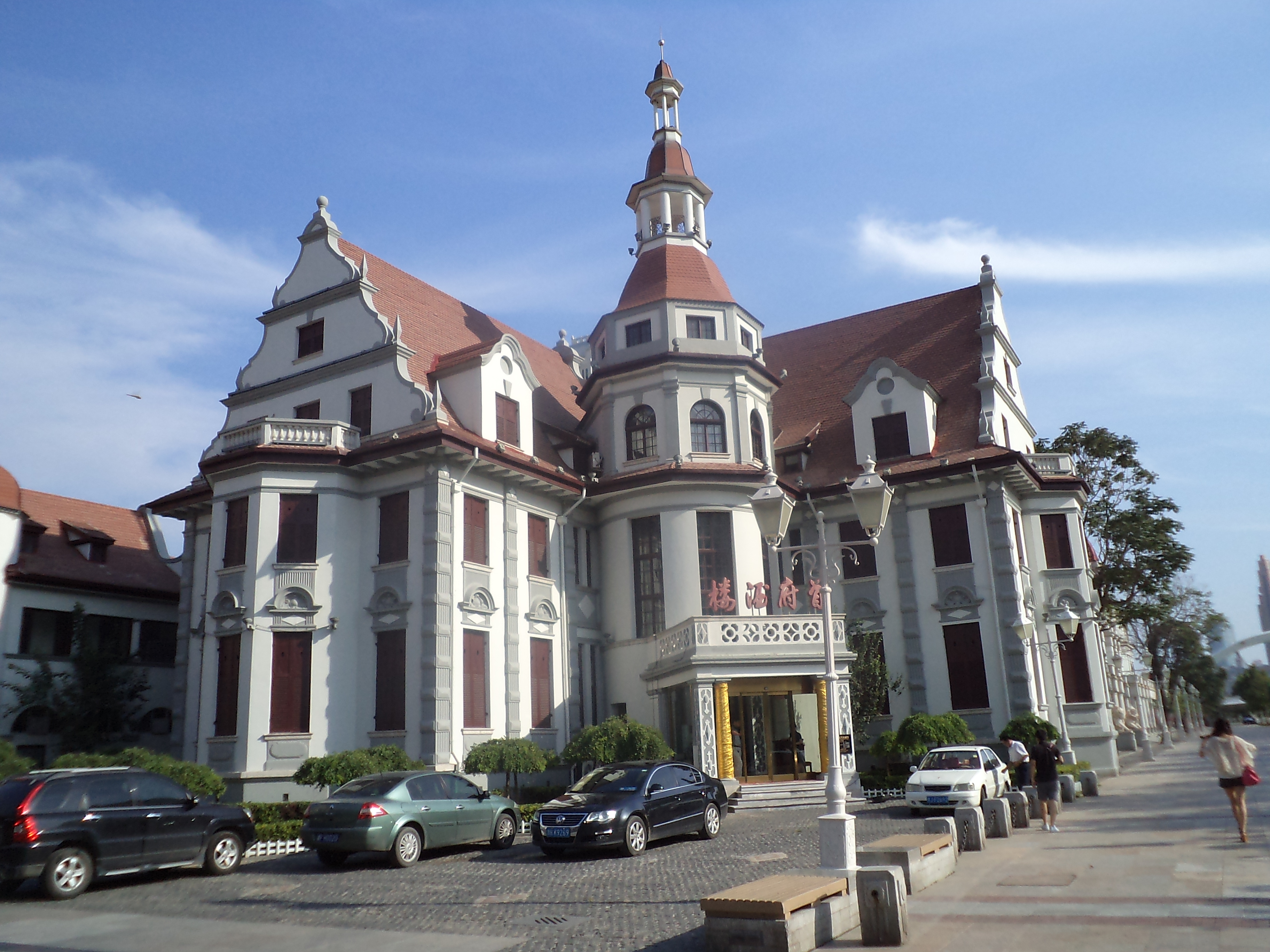
The residence of Yuan in Tianjin

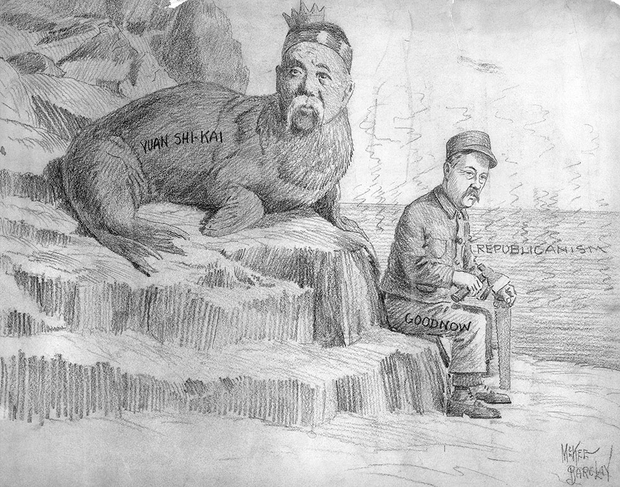
Satirical political cartoon of Yuan from 1915.

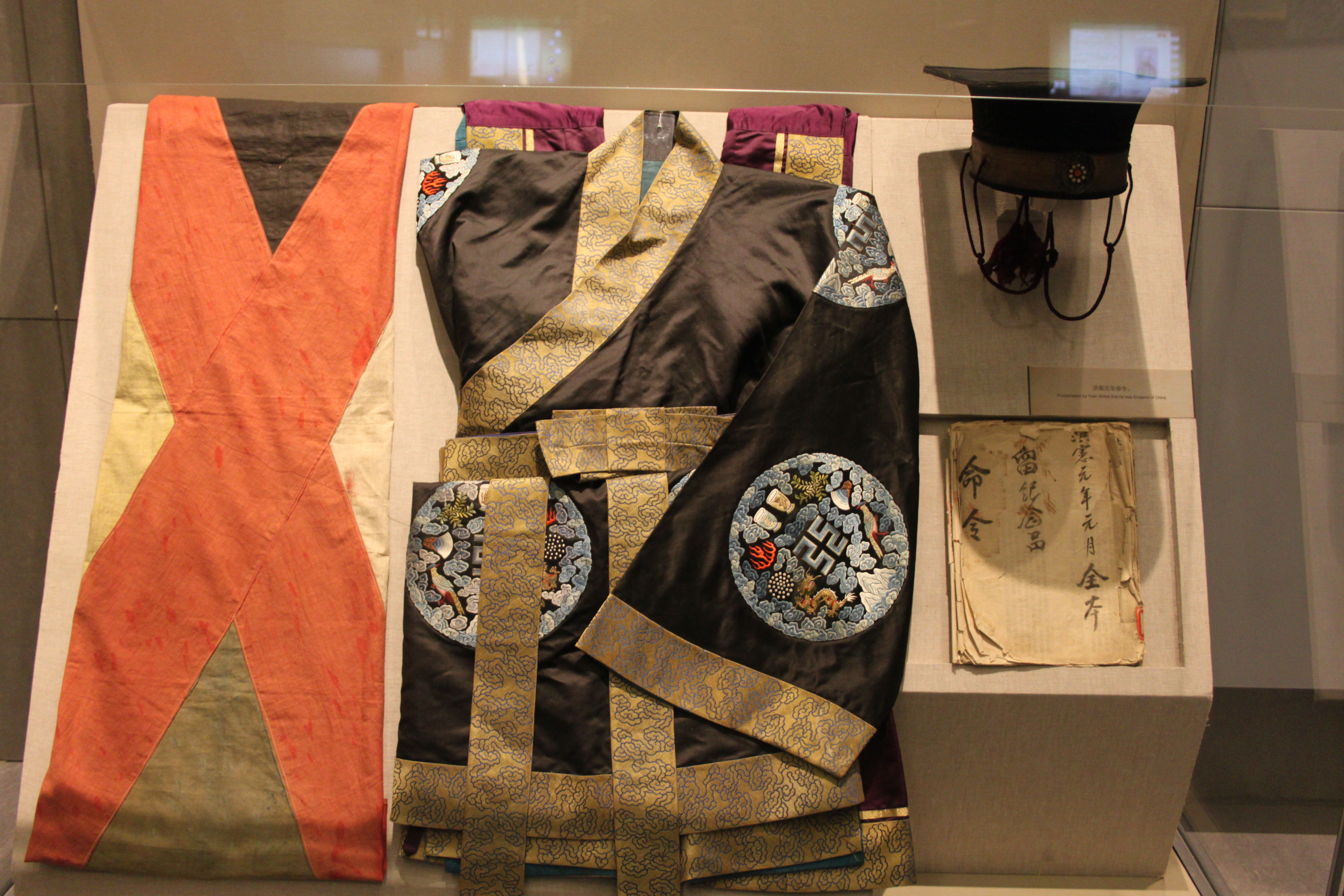
Imperial mianfu of Yuan.

Yuan has been portrayed negatively in the official historiography of both the Nationalist and Communist parties, making him one of the few figures on whom both sides agree in their condemnation. The traditional view holds that Yuan betrayed the Hundred Days' Reform by informing Ronglu of the reformers' coup plot, prompting Empress Dowager Cixi's crackdown; usurped the 1911 Revolution through his negotiations with the revolutionaries, wresting the presidency from Sun Yat-sen; orchestrated the assassination of his rival for power, Song Jiaoren, blighting hopes for democracy in early twentieth-century China; and concluded a series of unequal treaties with foreign powers. Some scholars, however, have questioned whether Yuan was responsible for either the failure of the Hundred Days' Reform or Song’s assassination, or have instead acknowledged his contributions to China’s unification and modernization.

Jonathan Spence notes that Yuan was "ambitious, both for his country and for himself", and that "even as he subverted the constitution, paradoxically he sought to build on late-Qing attempts at reforms and to develop institutions that would bring strong and stable government to China." To gain foreign confidence and end the hated system of extraterritoriality, Yuan strengthened the court system and invited foreign advisers to reform the penal system.

After Yuan's death, there was an effort by Li Yuanhong to revive the Republic by recalling the legislators who had been ejected in 1913, but this effort was confused and ineffective in asserting central control. Li lacked any support from the military. There was a short-lived effort in 1917 to revive the Qing dynasty led by the loyalist general Zhang Xun, but his forces were defeated by rival warlords later that year.

After the collapse of Zhang's movement, all pretence of strength from the central government collapsed, and China descended into a period of warlordism. Over the next several decades, the offices of both the president and parliament became the tools of militarists, and the politicians in Peking became dependent on regional governors for their support and political survival. For this reason, Yuan is sometimes called "the Father of the Warlords". However, it is not accurate to attribute China's subsequent age of warlordism as a personal preference, since in his career as a military reformer he had attempted to forge a modern army based on the Japanese model. Throughout his lifetime, he demonstrated an understanding of staffing, military education, and regular transfers of officer personnel, combining these skills to create China's first modern military organisation. After his return to power in 1911, however, he seemed willing to sacrifice his legacy of military reform for imperial ambitions, and instead ruled by a combination of violence and bribery that destroyed the idealism of the early Republican movement.

In the CCTV production Towards the Republic, Yuan is portrayed through most of his early years as an able administrator, although a very skilled manipulator of political situations. His self-proclamation as Emperor is largely depicted as being influenced by external forces, especially that of his son, Yuan Keding.

A bixi stone tortoise with a stelae in honour of Yuan, which was installed in Anyang's Huanyuan Park soon after his death, was partly restored in 1993.

== Names ==
Chinese men before 1949 customarily used and were referred to by various names. Yuan's courtesy name was "Weiting" (Wade-Giles spelling: Wei-ting; Chinese: 慰亭; pinyin: Wèitíng; Wade–Giles: Wei^{⁴}-t'ing^{²}), and he used the pseudonym "Rong'an" (Wade-Giles spelling: Jung-an; Chinese: 容庵; pinyin: Róng'ān; Wade–Giles: Jung^{²}-an^{¹}). He was sometimes referred to by the name of his birthplace, "Xiangcheng" (simplified Chinese: 项城; traditional Chinese: 項城; pinyin: Xiàngchéng; Wade–Giles: Hsiang^{⁴}-ch'eng^{²}), or by a title for tutors of the crown prince, "Kung-pao" (simplified Chinese: 宫保; traditional Chinese: 宮保; pinyin: Gōngbǎo; Wade–Giles: Kung^{¹}-pao^{³}).

== Awards and honours ==
- Order of the Paulownia Flowers (Japan)
- Order of the Red Eagle (Germany)

== Family ==
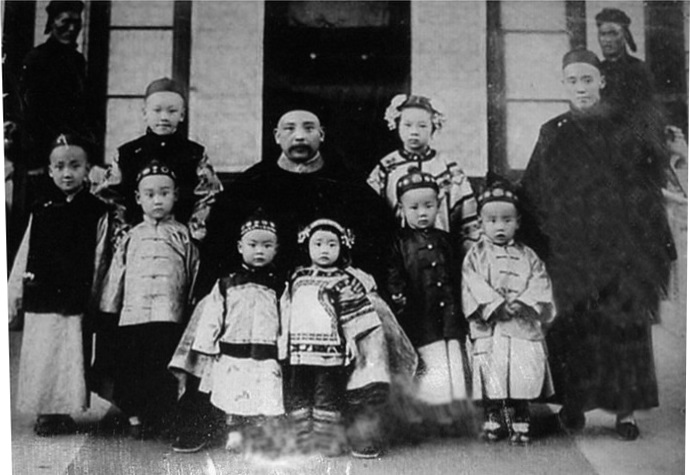
Yuan and some of his children

Paternal grandfather

- Yuan Shusan (袁澍三)

Father

- Yuan Baozhong (袁保中) (1823–1874), courtesy name Shouchen (受臣)

Uncle

- Yuan Baoqing (袁保慶) (1825–1873), courtesy name Duchen (篤臣), pseudonym Yanzhi (延之), Yuan Baozhong's younger brother

Wife

- Yu Yishang (于義上), daughter of Yu Ao (於鰲), a wealthy man from Shenqiu County, Henan; married Yuan in 1876; mother of Yuan Keding.

9 concubines

- Lady Shen (沈氏), previously a courtesan from Suzhou
- Lady Lee (李氏), of Korean origin; mother of Yuan Bozhen, Yuan Kequan, Yuan Keqi, Yuan Kejian, and Yuan Kedu
- Lady Kim (金氏), of Korean origin; mother of Yuan Kewen, Yuan Keliang, Yuan Shuzhen, Yuan Huanzhen, and Yuan Sizhen
- Lady O (吳氏), of Korean origin; mother of Yuan Keduan, Yuan Zhongzhen, Yuan Cizhen, and Yuan Fuzhen
- Lady Yang (楊氏), mother of Yuan Kehuan, Yuan Kezhen, Yuan Kejiu, Yuan Ke'an, Yuan Jizhen, and Yuan Lingzhen
- Lady Ye (葉氏), previously a prostitute in Nanjing; mother of Yuan Kejie, Yuan Keyou, Yuan Fuzhen, Yuan Qizhen, and Yuan Ruizhen
- Lady Zhang (張氏), originally from Henan
- Lady Guo (郭氏), originally a prostitute from Suzhou; mother of Yuan Kexiang, Yuan Kehe, and Yuan Huzhen
- Lady Liu (劉氏), originally a maid to Yuan's fifth concubine Lady Yang; mother of Yuan Kefan and Yuan Yizhen

17 sons

1. Yuan Keding (袁克定) (1878–1958), courtesy name Yuntai (雲台)
2. Yuan Kewen (袁克文) (1889–1931), courtesy name Baocen (豹岑)
  1. Luke Chia-Liu Yuan (袁家骝) (1912–2003), third son of Kewen
  2. Chien-Shiung Wu (吳健雄) (1912–1997), wife of Luke
3. Yuan Keliang (袁克良), married a daughter of Zhang Baixi
4. Yuan Keduan (袁克端), married He Shenji (何慎基, daughter of He Zhongjing (何仲璟))
5. Yuan Kequan (袁克權) (1898–1941), courtesy name Gui'an (規庵), pseudonym Baina (百衲), married a daughter of Toteke Duanfang (托忒克·端方)
6. Yuan Kehuan (袁克桓), married Chen Zheng (陳徵, daughter of Chen Qitai (陳啟泰))
7. Yuan Keqi (袁克齊), married a daughter of Sun Baoqi
8. Yuan Kezhen (袁克軫), married Zhou Ruizhu (周瑞珠, daughter of Zhou Fu (周馥))
9. Yuan Kejiu (袁克玖), married Li Shaofang (黎紹芳, 1906–1945, second daughter of Li Yuanhong) in 1934
10. Yuan Kejian (袁克堅), married a daughter of Lu Jianzhang (陸建章)
11. Yuan Ke'an (袁克安), married Li Baohui (李寶慧) (daughter of Li Shiming (李士銘))
12. Yuan Kedu (袁克度), married a daughter of the wealthy Luo Yunzhang (羅雲章)
13. Yuan Kexiang (袁克相), married firstly Zhang Shoufang (張壽芳, granddaughter of Na Tong (那桐)), married secondly Chen Sixing (陳思行, daughter of Chen Bingkun)
14. Yuan Kejie (袁克捷), married Lady Wang (王氏)
15. Yuan Kehe (袁克和), married a daughter of Zhang Diaochen (張調宸)
16. Yuan Kefan (袁克藩), died young
17. Yuan Keyou (袁克友), married a daughter of Yu Yunpeng (于雲鵬)

15 daughters

Famous grandsons and great-grandsons

- Yuan's grandson, Luke Chia-Liu Yuan (1912–2003) was a Chinese-American physicist and husband of famed physicist Chien-Shiung Wu.
- Yuan's great-grandson, Li-Young Lee (1957–), is an Indonesian-born Chinese-American writer and poet.

== See also ==
- Beiyang Army
- History of the Republic of China
- Republic of China Armed Forces
- Sino-German cooperation (1926–1941)
- Beiyang government

Yuan Shikai (House of Yuan) Born: 16 September 1859 Died: 6 June 1916
Political offices
Preceded by Yuxian	Governor of Shandong; 1900–1901	Succeeded by Zhang Renjun
Preceded by Li Hongzhang	Viceroy of Zhili; Minister of Běiyáng; 1901–1907	Succeeded by Yang Shixiang
Preceded by Lu Haihuan	Secretary of Foreign Affairs; 1907–1908	Succeeded by Liang Dunyan
Preceded by Yikuang	Prime Minister of the Imperial Cabinet; 2 November 1911 – 10 March 1912	Succeeded by Tang Shaoyi (Premier)
Preceded by Sun Yat-sen (Sun Yat-sen)	President of China; 10 March 1912 – 12 December 1915	Monarchy restored Monarchy restored
Vacant Title last held by Himself	President of China; 22 March 1916 – 6 June 1916	Succeeded by Li Yuanhong
Regnal titles
Vacant Title last held by Xuantong	Emperor of China; 1 January – 22 March 1916; Empire declared on 12 December 1915	Vacant Title next held by Xuantong
