= Shuntian Times =

Chinese-language newspaper under Japanese ownership

Shuntian Times 順天時報
- Type: Daily newspaper
- Founder: Nakajima Masao
- Founded: December 1901
- Ceased publication: March 26, 1930
- Political alignment: Pro-Japan; Anti-Soviet; Anti-Communism
- Language: Chinese
- Headquarters: Beiping
- OCLC number: 18193516

Shuntian Times (Chinese: 順天時報), also known as Shuntian Daily, or Shuntian Shibao, was a Chinese-language newspaper under Japanese ownership, published in the Shuntian Prefecture (Beiping) area of China, founded in December 1901 by Japanese entrepreneur Nakajima Masao. It is the first daily newspaper published by foreigners in Beiping.

Shuntian Times was a daily newspaper established by Nakajima Masao in Beiping in December 1901, when the Empress Dowager Cixi fled to Xi'an after the Boxer Rebellion. The newspaper was originally titled Yanjing Times (燕京時報), but was named "Shuntian Times" when Kuga Katsunan came to Beiping. In 1905, Shuntian Times became Japan's official propaganda organ. It was anti-Soviet and anti-Communism, calling the Soviet Union a red-blooded aggressor.

The newspaper had reporters in major cities in China, collecting intelligence on the Chinese political situation everywhere, and vigorously supporting China's pro-Japanese warlords, so it was ridiculed by people as Nitian Times (逆天時報).

On March 26, 1930, Shuntian Times published to No. 9284, and it was suspended due to the resistance of the Chinese people.
