= Zhao Ti =

Chinese general

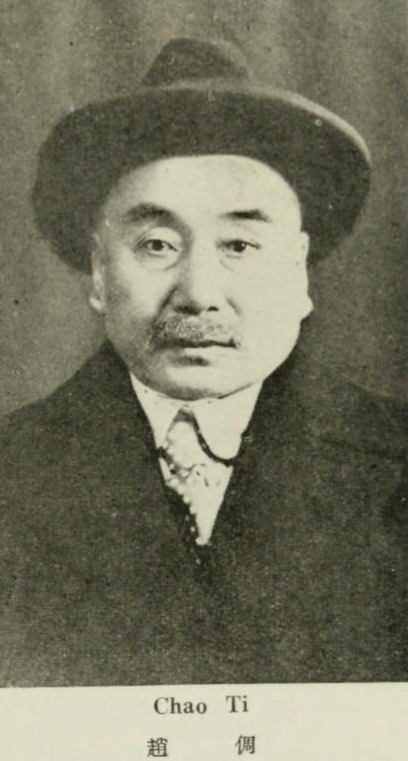
- 赵倜(《中国名人录》第四版增订, 1933年)
- Born: 1871; Henan
- Died: 1933

Zhao Ti (Chinese: 赵倜) (1871–1933) was a Chinese general of the late Qing and early Republican period of China. In 1920, he was military governor of Henan.
