= Chinese noble titles in the imperial period =

Examples of noble titles granted during imperial China (221 BCE – CE 1911)

During imperial China (221 BCE–1911 CE), a wide variety of noble titles were granted. Some of these were hereditary; an overlapping subset were honorary.

At the beginning of imperial China, the administration of territory was growing out of the older fengjian system, and the central government asserting more control over the old aristocracy. The emperor, as sovereign, held the power to grant noble titles and to enfeoff vassals.

== Enfeoffing members of overthrown dynasties ==
It was a custom in China for the new dynasty to ennoble and enfeoff a member of the dynasty which they overthrew with a title of nobility and a fief of land so that they could offer sacrifices to their ancestors, in addition to members of other preceding dynasties. This practice was referred to as "the two crownings and three respects."

When the Xia dynasty was overthrown by the Shang dynasty, Xia descendants were given a title and fiefs by the Shang King in Qi and Zeng. (The kings of Yue claimed to be a cadet branch of the Xia).

When the Shang dynasty was overthrown by the Zhou dynasty, the Zhou King granted a Shang descendant the title of Duke and fief in the Song, and the Zhou King also reconfirmed the titles of the Xia descendants in the Qi and Zeng. Confucius was a descendant of the Shang Kings via the Song Dukes and Confucius' descendants held the hereditary title Duke Yansheng right to 1935.

When the Yue King Wujiang (無彊) was conquered by Chu, the Chu King enfeoffed Wujiang as Marquis of Ouyang District.

When the Han dynasty Emperor Xian of Han was dethroned by the Cao Wei Emperor Cao Pi, Cao granted Emperor Xian the title Duke of Shanyang (山陽公). His grandson Liu Kang (劉康) inherited his dukedom, which lasted for 75 more years and two more dukes, Liu Jin (劉瑾) and Liu Qiu (劉秋), until the line was exterminated by invading Xiongnu tribes in about 309, during the Jin dynasty.

The Emperors of Shu Han came from a cadet branch of the Han dynasty. When the Shu Han Emperor Liu Shan was defeated by Cao Wei, the Cao Wei enfeoffed Liu Shan as the "Duke of Anle" (安樂公; literally meaning "duke of peace and comfort") while his sons and grandsons became marquises. Liu Shan died in 271 in Luoyang, and was given the posthumous name "Duke Si of Anle" (安樂思公; literally "the deep-thinking duke of Anle"). His dukedom lasted several generations during Wei's successor state, the Jin dynasty, before being extinguished in the turmoils caused by the Wu Hu.

When the Eastern Wu was defeated by the Jin dynasty, the Jin Emperor granted the Eastern Wu Emperor Sun Hao the title of "Marquis of Guiming". Sun Hao's sons were made junior officials in the Jin government.

When the Jin dynasty Emperor Gong of Jin was overthrown by the Liu Song Emperor Wu of Liu Song, Emperor Wu enfeoffed Emperor Gong as Prince of Lingling. However Emperor Gong was ordered killed. Sima Guang was a Jin Imperial family descendant who became a chancellor in the Song dynasty hundreds of years after the fall of the Jin.

When the Liu Song Emperor Shun of Liu Song was overthrown by the Southern Qi Emperor Gao of Southern Qi, Emperor Gao enfeoffed Emperor Shun as Prince of Ruyin. However Emperor Shun was killed.

When the Southern Qi Emperor He of Southern Qi was overthrown by the Liang dynasty Emperor Wu of Liang, Emperor Wu enfeoffed Emperor He as Prince of Baling. However Emperor He was killed.

When the Liang dynasty Emperor Jing of Liang was overthrown by the Chen dynasty Emperor Wu of Chen, Emperor Wu enfeoffed Emperor Jing as Prince of Jiangyin. However Emperor Jing was killed.

The Xianbei Tuoba royal family of Northern Wei started to arrange for Han Chinese elites to marry daughters of the royal family in the 480s. Some Han Chinese exiled royalty fled from southern China and defected to the Xianbei. Several daughters of the Xianbei Emperor Xiaowen of Northern Wei were married to Han Chinese elites, the Han Chinese Liu Song royal Liu Hui 刘辉, married Princess Lanling 蘭陵公主 of the Northern Wei, Princess Huayang 華陽公主 to Sima Fei 司馬朏, a descendant of Jin dynasty (266–420) royalty, Princess Jinan 濟南公主 to Lu Daoqian 盧道虔, Princess Nanyang 南阳长公主 to Xiao Baoyin 萧宝夤, a member of Southern Qi royalty. Emperor Xiaozhuang of Northern Wei's sister the Shouyang Princess was wedded to The Liang dynasty ruler Emperor Wu of Liang's son Xiao Zong 蕭綜.

When the Eastern Jin dynasty ended Northern Wei received the Jin prince Sima Chuzhi 司馬楚之 as a refugee. A Northern Wei Princess married Sima Chuzhi, giving birth to Sima Jinlong. Northern Liang King Juqu Mujian's daughter married Sima Jinlong.

When the Northern Qi Emperor Gao Heng was overthrown by Northern Zhou Emperor Wu of Northern Zhou, Emperor Wu enfeoffed Emperor Gao Heng as Duke of Wen. However Gao Heng was killed.

When the Northern Zhou Emperor Jing of Northern Zhou was overthrown by the Sui dynasty Emperor Wen of Sui, Emperor Wen enfeoffed Emperor Jing as Duke of Jie. However, he had all of close male clansmen of the duke—all grandsons of Emperor Jing's great-grandfather Yuwen Tai—put to death, as well as Emperor Jing's brothers Yuwen Kan (宇文衎) the Duke of Lai and Yuwen Shu (宇文術) the Duke of Yan. About three months later, Emperor Wen had the Duke of Jie secretly assassinated as well, but pretended to be shocked and declared a mourning period, and then buried him with honors due an emperor. The dukedom was passed to a distant relative, Yuwen Luo (宇文洛).

When the Western Liang (Southern and Northern Dynasties) (西梁) Emperor Jing of Western Liang was overthrown by the Sui dynasty Emperor Wen of Sui, Emperor Wen enfeoffed Emperor Jing as Duke of Ju (莒公) and then as Duke of Liang (梁公). His nephew Xiao Ju (蕭鉅) inherited the title of Duke of Liang.

When the Chen dynasty Emperor Chen Shubao was overthrown by the Sui dynasty Emperor Wen of Sui, Emperor Wen enfeoffed Chen Shubao as Duke Yang of Changcheng (長城煬公).

The Tang dynasty Emperors claimed descent from the Dukes of Western Liang (Sixteen Kingdoms) (西涼) and posthumously gave them Imperial titles.

When the Tang dynasty Emperor Ai of Tang was overthrown by the Later Liang Emperor Zhu Wen, Zhu Wen enfeoffed Emperor Ai as Prince of Jiyin. However Emperor Ai was killed.

There were Dukedoms for the offspring of the royal families of the Zhou dynasty, Sui dynasty, and Tang dynasty in the Later Jin (Five Dynasties).

When the Wuyue King Qian Chu surrendered to the Song dynasty the Song Emperor Taizong of Song raised the prefecture of Yangzhou to the nominal state of Huaihai, and installed Qian Chu as King of Huaihai. In 984, Qian Chu was made King of Hannan (a smaller nominal feoff) instead, and in 987 reduced again to King of Hanyang, with the right to take up residence in Hanyang, but then immediately additionally created Prince of Xu, with an enlarged fief. In 988, Qian Chu lost his title as king and was made Prince of Deng instead, with a larger nominal fief and actual income.

When the Jin dynasty (1115–1234) defeated the Liao dynasty and Northern Song dynasty Emperor Tianzuo of Liao and Emperor Qinzong of Song were first enfeoffed with derogatory titles by the Jin, with Emperor Tianzuo becoming the Prince of Haibin 海滨王 ("Seashore Prince") and Emperor Qinzong becoming the Marquess of Chonghun (重昏, "Doubly muddled"); his father received a similarly derogatary-sounding title. In 1141, as the Jin relations with the Southern Song were about to normalized, Qinzong's captors granted him a neutrally-sounding title of the Duke (公, gong) of Tianshui Jun, after a commandery in the upper reaches of the Wei River (now in Gansu), while his father (who had died in 1135) was posthumously styled the Prince of Tianshui Jun; a few months later he started receiving a stipend due to his rank. Liao royal family members who stayed in the Jin state like Yelu Lu and his son Yelü Chucai served the Jin and then the Yuan dynasty as officials. Other members of the Khitan Liao royal family like Yelü Dashi and Song Imperial family like Emperor Gaozong of Song both survived to rule the Kara-Khitan Khanate and Southern Song dynasty respectively.

When the Kingdom of Dali was conquered by the Yuan dynasty, King Duan Xingzhi of Dali was then enfeoffed as Maharaja by the Yuan Emperor Kublai Khan. The Southern Song dynasty Emperor Gong of Song was enfeoffed as the Duke of Ying (瀛國公) by Kublai Khan, however, the Emperor Yingzong of Yuan ordered him to commit suicide. The Song Prince Zhao Yurui was enfeoffed with the title Duke of Pingyuan Canton (平原郡公) by Emperor Kublai Khan. Other Song Imperial family members like Zhao Mengfu and Zhao Yong were left alive by the Yuan. Zhao Yiguang was a Song Imperial family descendant who was a writer during the Ming dynasty.

When the Ming dynasty fell and the Qing dynasty took over, the Qing Emperors granted a Ming descendant the title Marquis of Extended Grace and gave him a stipend to perform sacrifices to his ancestors, the Ming Emperors at the Ming Imperial Tombs. The Qing granted Zheng Keshuang of the Kingdom of Tungning the title of "Duke of Haicheng" (海澄公) after he surrendered to the Qing.

When the Northern Yuan Chahar Borjigin Mongol Khan Ejei Khan surrendered to the Qing, he was given the title of Prince of the first rank (Qin Wang, 親王), a title he held until his death in 1661, and inherited by his younger brother Abunai (阿布奈). Abunai openly showed his discontent toward the Manchu and he was put under house arrest in Shenyang by the Kangxi Emperor in 1669 and his imperial title / rank was given to his son Borni (布尔尼) in September of that same year. Borni (布尔尼) was careful to not show any sign of disrespecting the Qing dynasty, but finally in 1675, he suddenly rebelled along with his younger brother Lubuzung (罗布藏), capitalizing on the Revolt of the Three Feudatories. However, they had made a serious miscalculation in wrongfully believing that other Mongols would join them, when in reality only three thousand Chahar (Mongols) joined the rebellion. It only took a single decisive battle on April 20, 1675, to defeat Abunai (阿布奈) and his followers, who were all killed subsequently in their retreat. The Qing dynasty's punishment of the rebellion was very harsh: all royal males of Chahar (Mongols) were executed, including infants born to Qing / Manchu princesses, and all royal females of Chahar (Mongols) were sold to slavery except these Qing / Manchu princesses.

The Republic of China allowed the last Qing Emperor to stay in the Forbidden City and keep his title, treating him as a foreign monarch until 1924. The descendants of Confucius were maintained in the title of Duke Yansheng until 1935 when the title was changed to Sacrificial Official to Confucius (大成至聖先師奉祀官), which remains as a position to this day, currently held by Kung Tsui-chang.

== Historical examples ==
=== Qin and Han dynasty ===
Prior to the Qin dynasty, Wang (sovereign) was the title for the ruler of whole China. Under him were the vassals or Zhuhou (諸侯), who held territories granted by a succession of Zhou dynasty kings. They had the duty to support the Zhou king during an emergency and were ranked according to the Five Orders of Nobility. In the Spring and Autumn period, the Zhou kings had lost most of their powers, and the most powerful vassals became the de facto ruler of China. Finally, in the Warring States period, most vassals declared themselves Wang or kings, and regarded themselves as equal to the Zhou king.

After Zheng, king of the state of Qin, later known as Qin Shi Huang, defeated all the other vassals and unified China, he adopted the new title of Huangdi (emperor). Qin Shi Huang eliminated noble titles, as he sponsored legalism which believed in merit, not birth. He forced all nobles to the capital, seized their lands and turned them into administrative districts with the officials ruling them selected on merit. After the demise of Qin Er Shi, the last Qin ruler to use the title Huangdi (his successor Ziying used the title King of Qin rather than Emperor), Xiang Yu styled himself Hegemon King of Western Chu (Xichu Bàwáng 西楚霸王) rather than Emperor. Xiang Yu gave King Huai II of Chu the title of Emperor of Chu (楚義帝) or The Righteous Emperor of Southern Chu (南楚義帝) and awarded the rest of his allies, including Liu Bang, titles and a place to administer. Xiang Yu gave Liu Bang the Principality of Han, and he would soon replace him as the ruler of China.

The founder of the Han dynasty, Liu Bang, continued to use the title Huangdi. In order to appease his wartime allies, he gave each of them a piece of land as their own "kingdom" (Wangguo) along with a title of Wang. He eventually killed all of them and replaced them with members of his family. These kingdoms remained effectively independent until the Rebellion of the Seven States. Since then, Wang became merely the highest hereditary title, which roughly corresponded to the title of prince, and, as such, was commonly given to relatives of the emperor. The title Gong also reverted purely to a peerage title, ranking below Wang. Those who bore such titles were entirely under the auspices of the emperor, and had no ruling power of their own. The two characters combined to form the rank, Wanggong, grew to become synonymous with all higher court officials.

The title of Duke of Song and "Duke Who Continues and Honours the Yin" (殷紹嘉公) were bestowed upon Kong An 孔安 (東漢) by the Eastern Han dynasty because he was part of the Shang dynasty's legacy. This branch of the Confucius family is a separate branch from the line that held the title of Marquis of Fengsheng village and later Duke Yansheng.

The Han dynasty bestowed the hereditary title 周子南君 upon the Zhou dynasty royal descendant Ji Jia 姬嘉 and his descendants.

Family tree of Chinese nobility from the Han dynasty to the Five Dynasties and Ten Kingdoms period. (中國士族世系圖列表)

=== Between Han and Sui ===
Nine-rank system Dishu system

Special "commanderies of immigrants" and "white registers" were created for the massive amount of northern-origin Han Chinese who moved south during the Eastern Jin dynasty. The southern Chinese aristocracy was formed from the offspring of these migrants. Celestial Masters and the nobility of northern China subdued the nobility of southern China during the Western Jin (the Jiangnan region specifically) and Eastern Jin periods. Southern China became the most populous region of China after the depopulation of the north and the migration of northern Chinese to southern China. Different waves of migration of aristocratic Chinese from northern China to the south at different times resulted in distinct groups of lineages, with some lineages arriving in the 300s-400s and others in the 800s-900s.

Literati of all ethnicities seemed to be regarded as Han Chinese, because even ethnic Xianbei affiliated with the Northern Wei were referred to (insultingly) as "damned Chinese" by the Northern Qi elites from the Northern Garrisons.

Examples of individuals appearing as culturally Xianbei and at the same time declaring Han Chinese ancestry was Gao Huan and the Han family. The Han Chinese Gao family of Bohai (渤海高氏) was claimed by Gao Huan as his ancestors. Gao was of Han Chinese background but Xianbei-acculturated. He was raised in Huaishuozhen while his family came from Bohai prefecture in modern Hebei. He was culturally Xianbei since his clan was raised in Inner Mongolia after being relocated from what is modern Hebei (Bohai) where his Han Chinese ancestors lived. Honorary Bohai descent was bestowed upon Gao Longshi by Gao Huan. Bohai was asserted as the ancestral home of Gao Huan by Gao Huan.

Huaibei was the geographic origin of the Zhou of Runan 汝南周氏 who were part of the Eastern Jin dynasty. The Linghu of Dunhuang 敦煌令狐氏 were descended from King Wen of Zhou through his son Duke Gao of Bi 畢公高. The Yan of Langye 琅邪顏氏 spawned Yan Zhitui. The Northern Wei's Eight Noble Xianbei surnames 八大贵族 were the Buliugu 步六孤, Helai 賀賴, Dugu 獨孤, Helou 賀樓, Huniu 忽忸, Qiumu 丘穆, Gexi 紇奚, and Yuchi 尉遲. They adopted Chinese last names.

A fief of 100 households and the rank of 崇聖侯 Marquis who worships the sage was bestowed upon a Confucius descendant, Yan Hui's lineage had 2 of its scions and Confucius's lineage had 4 of its scions who had ranks bestowed on them in Shandong in 495 and a fief of ten households and rank of 崇聖大夫 Grandee who venerates the sage was bestowed on 孔乘 Kong Sheng who was Confucius's scion in the 28th generation in 472 by Emperor Xiaowen of Northern Wei.

Despite the massacre Cui Hao's clan, the Cui clan of Qinghe survived into the Tang dynasty.

=== Sui dynasty and Tang dynasty ===
The aristocracy of the Tang era can be divided into 4 blocs, the most prestigious Northeastern (Shandong, which included Hebei, Henan, central Shanxi) bloc, the Northwestern (Guan-Long, or Shaanxi, southern and northern Shanxi) bloc, the Southern émigré clans, and the Southern native aristocrats. The Southern émigrés primarily emphasised Buddhism and belles lettres literature, while the other 3 blocs were more focused on Confucian Classics. Due to rebellions that plagued the south in late Northern and Southern dynasties, the Southerners were weaker than the Northerners, a situation exacerbated by the capital being in the north.

The northeastern Chinese aristocracy during the Sui-Tang period was of pure Han blood, while they looked down upon the northwestern aristocracy which was of mixed Han and Xianbei blood. This hybrid mixed blood Chinese and Northwestern (Guanlong) 關隴集團 aristocracy was the source of the Sui dynasty and Tang dynasty Imperial clans who were responsible for reuniting China.

The northwest military aristocracy was the group from which the Sui dynasty Emperors originated; they emphasized that their patrilineal ancestry was ethnic Han, claiming descent from the Han official Yang Zhen. The New Book of Tang traced his patrilineal ancestry to the Zhou dynasty kings via the Dukes of Jin. The Sui Emperors had maternal Xianbei ancestry from a woman of the Xianbei Dugu family. The Tang dynasty Imperial family claimed to be paternally descended from Laozi (whose personal name was Li Dan or Li Er), the Han dynasty General Li Guang, Qin General Li Xin and Western Liang ruler Li Gao. This family was known as the Longxi Li lineage (隴西李氏). The Tang Emperors had Xianbei maternal ancestry, from Emperor Gaozu of Tang's Xianbei mother Duchess Dugu.

Ancient Han ancestry was asserted by the Tang and Sui Emperors, while the admixture was the result of their Xianbei mothers, the Dugu clan.

The Guanzhong noble families of Han Chinese background married the Northern Zhou Xianbei Yuwen family.

The Northeastern aristocracy supported Wu Zetian while the Northwestern aristocracy opposed her. The northwestern aristocracy was countered by the northeastern aristocracy who were supported by the Sui Yangdi Emperor. However, political positions within both the northeastern and northwestern aristocracies was not uniform.

During the Tang dynasty, nobles lost most of their power to the radical changes imposed by Emperor Gaozong and Wu Zetian of Tang. The Anding origin noble Liang family produced Liang Su, a Confucian scholar. An anti-meritocratic pro-aristocratic faction was led by Li Linfu.

The Han Chinese noble families of Northeastern region dominated the Central Plains-based Northern Qi and Eastern Wei.

A "marriage ban" was applied to the northeastern aristocracy by emperor Tang Taizong in an attempt to stop them from intermarrying further and reinforcing their prestige. However this policy backfired. During the Tang dynasty the Li family of Zhaojun 赵郡李氏, the Cui clan of Boling, the Cui clan of Qinghe, the Lu clan of Fanyang, the Zheng family of Xingyang w:zh:荥阳郑氏, the Wang family of Taiyuan 太原王氏, and the Li family of Longxi 隴西李氏 were the seven noble families 七姓十家 between whom marriage was banned by law. Moriya Mitsuo wrote a history of the Later Han-Tang period of the Taiyuan Wang. Among the strongest families was the Taiyuan Wang. The prohibition on marriage between the clans issued in 659 by the Gaozong Emperor was flouted by the seven families since a woman of the Boling Cui married a member of the Taiyuan Wang, giving birth to the poet Wang Wei. He was the son of Wang Chulian who in turn was the son of Wang Zhou. The marriages between the families were performed clandestinely after the prohibition was implemented on the seven families by Gaozong. The Zhou dynasty King Ling's son Prince Jin is assumed by most to be the ancestor of the Taiyuan Wang. The Longmen Wang were a cadet line of the Zhou dynasty descended Taiyuan Wang, and Wang Yan and his grandson Wang Tong hailed from his cadet line. Both Buddhist monks and scholars hailed from the Wang family of Taiyuan such as the monk Tanqian. The Wang family of Taiyuan included Wang Huan. Their status as "Seven Great surnames" became known during Gaozong's rule. The Taiyuan Wang family produced Wang Jun who served under Emperor Huai of Jin. A Fuzhou-based section of the Taiyuan Wang produced the Buddhist monk Baizhang.

Other clans included the Zhao of Tianshui 天水趙氏, the Gao of Bohai 渤海高氏, the Liu of Pengcheng 彭城劉氏, the Zhang of Qinghe 清河張氏, the Zhang of Nanyang 南陽張氏, the Pei of Hedong 河東裴氏, the Wei of Jingzhao 京兆韋氏, the Yang of Hongong 弘農楊氏, and the Wang of Langye 琅邪王氏.

The Zheng family of Xingyang 滎陽鄭氏 claim descent from the Zhou dynasty Kings via the rulers of the State of Zheng. The Marquis of Xingyang rank was created for Zheng Xi. The Xingyang Zheng spawned Zheng Daozhao and Zheng Xi. Zheng Wanjun was a member of the Xingyang Zheng. The Xingyang Zheng spawned Zheng Yuzhong (Zheng Qiao). The Xingyang Zheng spawned Zheng Jiong. The Zheng of Xingyang may have been miswritten in the records as the Zheng of Rongyang.

The bigger Longxi Li lineage outside of the Tang Imperial family has prominent members like Li Jiongxiu, Li Yiyan, Li Kui (chancellor), Li Wei (Tang dynasty), Li Fengji, Li Zhongyan, Li Jing (Tang dynasty), Li Zhaode, and Li Bai.

Cui Qun was part of the Cui clan of Qinghe.

The Tang Longxi lineage also included sub lineages like the Guzang Li (姑臧李), from which Li Zhuanmei 李專美 came from.

The Zhaojun Li were written about by David Johnson while the Cui of Boling were written about by Patricia Ebrey.

The cadet Canhuang Li were part of the Li of Zhaojun. The Li of Longxi produced Li Kuan 李觀 while the Li of Zhaojun produced Li Hua 李華.

The Tianshui Zhao 天水趙氏. The Song dynasty Emperors hailed from the Guandong Zhao while the Longxi Li produced the Tang Emperors.

The seven clans were divided into a further 44 sub branches.

The Li of Zhaojun and the Lu of Fanyang hailed from Shandong and were related to the Liu clan which was also linked to the Yang of Hongnong and other clans of Guanlong.

The Li of Zhaojun, Lu of Fanyang, Zheng of Yingyang 滎陽鄭氏 were of Shandong origin like the Wang of Taiyuan.

The Yang of Hongnong 弘農楊氏 were asserted as ancestors by the Sui Emperors like the Longxi Li's were asserted as ancestors of the Tang Emperors. The Dukes of Jin were claimed as the ancestors of the Hongnong Yang. The Yang of Hongnong spawned 楊昭儉 Yang Zhaojian. This clan was the family of Yang Guozhong, Yang Guifei, and Yang Wan Their ancestor was Yang Zhen who served during the reign of Emperor An of Han. He is mentioned in the Book of the Later Han.

The Pei of Hedong 河東裴氏 produced Pei Qi.

The Yang of Hongnong, Jia of Hedong, Xiang of Henei, and Wang of Taiyuan from the Tang dynasty were claimed as ancestors by Song dynasty lineages.

The Zhou of Runan 汝南周氏 lived on after the Tang dynasty's collapse.

Meng Haoran and Meng Jiao were descendants of Mencius who lived during the Tang dynasty.

=== After Tang dynasty ===
Some Song dynasty families were descended from Tang era nobility.

Some of the Tang dynasty Imperial family's cadet branches ended up in Fujian- one founded by Li Dan 李丹 which became prominent in the Song dynasty. another founded by Li Fu 李富 also becoming prominent during the Song dynasty.

The Tang Longxi lineage also included sub lineages like the Guzang Li 姑臧李, from which Li Zhuanmei 李專美 came from, who served the Later Jin.

Descendants of the Tang Emperors live in Chengcun village near the Wuyi mountains in Fujian.

Subsequent dynasties expanded the hereditary titles further. Not all titles of peerage are hereditary, and the right to continue the heredity passage of a very high title was seen as a very high honour; at the end of the Qing dynasty, there were five grades of princes, amongst a myriad of other titles. For details, see Qing dynasty nobility.

A few Chinese families enjoyed hereditary titles in the full sense, the chief among them being the Holy Duke of Yen (the descendant of Confucius); others, such as the lineal descendants of Wen Tianxiang, ennobled the Duke of Xingguo, not choosing to use their hereditary title.

When the Ming dynasty emerged Emperor Zhu Yuanzhang's military officers who served under him were given noble titles which privileged the holder with a stipend but in all other aspects was merely symbolic. (功臣世表) Mu Ying's family was among them. Special rules against abuse of power were implemented on the nobles.

Zengzi was a descendant of the Xia dynasty Kings through Shao Kang.

Duke Huan of Lu's son through Qingfu (慶父) was the ancestor of Mencius. He was descended from Duke Yang of the State of Lu 魯煬公 Duke Yang was the son of Bo Qin, who was the son of the Duke of Zhou of the Zhou dynasty royal family. The genealogy is found in the Mencius family tree (孟子世家大宗世系).

During the Ming dynasty, one of Mencius' descendants was given a hereditary title at the Hanlin Academy by the Emperor. The title they held was Wujing Boshi (五经博士; 五經博士; Wǔjīng Bóshì).

In 1452 Wujing Boshi was bestowed upon the offspring of Mengzi-Meng Xiwen 孟希文 56th generation and Yan Hui-Yan Xihui 顔希惠 59th generation, the same was bestowed on the offspring of Zhou Dunyi-Zhou Mian 週冕 12th generation, the two Cheng brothers (Cheng Hao and Cheng Yi-Chen Keren 程克仁 17th generation), Zhu Xi-Zhu Ting 朱梴 (Zhu Chan?) 9th generation, in 1456–1457, in 1539 the same was awarded to Zeng Can's offspring-Zeng Zhicui 曾質粹 60th generation, in 1622 the offspring of Zhang Zai received the title and in 1630 the offspring of Shao Yong. Zhang Zai's offspring received the appointment as wujing boshi along with Zhu Xi's, Cheng Hao's, Cheng Yi's, and Zhou Dunyi's offspring. Biographies of those who were awarded the title of Wujing Boshi in the Ming dynasty are found in Volume 284, Biographies 172 of the History of Ming (明史).

The Imperial Clansmen consisted of those who trace their descent direct from the founder of the Qing dynasty, and were distinguished by the privilege of wearing a yellow girdle; collateral relatives of the imperial house wore a red girdle. Twelve degrees of nobility (in a descending scale as one generation succeeds another) were conferred on the descendants of every emperor; in the thirteenth generation the descendants of emperors were merged in the general population, save that they retain the yellow girdle. The heads of eight houses, the Iron-capped (or helmeted) princes, maintained their titles in perpetuity by rule of primogeniture in virtue of having helped the Manchu conquest of China.

The title Wujing boshi 五經博士 was created in the Han dynasty. Holders of the title were considered part of Hanlin Academy.

Confucian sages (Disciples of Confucius and Neo Confucian scholars) offspring were granted the office of "Wujing Boshi" (五经博士; 五經博士; Wǔjīng Bóshì). There were 22 of them. (Note: "Present Day Political Organization of China" by V.V. Hagelstrom and H.S. Brunnert contains a list of people who were awarded the title: The title of 五經博士 Wu3 Ching1 Po2 Shih4, or simply 博士 Po2 Shih4 (literary designation, 大瀚博 Ta4 Han4 Po2), is also transmitted to the eldest, in a direct line, of the descendants of the following famous men of antiquity : 1. 周公 Chou1 Kung1, 2. 顏淵 Yen2 Yüan1, 3. 曾子輿 Tsêng1 Tzu3-yü2, 4. 閔子騫 Min3 Tzu3-ch'ien1, 5. 仲季路 Chung4 Chi4-lu4, 6. 有子有 Yu3 Tzu3-yu3, 7. 端木子貢 Tuan1 Mu4 Tzu3 Kung4, 8. 卜子夏 Pu3 Tzu3-hsia4, 9. 言子游 Yen2 Tzu3-yu2, 10. 冉伯牛 Jan3 Po2-niu2, 11. 冉仲弓 Jan3 Chung4-kung1, 12. 顓孫子張 Chuan1 Sun1 Tzu3 Chang1, 13. 孟子 Mêng4 Tzu3, 14. 伏生 Fu2 Shêng1, 15. 韓愈 Han4 Yü4, 16. 周敦頤 Chou1 Tun1-i2, 17. 邵雍 Shao4 Yung1, 18. 程顥 Ch'êng2 Hao4, 19. 程頤 Ch'êng2 I2, 20. 張載 Chang 1 Tsai3, 21. 朱熹 Chu1 Hsi3, and 22. 關羽 Kuan1 Yü3.) It was also granted to the cadet branch of the Confucius family at Quzhou.

The descendants of the Four Sages 四氏, Confucius, Mencius, Zengzi, and Yan Hui still use generation poems for their names given to them by the Ming and Qing Emperors.

The Qing appointed the Ming imperial descendants to the title of Marquis of Extended Grace.

Zhang Daoling's offspring, the Celestial Masters held the title of 正一嗣教眞人.

The main line of the Duke of Zhou's descendants came from his firstborn son, the State of Lu ruler Bo Qin's third son Yu (魚) whose descendants adopted the surname Dongye (東野).

東野家族大宗世系 Family Tree of the descendants of the Duke of Zhou in Chinese

One of the Duke of Zhou's 72 generation descendants family tree was examined and commented on by Song Lian.

The Zhikou Jiangs (also romanized as "Chiangs") such as Chiang Kai-shek were descended from Jiang Shijie who during the 17th century moved there from Fenghua District, whose ancestors in turn came to southeastern China's Zhejiang province after moving out of Northern China in the 13th century CE. The 12th-century BCE Duke of Zhou's third son was the ancestor of the Jiangs.

The oldest held continuous noble title in Chinese history was that held by the descendants of Confucius, as Duke Yansheng, which was renamed as the Sacrificial Official to Confucius in 1935 by the Republic of China. The title is held by Kung Tsui-chang.

Han defectors played a massive role in the Qing conquest of China. Han Chinese Generals who defected to the Manchu were often given women from the Imperial Aisin Gioro family in marriage while the ordinary soldiers who defected were often given non-royal Manchu women as wives. The Manchu leader Nurhaci married one of his granddaughters to the Ming General Li Yongfang 李永芳 after he surrendered Fushun in Liaoning to the Manchu in 1618. The offspring of Li received the "Third Class Viscount" (三等子爵; sān děng zǐjué) title. Li Yongfang was the great-great-great-grandfather of Li Shiyao 李侍堯.

Upon the surrender of Zheng Keshuang he received the title of Duke Haicheng from the Qing and his follower Feng Xifan received the title of Count Zhongcheng.

Shi Lang received the title of Marquis Jinghai from the Qing.

Zeng Guofan, Zuo Zongtang and Li Hongzhang received the title of Marquis from the Qing. Zeng Guofan was a descendant of Zengzi through a cadet branch.

Most titles of nobility were officially abolished when China became a republic in 1912, with the Republic maintaining some titles like Duke Yansheng. They were briefly expanded under Yuan Shikai's empire and after Zhang Xun's coup. The last emperor was allowed to keep his title but was treated as a foreign monarch until the 1924 coup. Manchukuo also had titles of nobility.

The bestowal of titles was abolished upon the establishment of the People's Republic of China in 1949.

The families of the descendants of the Four Sages 四氏 still hold hereditary offices in the Republic of China (Taiwan) such as the Sacrificial Official to Confucius, "Sacrificial Official to Mencius", "Sacrificial Official to Zengzi", and "Sacrificial Official to Yan Hui".

=== List of people granted peerage by Yuan Shikai as self-proclaimed emperor (1915–1916) ===
After the fall of the Qing dynasty and its "Last Emperor" Puyi in the Xinhai Revolution of 1911, Chinese President Yuan Shikai attempted to resurrect the imperial system, proclaiming himself emperor in his brief Empire of China (1915–1916) which ended with his death 83 days after its inauguration. During this period, Yuan Shikai as sovereign declared the ennoblement of several people, in this case not so much his family and clan as allies and those he sought as supporters for the new Empire. Some declined the honors.

==== Prince of the First Rank Wuyi (武義親王 Wǔyì qīn wáng) ====
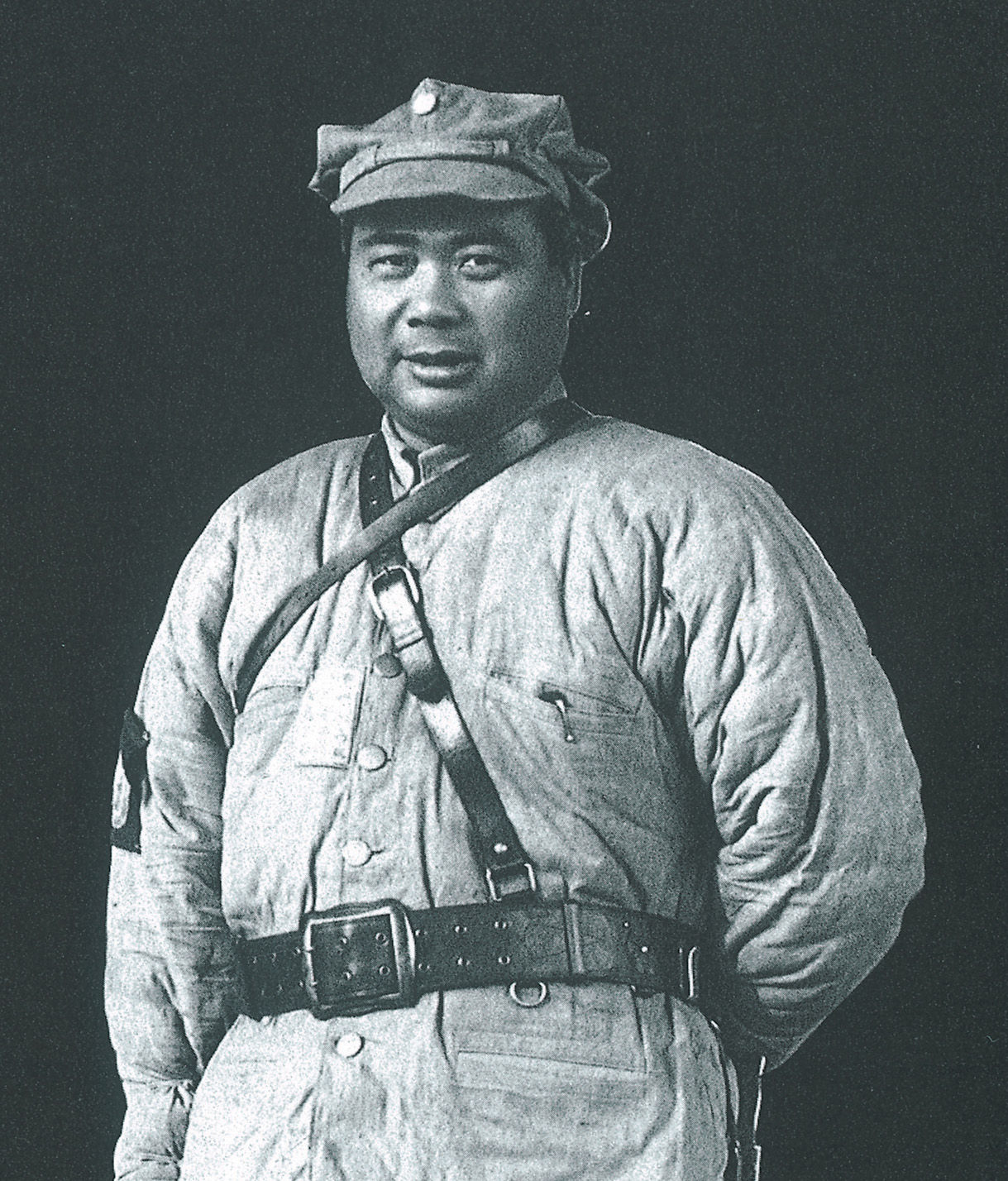
Feng Yuxiang, made Baron of the Third Rank by Yuan Shikai who proclaimed himself Emperor in 1915, just five years after Yuan Shikai had imprisoned him as a rebel and stripped his military rank; sent to fight for Yuan Shikai with his new noble title and a new military rank, Feng Yuxiang communicated with the enemy and was stripped of military rank a second time.

- Li Yuanhong
- Duke Yansheng Kong Lingyi

==== Dukes of the First Rank (一等公 Yī děng gōng) ====
- Long Jiguang (龍濟光)
- Zhang Xun
- Feng Guozhang
- Jiang Guiti (姜桂題)
- Duan Zhigui
- Ni Sichong
- Liu Guanxiong

==== Marquesses of the First Rank (一等侯 Yī děng hóu) ====
- Tang Xiangming (湯薌銘)
- Li Chun (李純)
- Zhu Rui (朱瑞)
- Lu Rongting
- Zhao Ti (趙倜)
- Chen Yi
- Tang Jiyao
- Yan Xishan
- Wang Zhanyuan (王占元)
- Lui Kang

==== Counts of the First Rank (一等伯 Yī děng bó) ====
- Zhang Xiluan (張錫鑾)
- Zhu Jiabao (朱家寶)
- Zhang Mingqi (張鳴岐)
- Tian Wenlie (田文烈)
- Jin Yunpeng
- Yang Zengxin (楊增新)
- Lu Jianzhang (陸建章)
- Meng Enyuan (孟恩遠)
- Qu Yinguang (屈映光)
- Qi Yaolin (齊耀琳)
- Cao Kun
- Yang Shande (楊善德)

==== Viscounts of the First Rank (一等子 Yī děng zǐ) ====
- Zhu Qinglan (朱慶瀾)
- Zhang Guangjian (張廣建)
- Li Houji (李厚基)
- Liu Xianshi (劉顯世)

==== Barons of the First Rank (一等男 Yī děng nán) ====
- Ma Anliang (馬安良)
- Xu Shiying (許世英)
- Qi Yang (戚揚)
- Ren Kecheng (任可澄)
- Wang Yitang (王揖唐)
- He Zonglian (何宗蓮)
- Zhang Huaizhi (張懷芝)
- Long Jinuang (龍覲光)
- Chen Bingkun
- Lu Yongxiang (盧永祥)
- Lü Diaoyuan (呂調元)
- Jin Yong (金永)
- Cai Rukai (蔡儒楷)
- Duan Shuyun (段書雲)
- Long Jianzhang (龍建章)
- Shen Jinjian (沈金鑑)
- Pan Juying (潘矩楹)

==== Baron of the Third Rank (三等男 Sān děng nán) ====
- Feng Yuxiang

=== Modern Chinese styles for foreign monarchs ===
In modern Chinese, a king is referred to as a Wang, while an emperor would be referred to as Huangdi. Traditional Chinese political theory held that "All lands under Heaven belong to the emperor, all people under Heaven belong, are subjects of the emperor." (普天之下，莫非王土; 率土之濱, 莫非王臣; pǔtiān zhī xià, mòfēi wáng tǔ). Queen Victoria was styled Nü-Wang (Queen) of the United Kingdom of Britain and Ireland. Thus, a foreign monarch would also be referred to as Wang, implying that one was inferior in rank and thus subject to the Chinese emperor.
