= Kopec =

Kopec, Kopeć, or Köpec may refer to:

== Places ==
- Kopeć, a village in Ostrzeszów county, Poland
- Köpec, a village in Baraolt, Romania
- Köpeç, Uğurludağ
- Kopec, a village in the Ústí nad Labem Region, Czechia

== People ==
- Ben Kopec (born 1981), American musician
- Danny Kopec (1954–2016), American chess master, author, and computer scientist
- Dominik Kopeć, Polish athlete
- Matt Kopec, American politician
- Stefan Kopec (1888–1941), Polish biologist
- Tadeusz Kopeć (born 1960), Polish politician

== See also ==
- KEPCO E&C, a South Korean company formerly known as "KOPEC"
- Kopek (disambiguation)
