= Ruble (disambiguation) =

Ruble or rouble is the name of currency units used in Russia and some other eastern European states.

Ruble or rouble may also refer to:

== Currencies in circulation ==
- Russian ruble
  - Digital ruble
- Belarusian ruble
- Transnistrian ruble

== Former currencies ==
This list may not contain all historical rubles, especially rubles issued by sub-national entities.

=== Soviet ruble ===
- Sovznak
- Ruble of the Far-Eastern Republic
- Transcaucasian ruble
- Chervonets
- Soviet ruble; in various Soviet republics the ruble carried local names as well

=== Pre- and post-Soviet currencies ===
- Armenian ruble (1919–23)
- Azerbaijani ruble (ruble is the Russian name of the first Azerbaijani manat) (1918–1923)
- Georgian ruble (ruble is the Russian name of the Georgian maneti)
- Latvian ruble (1919–22, 1992–93)
- Ruble of Svalbard
- Tajikistani ruble (1995–2000)
- Transcaucasian ruble
- Ukrainian coupon (Ukrainian karbovanets)
- Tuvan akşa and kɵpejek

=== Imperial Russia ===
- Silver ruble (1704–1897), Assignation ruble (1769–1849), Constantine ruble (collectible)
- Gold ruble (1897–1917), Brut ruble (credit banknote)
- Copper ruble and Sestroretsk ruble

=== World War I and the Russian Civil War ===
- German ostrubel (1916–1918)
- Kerenka (1917–1919)
- Odessa ruble
- Don ruble
- Siberia ruble
- Harbin ruble

=== Other ===
- Lithuanian ruble or grivna (until 1579)

== People with the name Ruble ==
- Ruble Blakey (1911–1912), American jazz singer, emcee, actor
- Joseph Ruble Griffin (1923–1988), Justice of the Mississippi Supreme Court, United States

== People with the name Rouble ==
- Rouble Nagi (b. 1980), Indian artist
- Patrick Rouble, Canadian politician

== See also ==
- Kopek (disambiguation)
