= Chinese nobility =

Traditional social structure of Ancient China and Imperial China

The nobility of China represented the upper strata of aristocracy in premodern China, acting as the ruling class until the late seventh to ninth centuries during the Tang dynasty, and remaining a significant feature of the traditional social structure until the end of the imperial period.

The concepts of hereditary sovereignty, peerage titles, and noble families existed as early as the semi-mythical and early historical periods, but the systems of enfeoffment and establishment only developed in the Zhou dynasty, by the end of which a clear delineation of ranks had emerged. This process was a function of the interface between the ancient patriarchal clan system, an increasingly sophisticated apparatus of state, and an evolving geopolitical situation. While the imperial peerage system described here refers to noble titles formally conferred and inherited under state authority, the so-called “aristocracy” discussed in relation to the medieval period (roughly the 3rd to 9th centuries) was not defined by such titles. Instead, it denoted a broader social stratum of powerful lineages whose elite status derived primarily from pedigree and bureaucratic officeholding rather than from imperially sanctioned noble ranks. (Note: On the distinction between titled nobility and pedigree-based aristocratic lineages, and the historical trajectory of the latter, see Wen, Wang & Hout (2024) and Wang & Yang (2025).)

By the Tang dynasty (618–907 CE), these semi-hereditary aristocratic families, distinct from formal noble titles, were already in decline. Their political advantages steadily eroded as bureaucratic recruitment expanded beyond pedigree lines. Quantitative analyses of Tang elites indicate that this erosion began as early as the late seventh century, marking a sustained weakening of hereditary privilege long before the final century of the dynasty. Social mobility rose markedly during this period, while the influence of family pedigree on official attainment declined. (Note: For an influential earlier interpretation, see Tackett, N. (2014). The Destruction of the Medieval Chinese Aristocracy. Harvard University Press, which attributes the sudden collapse of aristocratic lineages to the upheavals of the Huang Chao Rebellion (874–884 CE). More recent quantitative analyses, including Wen, Wang, and Hout (2024), Wang & Yang (2025), and Wang (2025), provide systematic evidence that the decline of aristocratic privilege was a more gradual process that began well before the late Tang period.) The Imperial examination system, which had existed in earlier forms, gained increasing institutional importance under the Tang and played an expanding role in official recruitment and social mobility. This transformation effectively ended the power of the old aristocratic clans, replacing them with a more bureaucratic and merit-based elite.

The last, well-developed system of noble titles was established under the final imperial dynasty, the Qing. The Republican Revolution of 1911 ended the official imperial system. Though some noble families maintained their titles and prestige for a time, new political and economic circumstances forced their decline. Today, this class has virtually disappeared.

== Sovereign and ruling family ranks ==
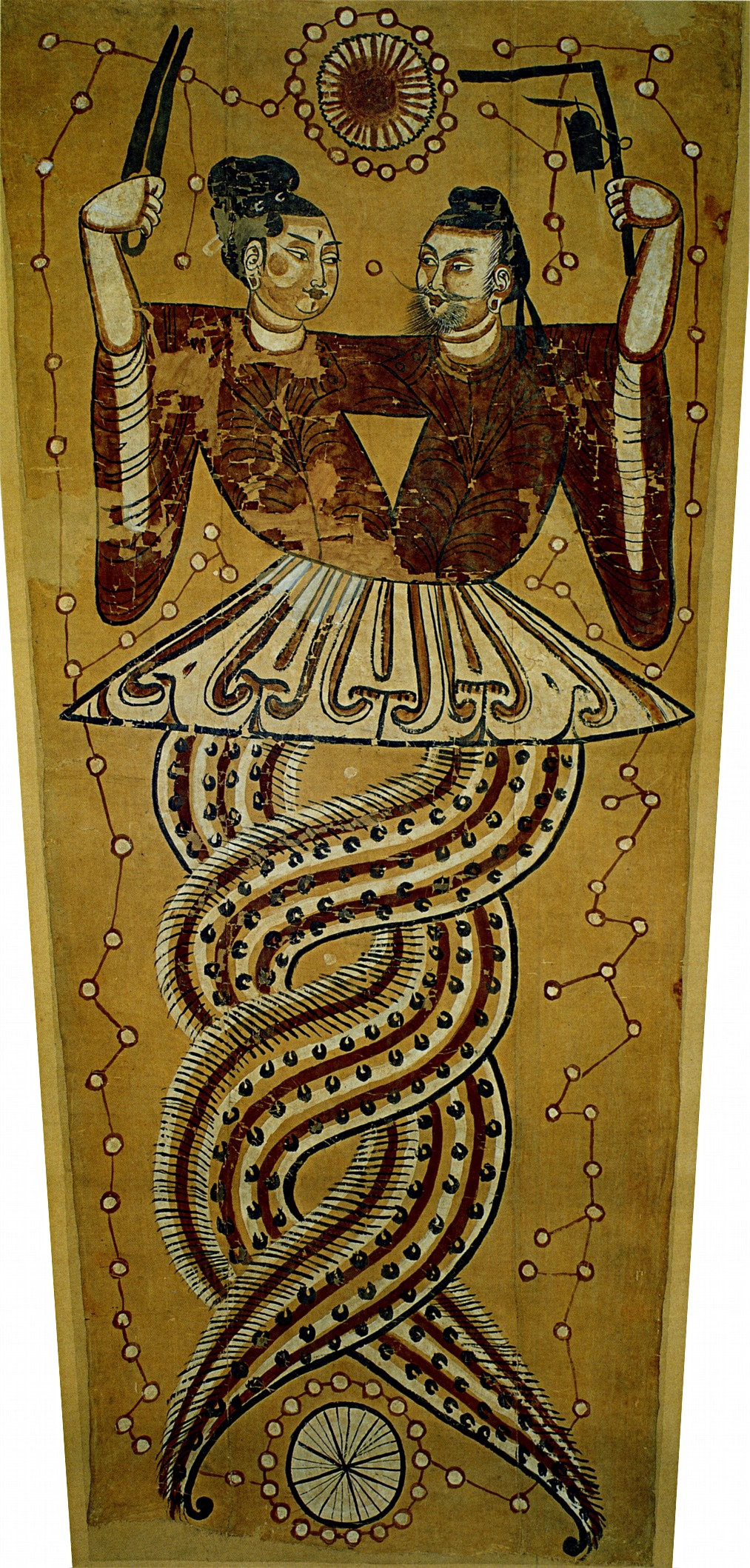
Fuxi and Nuwa, mythical early sovereigns of China

The apex of the nobility is the sovereign. The title of the sovereign has changed over time, together with the connotations of the respective titles. Three levels of sovereignty could be distinguished: supreme rule over the realm, relatively autonomous local sovereignty, and tributary vassalage. The supreme sovereign is the only office translated into English as the term "emperor". An emperor might appoint, confirm, or tolerate sub-sovereigns or tributary rulers styled kings.

As a title of nobility, Ba Wang, hegemon, denoted overlordship of several subordinate kings while refraining from claiming the title of emperor. Sovereigns holding the title of king of an individual state within and without the shifting borders of the Chinese political realm might be fully independent heads of foreign states, such as the King of Korea. In some cases, they could be subordinate to foreign emperors just as territorial or tribal sovereign Mongol khans might be subject to one of several Khagans or Great khans.

Some Chinese emperors styled many or all close male relatives of certain kinds such as wang, a term for king or prince, although the sovereignty of such relatives was limited. Local tribal chiefs could also be termed "king" of a particular territory ranging from vast to tiny, using convenient terms of the form "(locality)" + "king" such as Changshawang, "King of Changsha". Changsha was briefly recognized as a kingdom, but was usually a political subunit. "Barbarian" leaders could also be referred to by names such as Yiwang, "king of the Eastern Yi", while in other cases terms such as tusi (土司, "native chief") might be used for the same office.

Family members of individual sovereigns were also born to titles – or granted them – largely according to family tree proximity. This included blood relatives and affinal relatives. Frequently, the parents of a founding dynast would be posthumously elevated to honorary sovereignty.

Titles translated in English as "prince" and "princess" were generally immediate or recent descendants of sovereigns, with increasing distance at birth from an ancestral sovereign in succeeding generations resulting in degradations of the particular grade of prince or princess, eventually to nullity. Rulers of smaller states were typically styled with lesser titles of aristocracy, which could be upgraded or downgraded with or without royal assent. Sometimes such an alteration in grade reflected real power dynamics; in other cases it was merely an act of public relations.

=== Imperial house ===
==== Emperor ====
Also known as Tianzi, "The Son of Heaven" the Chinese emperor wielded varying degrees of power between different emperors and different dynasties, with some emperors being absolute rulers and others being figureheads with actual power in the hands of court factions, eunuchs, the bureaucracy or noble families.

- In the mythical age, the sovereign was titled either huang (皇; huáng, initially an appellation for deceased ancestors) or di (帝; dì, a deity of the Shang dynasty). These mythical rulers were called the Three Sovereigns and Five Emperors. For the lists of the earliest, mythological rulers, both titles are conventionally translated in English as "Sovereigns", though translation as "Emperor" is also seen, which continues backwards in time the concept of an enduring political unity.
- The sovereigns during the Xia dynasty and Shang dynasty called themselves Di (Chinese: 帝 dì); titles of these rulers are generally translated as "king" and rarely as "emperor".
- The sovereigns during the Zhou dynasty called themselves Wang (王; wáng). before the Qin dynasty innovated the new term huangdi which would become the new standard term for "emperor." The title "Wang" should not be confused with the common surname, which, at least by middle and later Chinese historical usage, has no definite royal implications. Rulers of these dynasties are conventionally translated with the title "king" and sometimes "emperor" in English.
- Emperor or Huangdi (皇帝; huángdì) was the title of the Chinese head of state of China from its invention by the Qin dynasty in 221 BCE until the fall of the Qing dynasty in 1911. The first emperor of Qin combined the two words huang and di to form the new, grander title. Since the Han dynasty, Huangdi began to be abbreviated to huang or di. Many other unrelated appellations saw broad use.

The title of emperor was usually transmitted from father to son. Most often, the first-born son of the primary wife inherited the office, failing which the post was taken up by the first-born son of a concubine or consort of lower rank, but this rule was not universal and disputed succession was the cause of a number of civil wars. The emperor's regime in the political theory of Heaven's mandate allowed for a change in dynasty, and an emperor could be replaced by a rebel leader. The overthrow of an imperial house was sufficient evidence of the loss of the Mandate.

==== Imperial spouses and consorts ====
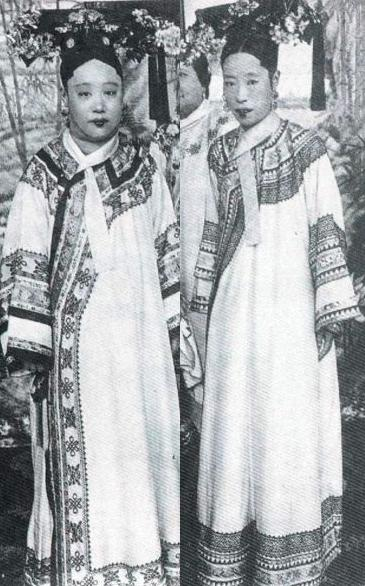
2 pictures:Imperial Consort Jin (left) and Empress Long Yu (right)

It was generally not accepted for a female to succeed to the throne as a sovereign regnant in her own right, rather than playing the role of a sovereign's consort or regent for a sovereign during his age of minority. Official Chinese histories list only one reigning empress, Empress Wu of Tang. However, there have been numerous cases in Chinese history where a woman was the actual power behind the imperial throne.

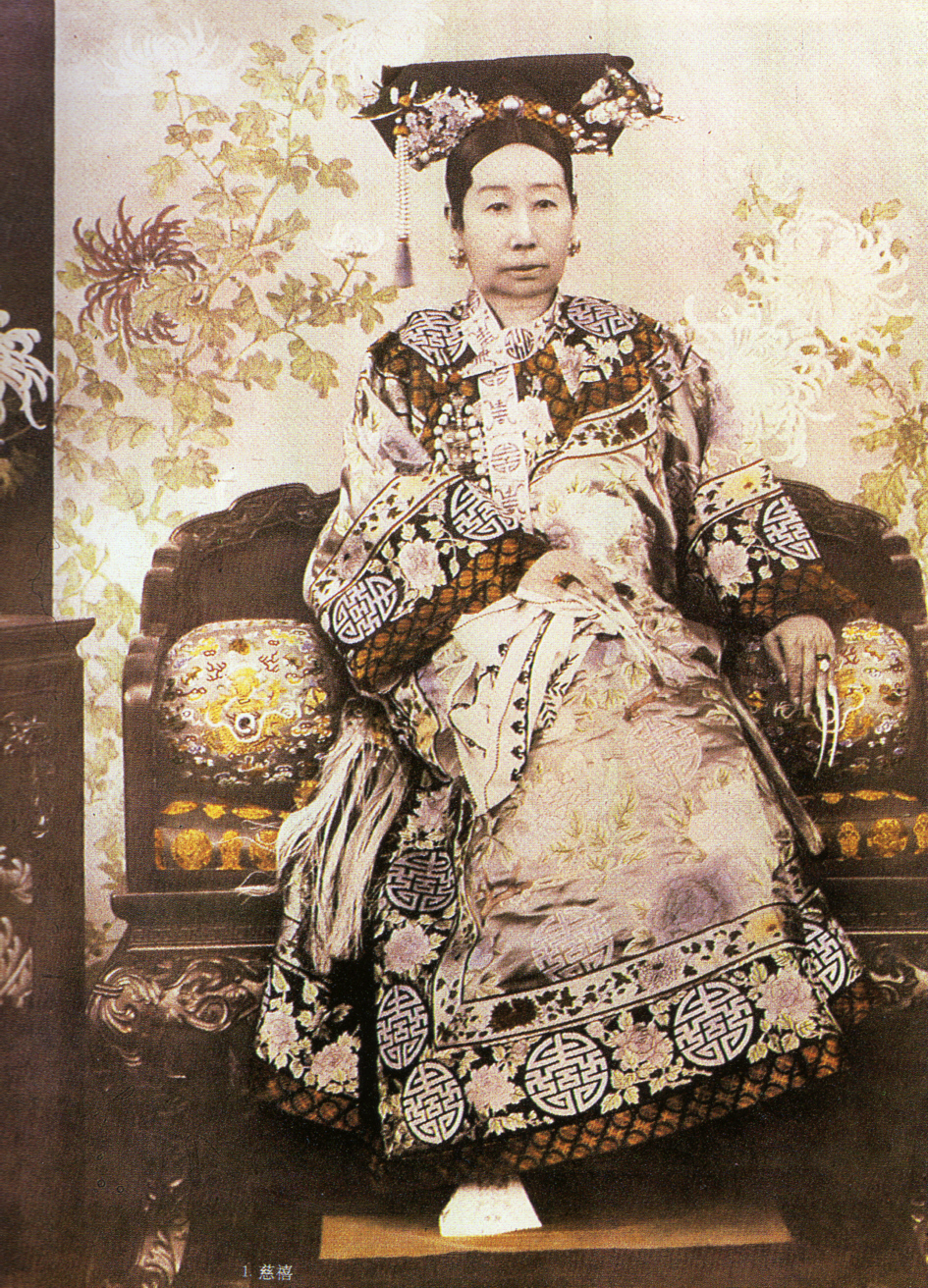
Empress Dowager Cixi, Regent of China considered de facto sovereign of China for 47 years during 1861–1908

Hou (后: Empress, Queen, Empress Consort) was a title granted to an official primary spouse of the polygynous male Chinese Emperor. It was also used for the mother of the Emperor, typically elevated to the rank of Empress Dowager (太后: Tai Hou, "Grand Empress") regardless of which spousal ranking she bore prior to the emperor's accession. In practice, many Chinese Empresses Dowager wielded great power— either as official regent for a young sovereign or with the influence of position within family social ranks. From Empress Lü of Han (r. 195–180 BCE) to Empress Dowager Cixi of Qing (r. 1861–1908), some women unquestionably reigned supreme.

Imperial Consorts, ranking below Empress, aren't often distinguished in English from imperial Concubines, the next lower rank, but these were also titles of significance within the imperial household.

The Rites of Zhou states that Emperors are entitled to the following simultaneous spouses:

- 1 Empress (皇后)
- 3 Madames or Consorts (夫人)
- 9 Imperial Concubines (嬪)
- 27 Shifus (世婦)
- 81 Imperial Wives (御妻)

=== Hegemons ===
Sovereigns styled Ba or Bawang (霸王, hegemon-protector), asserted official overlordship of several subordinate rulers while refraining from claiming the royal title. This practice began in the Spring and Autumn period, spurred by a royal house too militarily weak to defend its own lands, in combination with an aristocracy flexing its power in novel ways. A later example of this title is Xiang Yu (d. 202 BCE), who styled himself Xīchǔ Bàwáng, Hegemon of Chu.

== Two crownings and three respects ==
It was a custom in China for the new dynasty to ennoble and enfeoff a member of the dynasty which they overthrew, so that they could maintain sacrifices to their ancestors. This practice was referred to as "the two crownings and three respects." (Chinese: 二王三恪; pinyin: Èrwáng Sānkè)

=== Ancient China ===
It is said that when the purported Xia dynasty was overthrown by the Shang dynasty, Xia descendants were given a title and fiefs by the Shang King in Qi (杞) and Zeng.

When the Shang dynasty was overthrown by the Zhou dynasty, the Zhou King granted a Shang royal scion the title Gong and fief of Song.

=== Era of disunity ===
In 220 CE, Emperor Xian of Han abdicated his throne to Cao Pi, who granted the previous emperor the title Duke of Shanyang (山陽公). His line persisted until 309.

The Emperors of Shu Han came from a cadet branch of the Han dynasty. When Cao Wei defeated the Shu Han Emperor Liu Shan, he and his family were granted noble titles under the new regime.

When the Eastern Wu was defeated by the Western Jin dynasty, the Jin Emperor granted the Eastern Wu Emperor Sun Hao the title of "Marquis of Guiming". Sun Hao's sons were made junior officials in the Jin government.

A number of outgoing emperors during the kaleidoscopic Six Dynasties period were enfeoffed by their overthrowers and subsequently killed anyway. This specific vicissitude was shared by Emperor Gong of Jin, Emperor Shun of Liu Song, Emperor He of Southern Qi, and Emperor Jing of Liang, representing consecutive dynasties between 421 and 558. The child emperor Gao Heng of the Northern Qi dynasty experienced a similar narrative arc two decades later.

=== Later developments ===
This practice continued all the way through the Xinhai Revolution of 1911, when the Republic of China allowed the last Qing Emperor to stay in the Forbidden City and keep his title, treating him as a foreign monarch until 1924. The descendants of Confucius were maintained in the title of Duke Yansheng until 1935 when the title was changed to Sacrificial Official to Confucius (大成至聖先師奉祀官), which remains as a position to this day, currently held by Kung Tsui-chang.

== Pre-imperial aristocracy ==
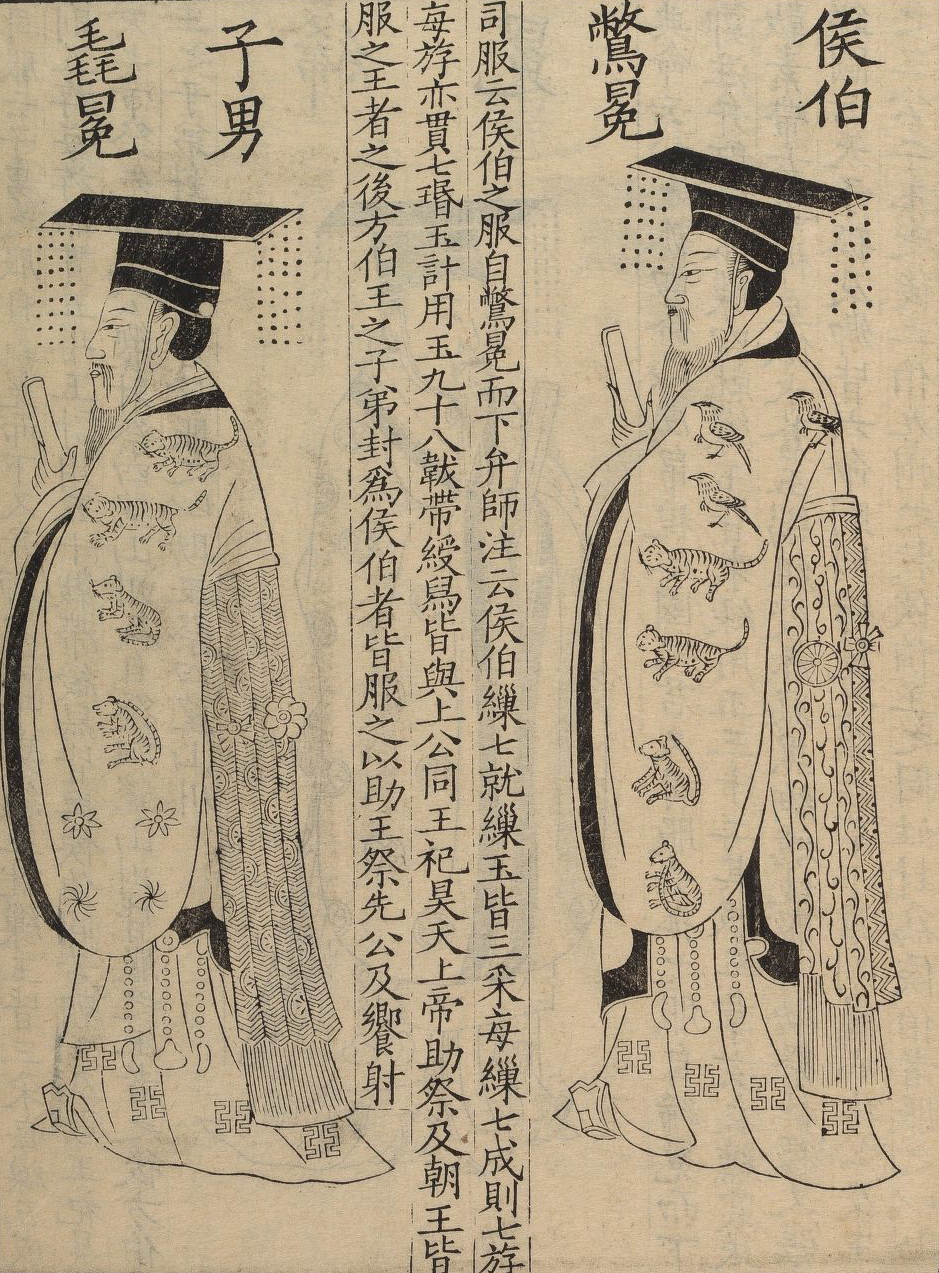
Bimian (鷩冕) and Cuimian (毳冕) ceremonial robes of regional lords (侯伯) and eldest son (of nobility) (子男), according to Zhou dynasty ceremony.

The Zhou dynasty not only preceded the full unification of early China under the Qin dynasty, the first empire whose realm would subsequently be considered to extend broadly enough to be national in the context of the territorial concept of China, the Zhouli, Rites of Zhou were subsequently canonized by Confucius among his Confucian Chinese classics as a model precedent in principles of government, so ranks of nobility in later regimes both in periods of unified sovereignty and of competing smaller states would typically draw from its catalog of peerage. From Zhouli, later Confucian political philosophy and government publications, and from the surrounding historical literature of particular individuals, localities and events, the following social classifications have been attested.

=== Honors and awards, and clan law, of the Zhou dynasty ===
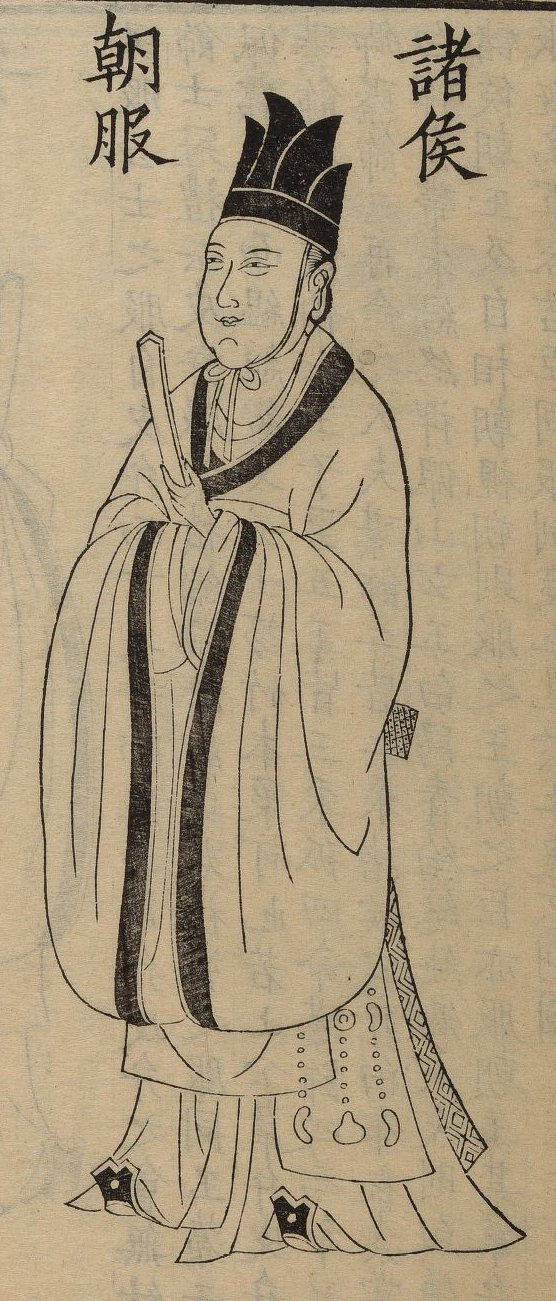
Chaofu (朝服) ceremonial court dress worn by lords.

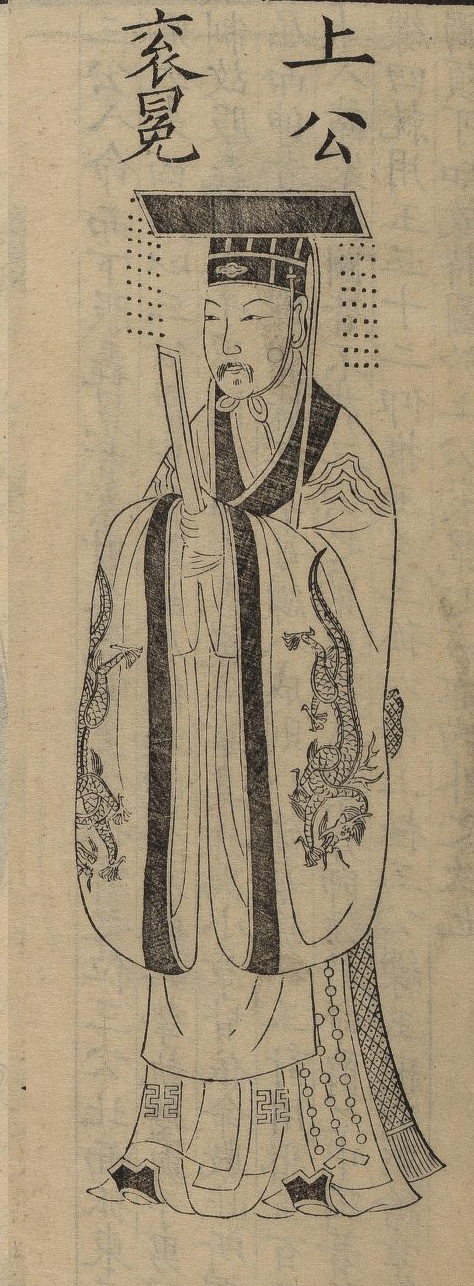
Gunmian for gong (公)

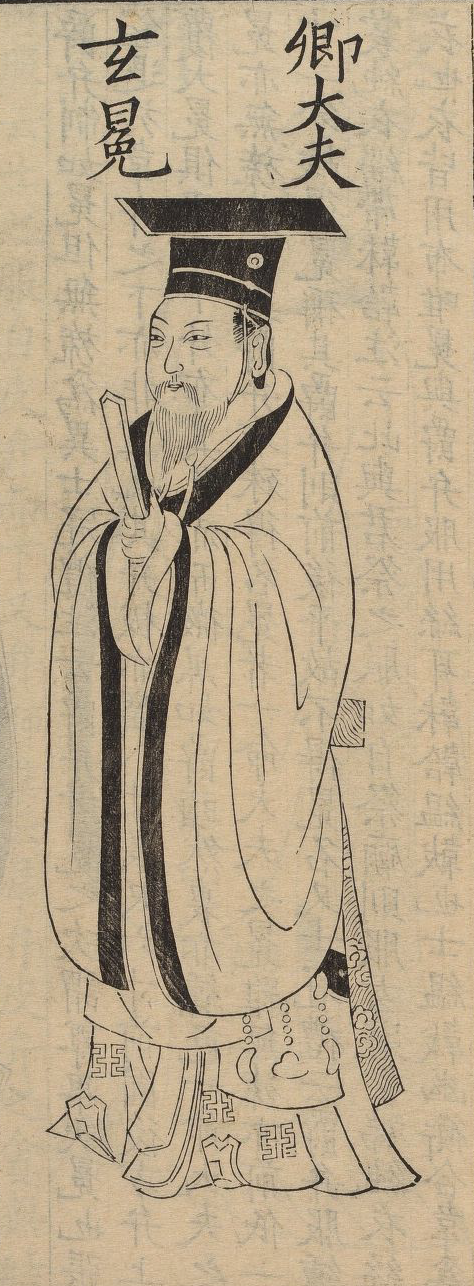
Xuanmian for dafu (大夫)

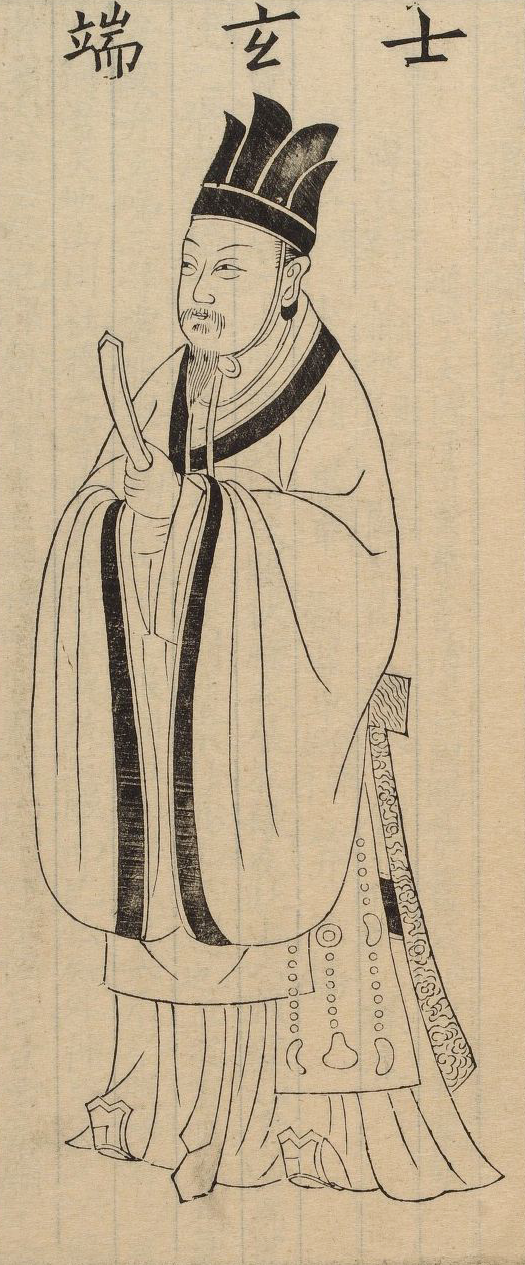
Xuanduan used by shi (士)

The social system of the Zhou dynasty is sometimes referred to as the Chinese feudalism and was the combination of fengjian (enfeoffment and establishment) and zongfa (clan law). Male subjects were classified into, in descending order of rank:

- the landed nobles – Zhuhou (諸侯 pinyin zhū hóu),
- the ministers (of the royal court) – Qing (卿 qīng),
- the bureaucrats/barony – Dafu (大夫 dà fū)
- the gentry – Shi (士 shì)
- the commoners – Shumin (庶民 shù mín).

Zongfa (宗法, clan law), which applied to all social classes, governed the primogeniture of rank and succession of other siblings. The eldest son of the consort would inherit the title and retained the same rank within the system. Other sons from the consort, concubines and mistresses would be given titles one rank lower than their father.

As time went by, all terms had lost their original meanings nonetheless. Qing (卿), Daifu (大夫) and Shi (士) became synonyms of court officials.

=== Peer ranks of the Zhou dynasty ===
==== Western Zhou ====
In the Western Zhou period, ranks were not systematized. There were titles that indicated political authority as well as those concerned with seniority in the ancestral temple. These were not mutually exclusive, and the names of some ranks could also be used as generic terms of respect to varying degrees in different circumstances. The most common titles were as follows:

- Gong (公): Duke, Excellency, Patriarch. A term of highest respect, certain rulers (typically senior in the ancestral temple to the royal house), a term of address for any ruler within their own state, any ancestor within their own ancestral shrine, the highest government ministers.
- Hou (侯): Lord, Regional lord. Solely political term for certain rulers of specific ancient Chinese states.
- Bo (伯): Elder, Chief. A birth order term of seniority within the aristocracy indicating the most senior male member of a sublineage along the primary (patrilineal) line of descent.
- Zi (子): master, unratified lord, ruler, sir. A term with many meanings, most not listed here, zi could be used as a term of respect for anybody, could indicate the son of an extremely high-ranking aristocrat or minister, or could be used as a title for any ruler who did not accept the authority of the Zhou royal house over them.
- Nan (男). Rarely seen title applied to the rulers of two particular states.

==== Eastern Zhou ====
As central authority crumbled, the aristocracy found itself needing to signal who had more land, power, and resources. During this time the titles they had been using started to take on a more systematized structure. After a few hundred years, political thinkers saw this emergent structure and projected it idealistically and anachronistically backwards into a past where it had not actually held. This was called Wǔděngjuéwèi (五等爵位), five (aristocratic) peerage ranks (abbreviated Wǔjué) below the royal ranks. This idealized structure was later implemented as policy during the early imperial period. Much later English translators attempted to map European-style feudal titles onto these. These titles were also used much later in Meiji-period Japan to name the ranks of the Kazoku.

==== Male aristocracy ====
- Gong (公; gōng: "duke", "lord"), held by some of the oldest lineages, still a term of highest respect in the Eastern Zhou, but with a more political character than the old sense of aristocratic honour.
- Hou (侯; hóu: "marquess", "marquis", "margrave"), usually with the same emphasis on being a national borderland march lord as indicated by the element mar- present in its roughly analogous translations. These lineages, granted some of the largest and most promising peerages at the beginning of the Western Zhou, tended to possess the most political resources, despite being technically second rank.
- Bo (伯; bó: "earl", "count"). This birth order term (meaning "eldest") came to carry a fully independent political meaning.
- Zi (子; zǐ: "viscount", "master", "unratified lord"). Still a term pregnant with multiple meanings, by the late Eastern Zhou this title had found a place in the new graded hierarchy.
- Nan (男; nán: "burgrave", "baron"). Title held by precisely two lineages.

==== Female aristocracy ====
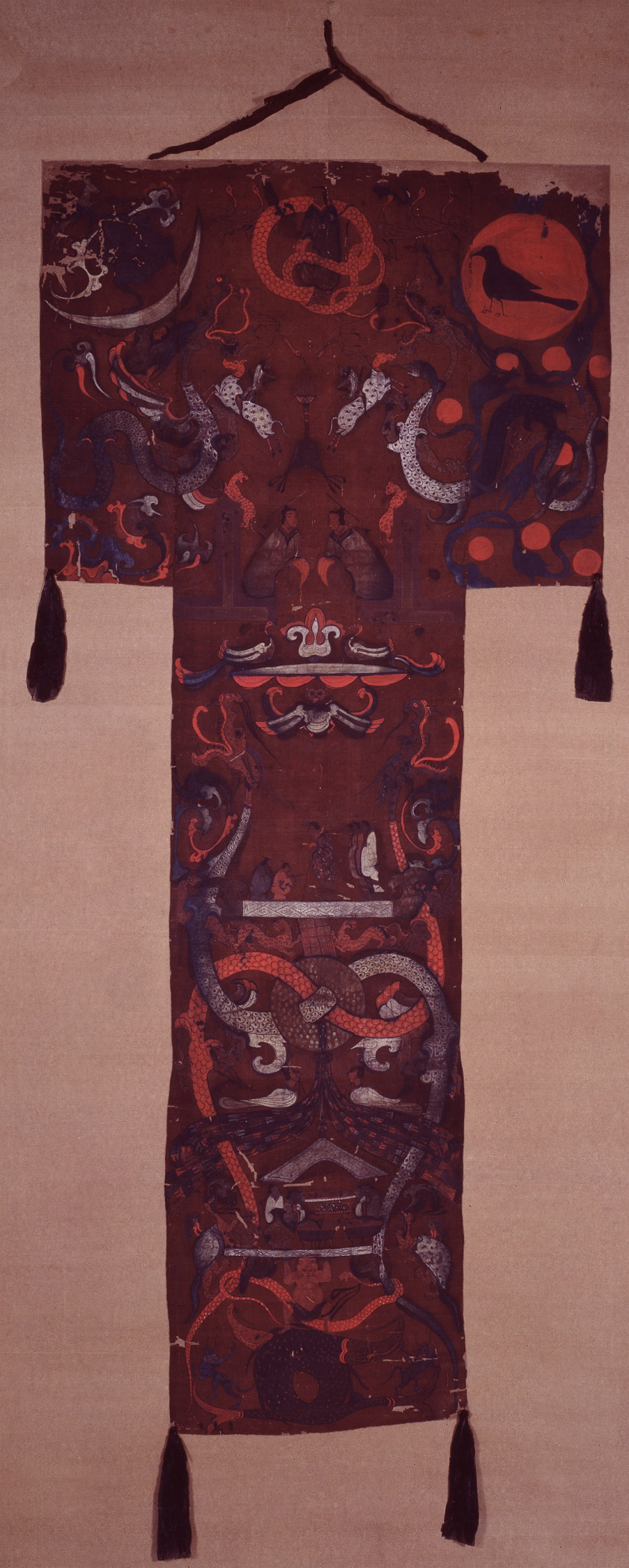
Funeral Drape of Lady Dai, personal name (married surname Li though in Chinese custom she may have used a maiden surname even after marriage) Xinzhui (辛追), Marchioness of Dai, wife of the first Marquis of Dai, personal name Li Cang (利蒼) who was appointed chancellor of Changsha Kingdom by the Han dynasty, Mawangdui

Titles of female members of the aristocracies varied in different dynasties and eras, each having unique classifications for the spouses of the emperor. Any female member excluding a spouse of an emperor can be called a princess or gōngzhǔ (公主), and incorporated her associated place into her title if she had one.

==== Other titles and honorifics ====
Besides the systematized ranks listed above, there were also other familial appellations used as titles, e.g. Bo (伯; such as Bo Qin of Lu, later, its usage changed to titles for hegemony and countship), Zhong (仲; such as Guo Zhong, younger brother of King Wen of Zhou), Shu (叔; such as several younger brothers of King Wu of Zhou, Guanshu Xian, Wei Kangshu, etc.), and Ji (季; such as Ranji Zai), birth order terms meaning "eldest," "second eldest," "third eldest," and "youngest" (Shu was later used by extension to denote a father's younger brother); and Jiu (舅, maternal uncle).

Sons of kings who did not receive other titles were generically called Wangzi (王子, king's son), and their children Wangsun (王孫, royal scion). Similarly, sons and grandsons of dukes and lords were called Gongzi (公子, duke's son) and Gongsun (公孫, noble descendant).

These honorifics occasionally became heritable titles, no longer indicating relation with the reigning king. Some clans even took them as lineage names. Gongzi eventually evolved into the generic honorific for all young gentry. Today it is either used as a flattering way to address an interlocutor's son, or a pejorative term for a wealthy man. Wangzi, on the other hand, is used today as the generic translation for the sons of a foreign monarch.

=== Chu nobility ===
The southern state of Chu had a notably distinct culture from the central plain states, including the nobility system. The royal ancestral temple kinship group surnamed Xiong and its branch lineages of Qu, Jing, and Zhao formed the main nobility of Chu. Within the elite, Chu's early period mirrored that of Predynastic Zhou, the aristocratic ancestral temples and clan lineages sufficing to determine social position, without an additional expressly political dimension. Chu's formal system of rank appeared around the late Spring and Autumn period, similar to the remainder of the Zhou confederation, but with different titles such as Tonghou (通侯, marquis-peer), Zhigui (執珪, jade scepter bearer), Zhibo (執帛, silk bearer). Their political offices also differed in name even where scope of responsibilities did not. Noble ranks, bestowed primarily as reward for military and civil service, and not in principle heritable, came with a state stipend. Holders of the highest ranks also received fiefs and the honorific title Jun (君, lord), such as Lord Chunshen.

The full systematization of ranks pioneered by the Qin dynasty took a bit longer to overcome Chu's distinct culture, such that the Han founder Liu Bang, being of Chu origin, also awarded distinctly Chu titles.

== Other historical Chinese titles ==
Other titles might be tailored down to a single individual being officially honored for a particular achievement, with or without executive portfolio following the granting of the title, and might truly be titles outside the executive government structure, even when words used in their phrasing would otherwise imply executive office, e.g.,

Protector General (都護; Duhu) – for example, Ban Chao.

On the other hand, victorious generals were often granted official praise-names or names implying particular old and new duties or some combination of these, which would be quasi-executive or fully executive titles honored as much like peerage as like actual military rank, as in the case of Liu Bei promoting Guan Yu to a rank phrased as General Who Exterminates Bandits (蕩寇將軍) during the active course of Guan Yu's military career.

In Dutch East Indies (modern-day Indonesia), the Dutch authorities appointed Chinese officers to the colonial administration to oversee the governance of the colony's Chinese subjects. These officials bore the ranks of Majoor, Kapitein or Luitenant der Chinezen, and had extensive political and legal jurisdiction over the local Chinese community. Their descendants bore the hereditary title of Sia, and constituted the Cabang Atas or the Chinese gentry of colonial Indonesia.

== See also ==
- Imperial, royal and noble ranks
