= Qiang tie =

Russian currency used in China (1858–1920)

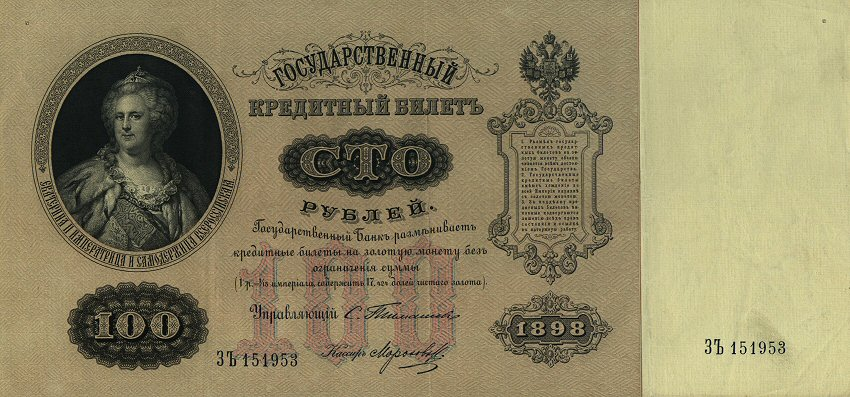
1898 ruble banknote

Qiang tie (Chinese: 羌帖; pinyin: qiāng tiē) is a Chinese folk name for banknotes of the Russian ruble issued by the Russian Empire and later by the White Army. The main regions of ruble transactions in China were concentrated along the Chinese Eastern Railway and Harbin in Manchuria and Ili and Tacheng in Xinjiang. Russian currency in China began circulating in the 1860s and were withdrawn due to severe depreciation in the mid-1920s. There were many qiang tie sources, including the State Bank of the Russian Empire, the Russian Provisional Government, Omsk bonds issued by the Provisional All-Russian Government, the Russo-Chinese Bank, and the administration of the Eastern Railway.

== Name ==
The term qiang tie is popular among many northwestern eastern Chinese residents; though never used officially, the term qiang tie and qiangyang (羌洋) frequently show up in various Chinese documents. Similar to qiang tie, Chinese residents called official Qing-sanctioned banknotes as guantie (官帖, lit. 'official notes'), and non-official banknotes as si'tie (私帖, lit. 'private notes').

One theory for the etymological origin of the term qiang tie is that it is a derivative from the word laoqiang (老羌), a popular local name for Russians during the early Qing Dynasty. According to Fang Gonggan's book Jie Yu Ji Lue, the alternate spelling of laoqiang, 老枪, is derived from the Chinese word for shotgun as Russians were considered noticeably proficient with the weapon.

== History ==
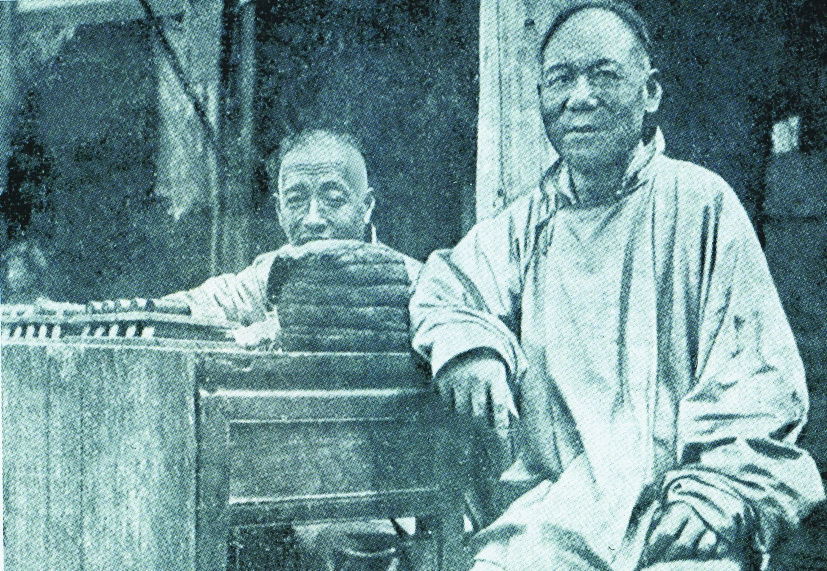
Street money exchangers in Harbin, early 20th century

Russian rubles began to travel across the Russo-Chinese border following the Treaty of Aigun in 1858, signed between Nikolay Muravyov-Amursky (governor-general of Siberia) and Yishan (general of Heilongjiang). By 1875, the Russian ruble had acquired a significant position in the economy of Manchuria.

Flow of rubles continued with the establishment of a branch of the Russo-Chinese Bank in Harbin, as well as the construction of the Chinese Eastern Railway. As Russians gained influence in Harbin, the amount of rubles invested increased to approximately 315 million by July 1, 1903, primarily used by the Russo-Chinese Bank to purchase building materials and goods. Given the predominance of rubles in freight charges and tax payments, qiang tie became the dominant currency in Harbin, forming its own separate currency circulation model in Northeastern China. All Chinese merchants who came to Harbin had to convert their currency into qiang tie banknotes.

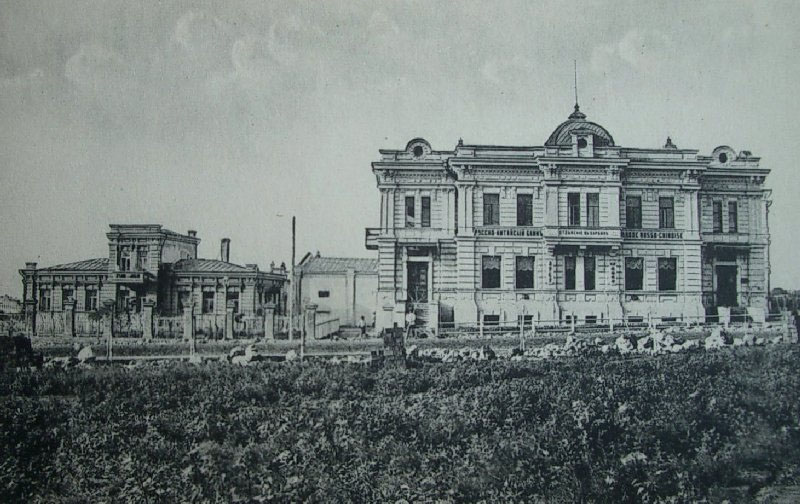
The Harbin branch of the Russo-Chinese Bank (right), 1900s

In 1897, the Russians adopted the gold standard. In Harbin, the Russo-Chinese Bank advertised that the "ruble is gold", and that merchants may exchange banknotes to silver and gold rubles. An influx of qiang tie banknotes occurred during the Russo-Japanese War, where the Imperial Russian army purchased large amounts of supplies from locals. However, the rubles' hard-won position among other foreign currencies would be constantly threatened by external events, such as the Russian defeat at the Battle of Tsushima in 1905 and consequent loss in the war.

In July 1914 (the eve of the First World War), the Russian government ended the redeemability of qiang tie, making them non-cashable. Devaluation and the turbulent war situation made qiang tie speculation a lucrative business, with many Chinese (like Yuan Shikai's son, Yuan Keqi) believing the price would go up once Russia won the war. From 1892 to 1916, the net inflow of Russian banknotes was as high as 415 million rubles. Especially in Manchuria, these rubles were quickly swept off the market by money exchangers in nearby Harbin locales to be exchanged. In 1917, the last shipment of gold rubles, 10 million from Petrograd, were called "romanovs", as Imperial Russia thus ceased to exist due to the February Revolution.

Banknotes now issued by Alexander Kerensky of the Russian Provisional Government were officially recognized by the Beiyang Government, with circulation of rubles reaching as many as 400 million in North Manchuria. In November 1917, the Provisional Government was overthrown by the Bolsheviks, yet Harbin and the Chinese Eastern Railway remained under the influence of Russian Whites. In November 1918, Admiral Alexander Kolchak of the Provisional All-Russian Government introduced a new line of banknotes, called "Omsk Bonds", and declared the Kerensky banknotes no longer redeemable.

Shortly after the collapse of the Omsk government before the rise of the Vladivostok government, the Beiyang government began cracking down on foreign influences in Manchuria, abolishing the CER concession zone. Additionally, due to rampant inflation, the value of any qiang tie banknote dropped to one thousand to one Chinese yuan. As local vendors refused to accept qiang tie and railroad workers went on strike when they were paid in it, the Central Eastern Railway, now under Chinese control, fully shut down qiang tie as legal tender. The Beiyang government finally killed it off in the mid-1920s by withdrawing all qiang tie from market circulation.

== Qiang tie types ==
=== Romanov "Old" Note ===
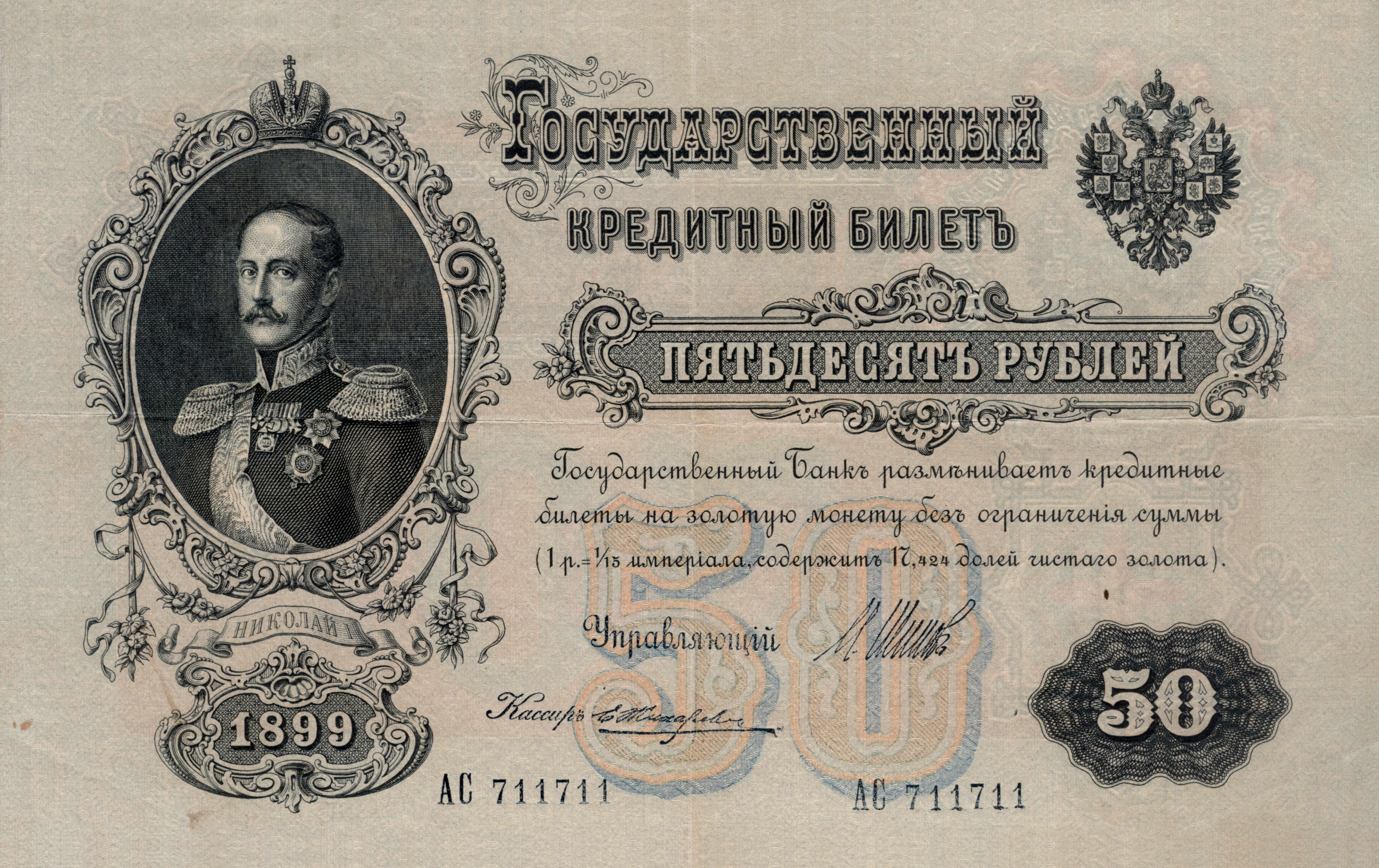
1899 50-ruble banknote

The Romanov qiang tie, issued by the State Bank of the Russian Empire, is the oldest and best-established. The "Old" notes are relative to the "New" notes that went into circulation following the February Revolution in 1917. The main denominations are 1, 3, 5, 10, 25, 50 rubles. In 1897, the Russian gold standard and regulations on the Romanov banknotes saw massive circulation of these notes into Northeast China.

=== Kerensky "New" Note ===
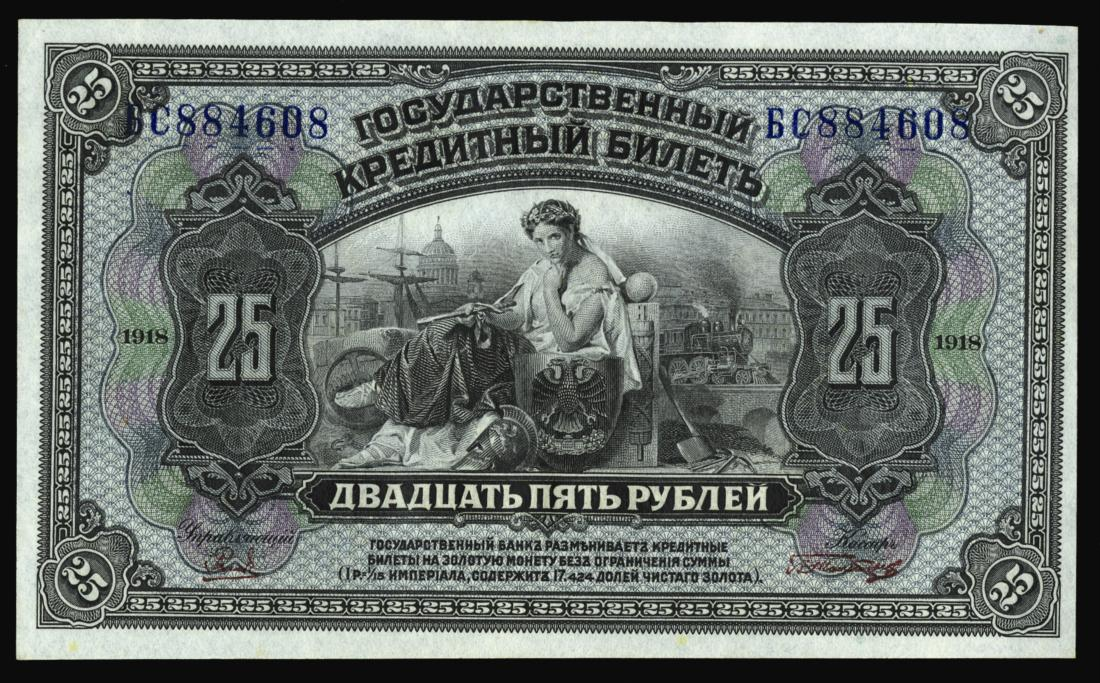
1918 25-ruble banknote

Kerensky qiang tie came into circulation in Northeast China after the overthrow of Nicholas II and the Russian Provisional Government in Petrograd was established. Though it claimed to still be a gold standard currency, it could not be exchanged. Kerensky notes came into China in 1917 after Kudanev, the Russian Provisional Government's ambassador to the Beiyang government, posted notices for the new currency in Chinese newspapers. The Beiyang government complied, and demanded that Kerensky's banknotes "must be exercised without any doubts". Once Omsk bonds entered the circulation in 1919, however, Kerensky's banknotes became invalid overnight. At that time, Kerensky's notes in Harbin alone amounted to more than 300 million rubles, more than 120 million rubles in Jilin, and more than 480 million rubles in the hands of overseas Chinese in Vladivostok.

=== Omsk Bond ===
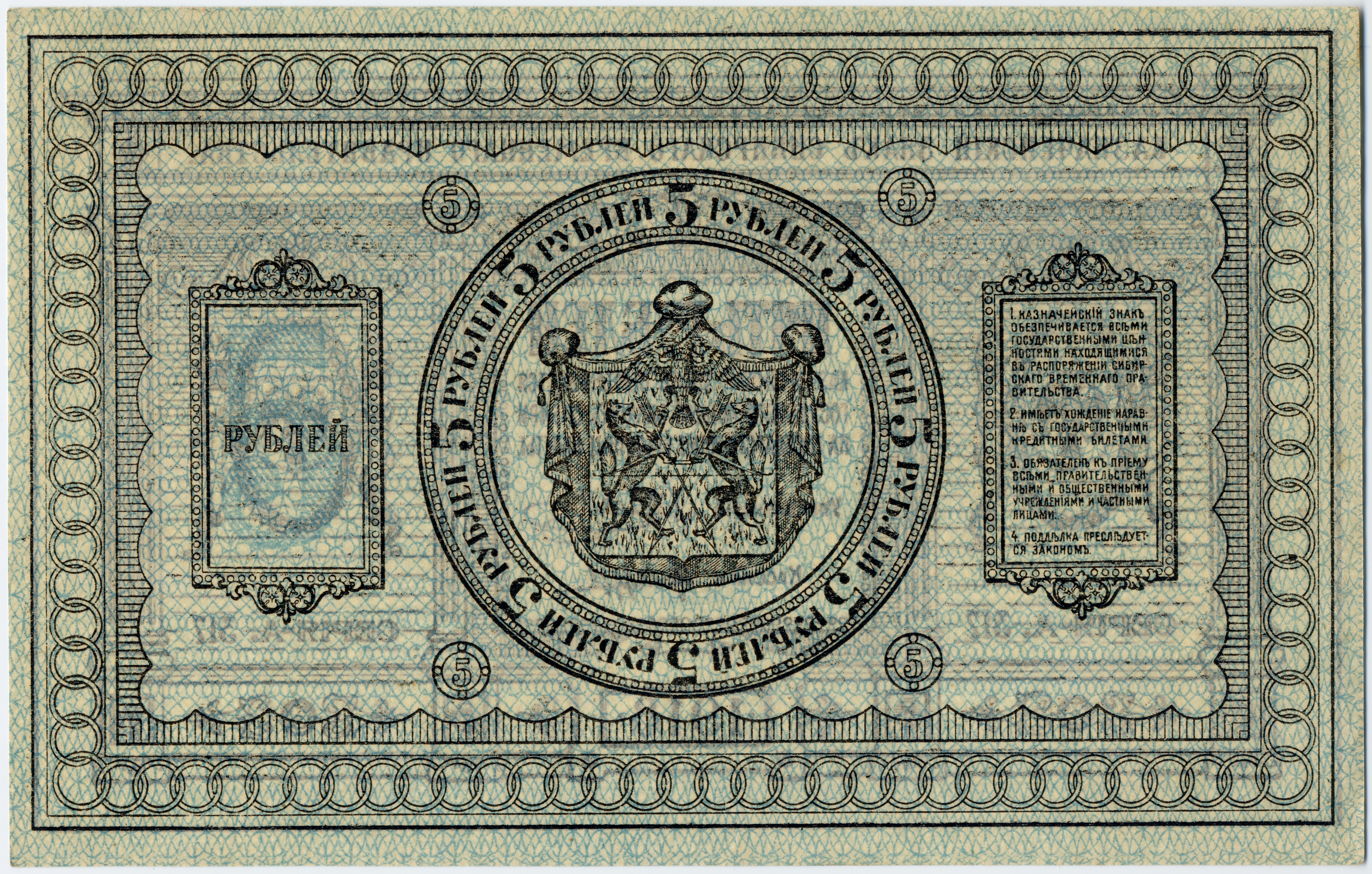
1918 10-ruble banknote

Omsk bonds, short-term treasury bonds issued by Kolchak's All-Russian Government in 1918, were initially small-denomination bonds of 1, 5, and 10 rubles. Such notes were called "temporary Siberian notes". In 1919 and 1920, Omsk bonds of larger denominations with 25, 50, 250, 500, 1000, 5000, 10000, and 25000 were called "Siberian treasury bills". Chinese locals called the large denomination bills "Yellow Stripes" (黄条子) in Manchuria and "Cow's Tongues" (牛舌头) in Xinjiang. The Omsk Bond had significantly less buying power, being only used in train tickets on the Chinese Eastern Railway. The Omsk government collapsed on October 16, 1919. From December 1, 1920, the Central Railway Bureau no longer accepted Omsk bonds.

=== Harbin Ruble ===
The Harbin Ruble, also known as the Russo-Chinese Bank banknote or Khorvat Ruble, printed by the American Banknote Corporation (now known as ABCorp) with a total circulation of 20 million rubles. The issuing of this banknote was largely resisted by the general Chinese public, as well as Chinese governors Meng Enyuan (of Heilongjiang) and Zhang Zuolin (of Fengtian). Its usage was primarily limited to the Chinese Eastern Railway and the Daoli district of Harbin. It went out of circulation on March 13, 1920.
