= Kopek (disambiguation) =

Kopek, also spelled kopeck or copeck in English, is a (typically one-one hundredth) subdivision of several currencies.

Kopek or Köpek may also refer to:

== Currencies ==
- Russian ruble (kopeyka, plural kopeyki)
- Belarusian ruble (kapeyka, plural kapeyki)
- Ukrainian hryvnia (kopiyka, plural kopiyki)
- Transnistrian ruble (kopiyka, plural kopiyki)

== Other uses ==
- Köpek, the Turkish-language word for dog
- Kopek (band), an Irish rock band
- Sa'd al-Din Köpek (died 1240), court administrator under Seljuq Sultans of Rum

== See also ==
- Copic, a brand of refillable markers and related products
- Cent (disambiguation)
- Kopec (disambiguation)
- Ruble (disambiguation)
