= Staré Křečany =

- Municipality
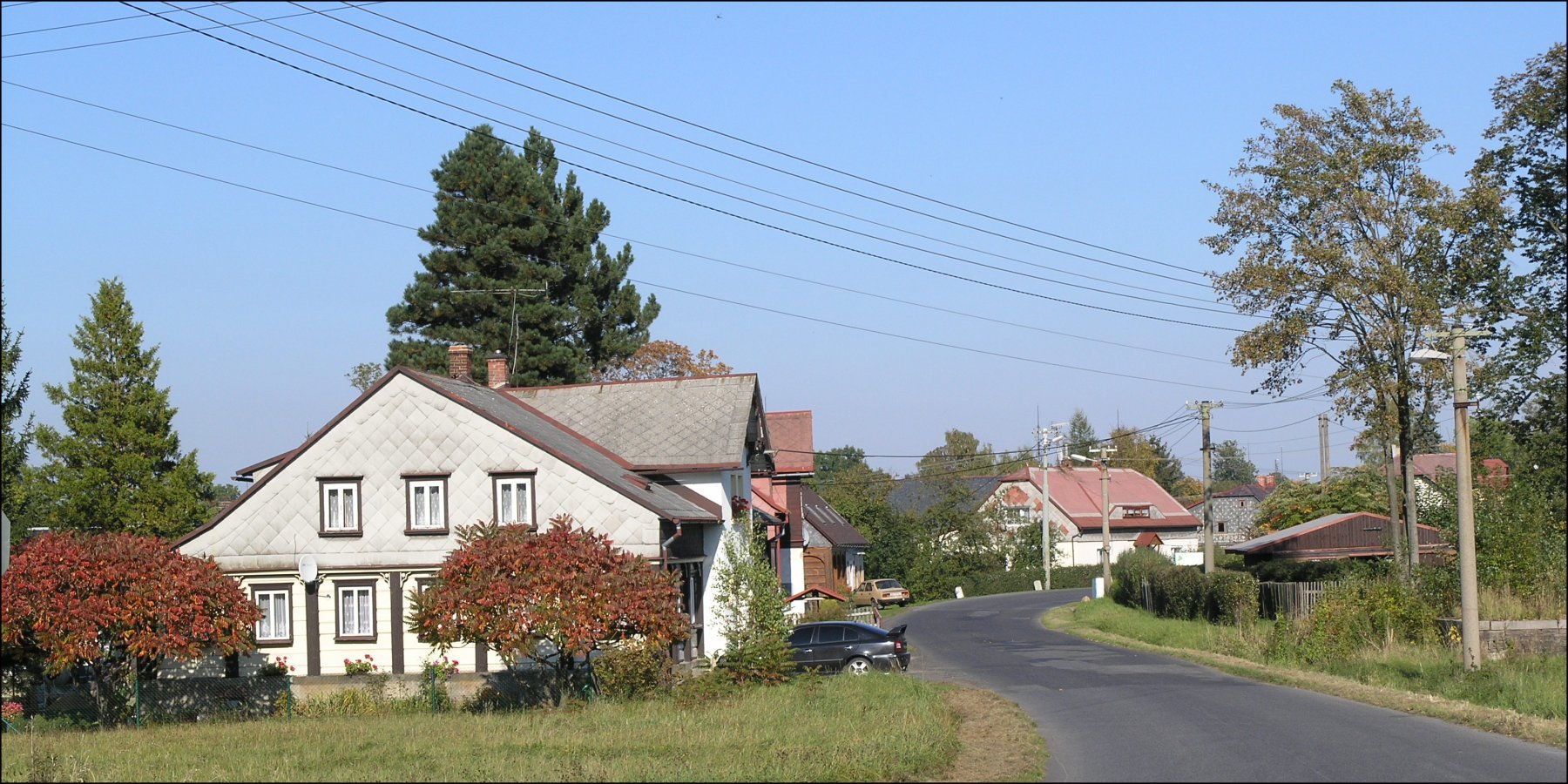
- Main road in Staré Křečany

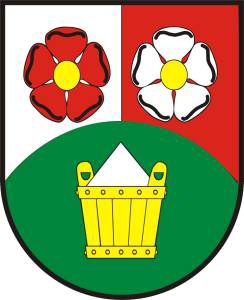
- Flag Coat of arms

- Location in the Czech Republic
- Coordinates: 50°57′2″N 14°29′47″E
- Country: Czech Republic
- Region: Ústí nad Labem
- District: Děčín
- First mentioned: 1485

Area
  - Total: 36.77 km^{2} (14.20 sq mi)
- Elevation: 399 m (1,309 ft)

Population (2026-01-01)
  - Total: 1,218
  - Density: 33.12/km^{2} (85.79/sq mi)
- Time zone: UTC+1 (CET)
  - Summer (DST): UTC+2 (CEST)
- Postal code: 407 61
- Website: www.krecany.cz

Staré Křečany (until 1946 Starý Ehrenberk; German: Alt Ehrenberg) is a municipality and village in Děčín District in the Ústí nad Labem Region of the Czech Republic. It has about 1,200 inhabitants.

== Administrative division ==
Staré Křečany consists of six municipal parts (in brackets population according to the 2021 census):

- Staré Křečany (691)
- Brtníky (191)
- Kopec (18)
- Nové Křečany (202)
- Panský (17)
- Valdek (22)

== Geography ==
Staré Křečany is located about 27 kilometres (17 mi) northeast of Děčín and 45 km (28 mi) northeast of Ústí nad Labem. It lies in the salient region of Šluknov Hook, briefly bordering Germany in the west.

Staré Křečany lies mostly in the Lusatian Highlands, only the southwestern part of the municipal territory extends into the Elbe Sandstone Mountains. The highest point is at 566 m (1,857 ft) above sea level. The Mandau River originates in the municipal territory and then flows through the village of Staré Křečany.

== History ==
The first written mention of Staré Křečany is from 1485 (under the name Starý Ehrenberk). The village was founded by a salt trade route leading from the Baltic to the south. In 1633, Starý Ehrenberk was destroyed by Saxons and Swedes. The village was not restored until 1686.

Until World War II, the village was ethnically mixed Czech-German. After the war, the German-speaking population was expelled. In 1946, the municipality and the village were renamed Staré Křečany.

== Demographics ==
Historical population

Year	Pop.	±%
1869	7,529	—
1880	7,399	−1.7%
1890	7,050	−4.7%
1900	6,571	−6.8%
1910	6,718	+2.2%

Year	Pop.	±%
1921	5,826	−13.3%
1930	6,021	+3.3%
1950	2,014	−66.6%
1961	2,000	−0.7%
1970	1,785	−10.8%

Year	Pop.	±%
1980	1,438	−19.4%
1991	1,147	−20.2%
2001	1,175	+2.4%
2011	1,204	+2.5%
2021	1,141	−5.2%

Source: Censuses

== Transport ==
Staré Křečany is located on the railway line Rumburk–Mikulášovice. However, trains run on it only on weekends and holidays during the summer season.

== Sights ==
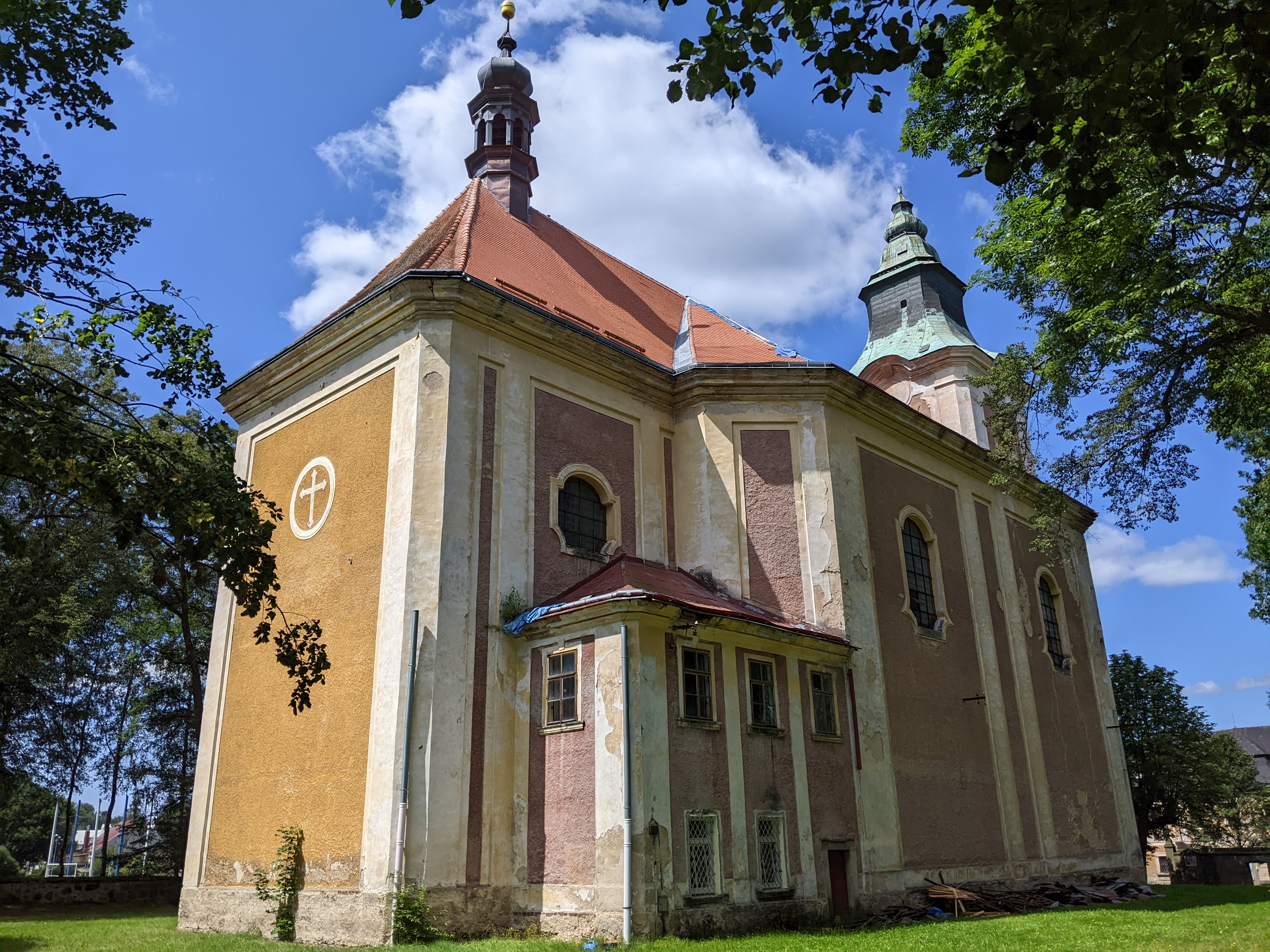
Church of Saint John of Nepomuk

The main landmark of Staré Křečany is the Church of Saint John of Nepomuk. It was built in the late Baroque style in 1736–1741. In 1795, a large entrance gate with statues of angels and the cemetery wall were added. The Stations of the Cross were established by the cemetery wall in 1822.
