= Qi Yaolin =

Qi Yaolin (Chinese: 齊耀琳) (1863 – ?) was a Chinese politician of the late Qing Dynasty and early period of the Republic of China. He was born in Jilin. He was the last Qing governor of Henan from December 1911 to February 1912. In March 1912, the new Republican government appointed him military governor of Henan. He supported Yuan Shikai's restoration of the monarchy in December 1915.

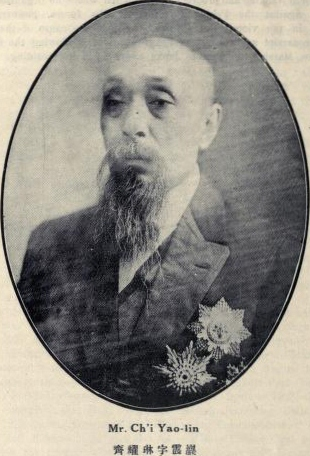
齊耀琳

== Awards and decorations ==
Order of the Precious Brilliant Golden Grain
Order of the Golden Grain
Order of Wen-Hu
