= Zhang Huaizhi =

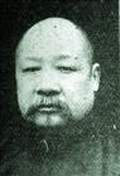
- Native name: 張懷芝
- Born: 1862
- Died: 1934 (aged 71–72)

Zhang Huaizhi (traditional Chinese: 張懷芝; simplified Chinese: 张怀芝; pinyin: Zhāng Huáizhī; Wade–Giles: Chang Huai-chih) (1862 – 1934) was a brigade-general during the Boxer Rebellion; a warlord in the early Chinese Republic; Viceroy of Shandong. He was eliminated in the Second Zhili–Fengtian War.
