= Kopec (Staré Křečany) =

Village in the Ústí nad Labem Region, Czech Republix

- Village
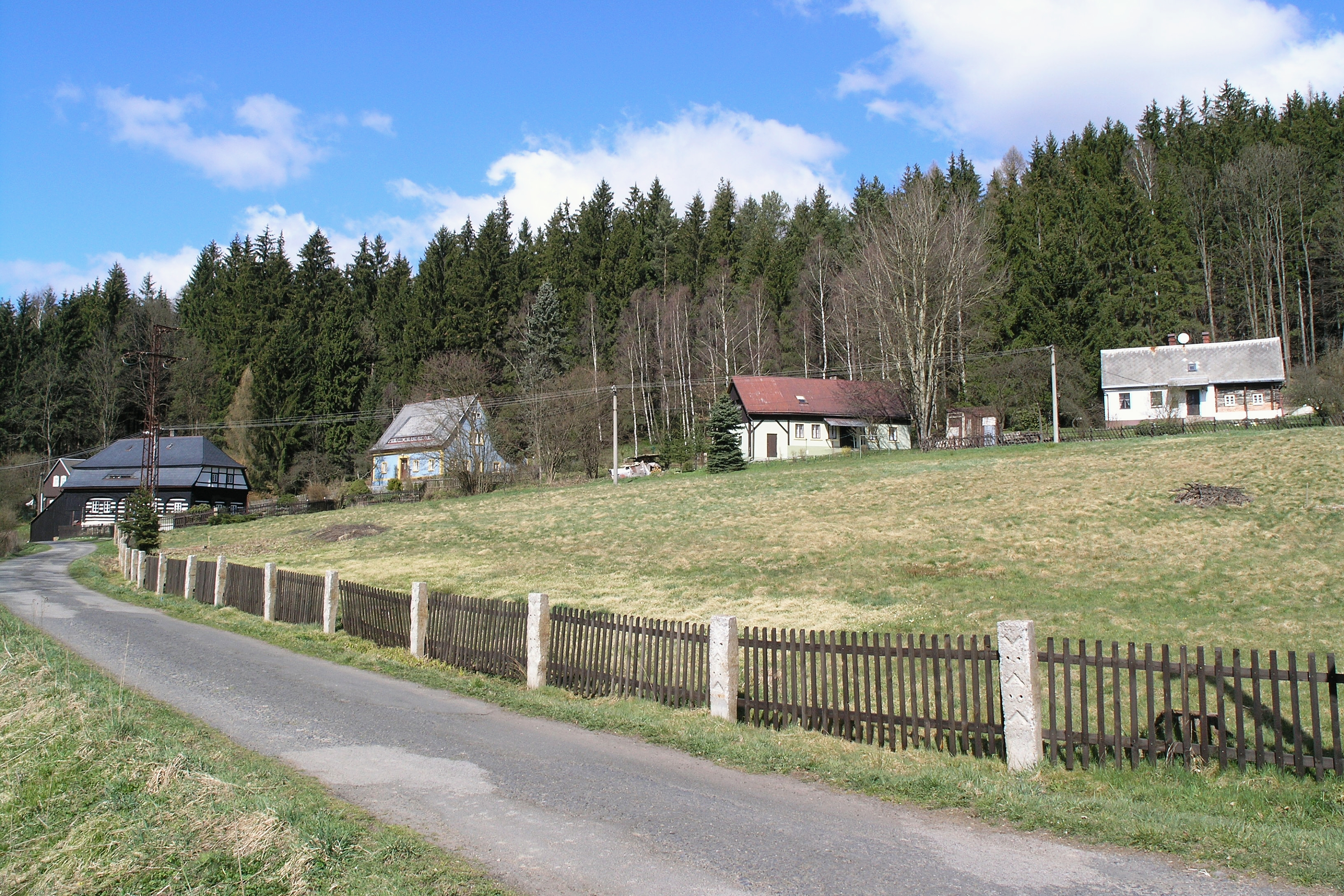
- View of Kopec

- Location in the Czech Republic
- Coordinates: 50°56′45″N 14°25′23″E
- Country: Czech Republic
- Region: Ústí Region
- District: Děčín
- Municipality: Staré Křečany
- First mentioned: 1720

Area
  - Total: 3.47 km^{2} (1.34 sq mi)

Population (2021)
  - Total: 18
- Time zone: UTC+1 (CET)
  - Summer (DST): UTC+2 (CEST)
- Postal code: 407 60

Kopec (Czech pronunciation: [ˈkopɛts]; German: Hemmehübel) is a village and administrative part of Staré Křečany in Děčín District in the Ústí nad Labem Region of the Czech Republic. According to the 2021 Czech census, it has 18 inhabitants and 23 buildings.

Before World War II, it was a mostly German-speaking, thriving village with hundreds of inhabitants, several mills, multiple ponds, restaurants, guesthouses and a shop. Now, Kopec is mostly a destination for tourists, as it is very close to the Bohemian Switzerland National Park and the Saxon Switzerland National Park.

== Etymology ==
The Czech name Kopec means 'hill'. It is derived from the original German name "Hemmehübel", which combines the words hemmen ('to break') and Hübel (a regional term for a hill). The name Hemmehübel was used until 1947. Since then, only the Czech name Kopec has been officially used.

== Demographics ==
Until World War II, the entire village and region were almost entirely German-speaking. In the 19th century, the population reached over 400 people, but it gradually declined. After World War II, the German-speaking population was expelled. As a result, the village was almost abandoned, the mills stopped operating, ponds ceased to exist, and nearly half of the buildings were lost due to abandonment and lack of maintenance. Now, compared to the pre-war era, the population is low.

Historical population

Year	Pop.	±%
1869	411	—
1880	397	−3.4%
1890	381	−4.0%
1900	324	−15.0%
1910	291	−10.2%

Year	Pop.	±%
1921	245	−15.8%
1930	270	+10.2%
1950	27	−90.0%
1961	25	−7.4%
1970	18	−28.0%

Year	Pop.	±%
1980	64	+255.6%
1991	3	−95.3%
2001	7	+133.3%
2011	12	+71.4%
2021	18	+50.0%

Source: Censuses

== Points of interest ==
- The Chapel of the Virgin Mary (built 1809)
- Restaurant "U Oty" (before war known as Gasthaus "Focke")
- A column with a statue of Saint Anthony of Padua (built 1707)
- Kaufer's Cross (built 1804)
