= Meng Enyuan =

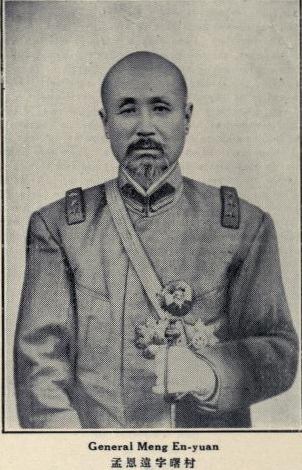
- Born: 1856; Tianjin, Zhili Province, (Qing dynasty) Qing Empire
- Died: 1933 (aged 76–77)
- Military career
- Allegiance: Qing Dynasty; Beiyang government
- Branch: New Army
- Awards: Order of Rank and Merit; Order of the Precious Brilliant Golden Grain; Order of Wen-Hu

Meng Enyuan (Chinese: 孟恩遠) (1856–1933) was a Chinese general of the late Qing and early Republican period in China. A native of Tianjin, in what was then the province of Zhili, Meng was commander of the Chinese army garrison in Jilin province before being forced out by Wu Junsheng and Zhang Zuolin. He later allied with Wu Peifu and the Zhili clique against Zhang's Fengtian clique in the First Zhili-Fengtian War.
